= A. amseli =

A. amseli may refer to:

- Aethes amseli, a tortrix moth
- Alisa amseli, a small moth
- Autophila amseli, an owlet moth
