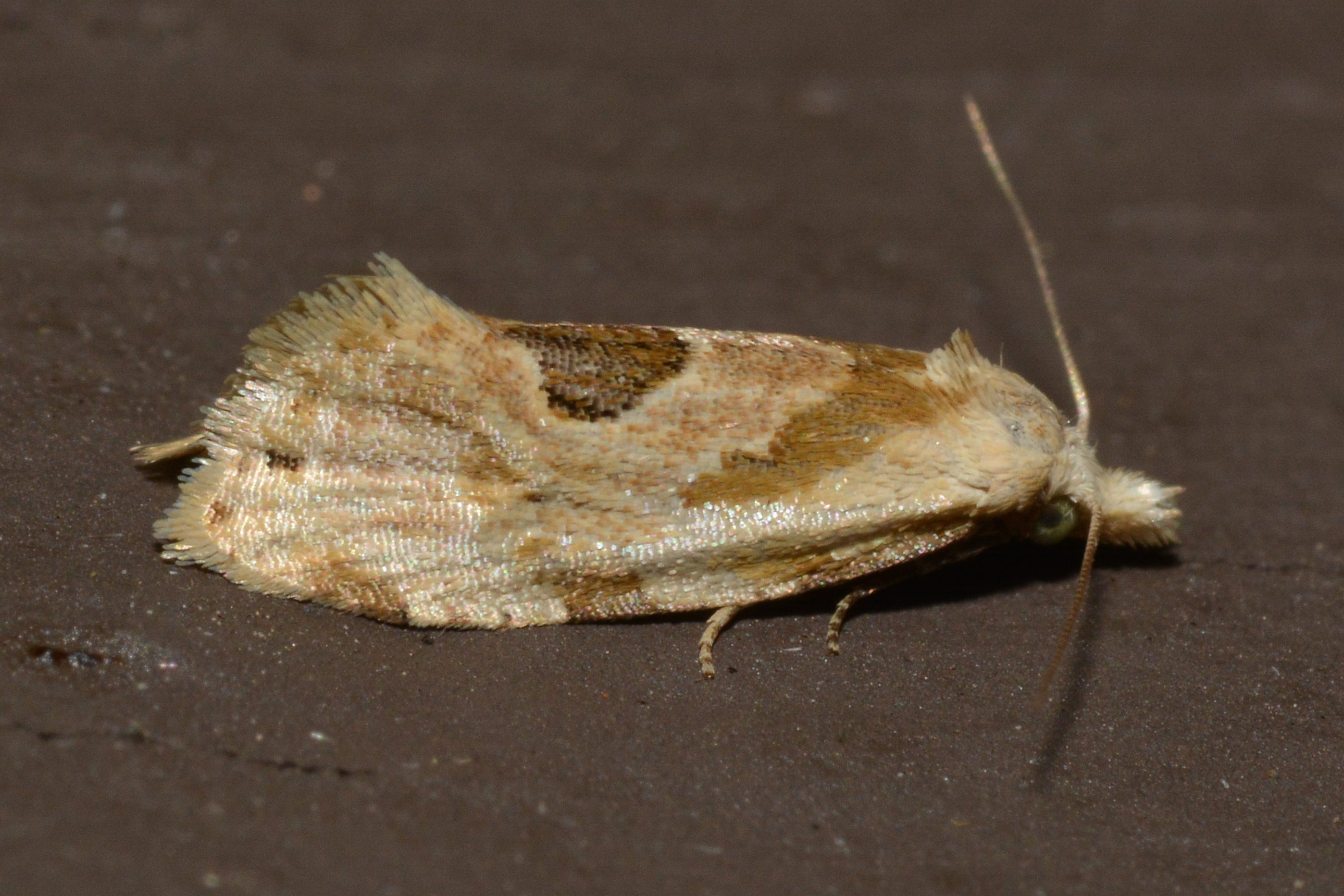

Scientific classification
- Domain: Eukaryota
- Kingdom: Animalia
- Phylum: Arthropoda
- Class: Insecta
- Order: Lepidoptera
- Family: Tortricidae
- Genus: Aethes
- Species: A. promptana

Binomial name
- Aethes promptana (Robinson, 1869)

Synonyms
- Conchylis promptana Robinson, 1869

= Aethes promptana =

Species of moth

Aethes promptana is a species of moth of the family Tortricidae. It is found in North America, where it has been recorded from Nova Scotia, Illinois, Maine, Mississippi, Missouri, New Jersey, Ohio, Pennsylvania and Wisconsin.

The length of the forewings is 5.7–7.9 millimetres (0.22–0.31 in).
