= Aethes confinis =

Scientific classification
- Domain: Eukaryota
- Kingdom: Animalia
- Phylum: Arthropoda
- Class: Insecta
- Order: Lepidoptera
- Family: Tortricidae
- Genus: Aethes
- Species: A. confinis

Binomial name
- Aethes confinis Razowski, 1974

Species of moth

Aethes confinis is a species of moth of the family Tortricidae. It was described by Razowski in 1974. It is found in Bulgaria, Ukraine and the eastern Palearctic ecozone.

The wingspan is 8–9 millimetres (0.31–0.35 in). Adults are on wing in July.
