= Aethes atmospila =

Scientific classification
- Kingdom: Animalia
- Phylum: Arthropoda
- Class: Insecta
- Order: Lepidoptera
- Family: Tortricidae
- Genus: Aethes
- Species: A. atmospila

Binomial name
- Aethes atmospila (Meyrick in Caradja & Meyrick, 1937)

Synonyms
- Phalonia atmospila Meyrick in Caradja & Meyrick, 1937

Species of moth

Aethes atmospila is a species of moth of the family Tortricidae. It is found in China (Xinjiang, Yunnan).
