= Aethes kasyi =

Scientific classification
- Domain: Eukaryota
- Kingdom: Animalia
- Phylum: Arthropoda
- Class: Insecta
- Order: Lepidoptera
- Family: Tortricidae
- Genus: Aethes
- Species: A. kasyi

Binomial name
- Aethes kasyi Razowski, 1962

Species of moth

Aethes kasyi is a species of moth of the family Tortricidae. It was described by Razowski in 1962. It is found on Sicily and Cyprus and in Italy, Bulgaria, North Macedonia, Ukraine and Iran.

The wingspan is 17–18 millimetres (0.67–0.71 in). Adults are on wing in March and from May to June and in September.
