= Aethes capnospila =

Scientific classification
- Domain: Eukaryota
- Kingdom: Animalia
- Phylum: Arthropoda
- Class: Insecta
- Order: Lepidoptera
- Family: Tortricidae
- Genus: Aethes
- Species: A. capnospila

Binomial name
- Aethes capnospila (Amsel, 1959)

Synonyms
- Phalonia capnospila Amsel, 1959

Species of moth

Aethes capnospila is a species of moth of the family Tortricidae. It is found in Asia Minor.
