= Aethes bistigmatus =

Scientific classification
- Domain: Eukaryota
- Kingdom: Animalia
- Phylum: Arthropoda
- Class: Insecta
- Order: Lepidoptera
- Family: Tortricidae
- Genus: Aethes
- Species: A. bistigmatus

Binomial name
- Aethes bistigmatus Byun & Li, 2006

Species of moth

Aethes bistigmatus is a species of moth of the family Tortricidae. It is found in China (Jilin) and Korea.
