= Aethes matthewcruzi =

Scientific classification
- Domain: Eukaryota
- Kingdom: Animalia
- Phylum: Arthropoda
- Class: Insecta
- Order: Lepidoptera
- Family: Tortricidae
- Genus: Aethes
- Species: A. matthewcruzi

Binomial name
- Aethes matthewcruzi Sabourin & Miller, in Sabourin, Miller, Metzler & Vargo, 2002

Species of moth

Aethes matthewcruzi is a species of moth of the family Tortricidae. It is found in the United States, where it has been recorded from Maine, Michigan, Minnesota, New Hampshire and Wisconsin.

The length of the forewings is 6.8–8.2 millimetres (0.27–0.32 in) for males and 8.6–9.2 millimetres (0.34–0.36 in) for females.

== Etymology ==
The species is named in honor of Matthew Edward Cruz.
