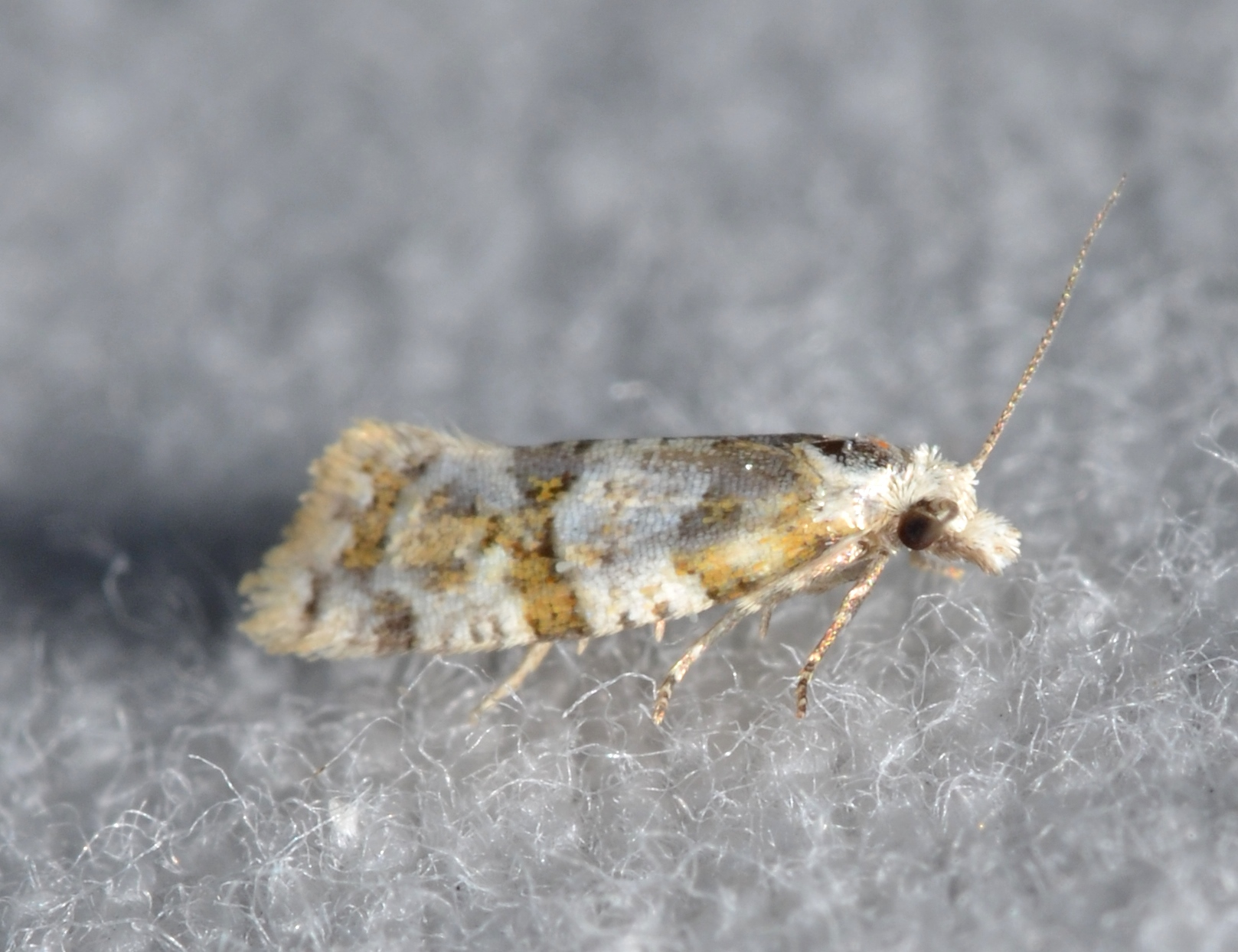

Scientific classification
- Domain: Eukaryota
- Kingdom: Animalia
- Phylum: Arthropoda
- Class: Insecta
- Order: Lepidoptera
- Family: Tortricidae
- Genus: Aethes
- Species: A. argentilimitana

Binomial name
- Aethes argentilimitana (Robinson, 1869)

Synonyms
- Conchylis argentilimitana Robinson, 1869; Conchylis labeculana Robinson, 1869

= Aethes argentilimitana =

Species of moth

Aethes argentilimitana, the silver-bordered aethes, is a species of moth of the family Tortricidae. It is found in North America, where it has been recorded from Ontario, Illinois, Indiana, Kentucky, Maine, Massachusetts, Michigan, Minnesota, Mississippi, New Jersey, Ohio, Pennsylvania, Vermont and Wisconsin. The habitat consists of dry, open areas of meadows and fields.

The length of the forewings is 3.9–5.7 mm. Adults are on wing from April to September, probably in multiple generations per year.
