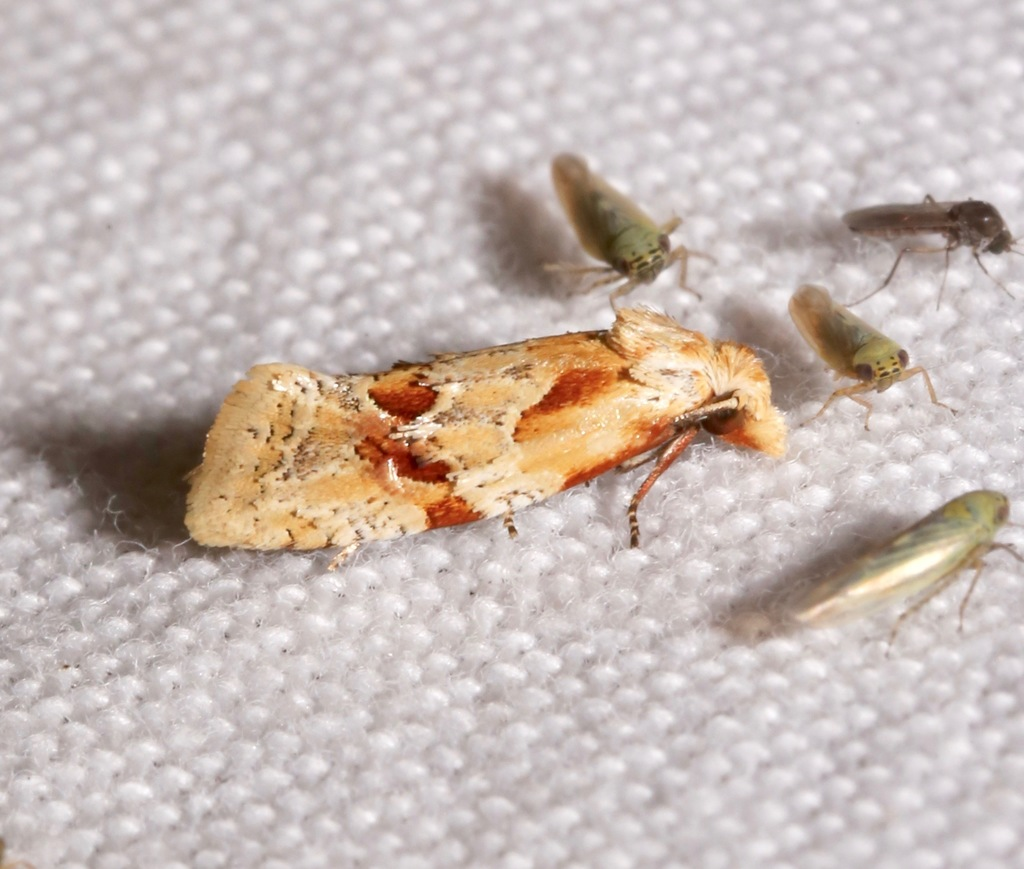

Scientific classification
- Kingdom: Animalia
- Phylum: Arthropoda
- Class: Insecta
- Order: Lepidoptera
- Family: Tortricidae
- Genus: Aethes
- Species: A. bomonana

Binomial name
- Aethes bomonana (Kearfott, 1907)

Synonyms
- Phalonia bomonana Kearfott, 1907; Phalonia cyamitis Meyrick, 1912; Aethes cyanitis Razowski, 2000

= Aethes bomonana =

Species of moth

Aethes bomonana is a species of moth of the family Tortricidae. It is found in the United States, where it has been recorded from Florida, Indiana, Louisiana and Ohio.

The wingspan is 16–22 millimetres (0.63–0.87 in). The forewings are dirty white with ocherous-red and reddish-brown spots. The hindwings are dark purplish grey. Adults have been recorded on wing between February and September.
