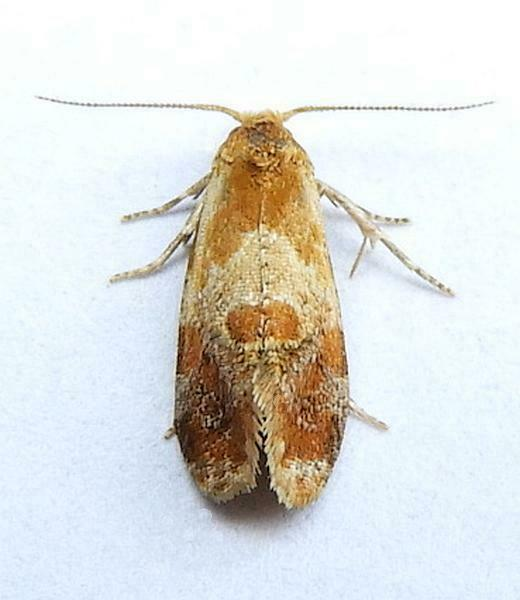

Scientific classification
- Kingdom: Animalia
- Phylum: Arthropoda
- Class: Insecta
- Order: Lepidoptera
- Family: Tortricidae
- Genus: Aethes
- Species: A. interruptofasciata

Binomial name
- Aethes interruptofasciata (Robinson, 1869)

Synonyms
- Conchylis interruptofasciata Robinson, 1869; Phalonia aureana Busck, 1907; Phalonia sublepidana Kearfott, 1907

= Aethes interruptofasciata =

Species of moth

Aethes interruptofasciata is a species of moth of the family Tortricidae. It is found in North America, where it has been recorded from Manitoba, Nova Scotia, Illinois, Maine, Michigan, Missouri, New Jersey, Pennsylvania, West Virginia and Wisconsin. The habitat consists of deciduous forest openings and blueberry thickets.

The length of the forewings is 4.7–7 millimetres (0.19–0.28 in). Adults have been recorded on wing from May to August, probably in multiple generations per year.
