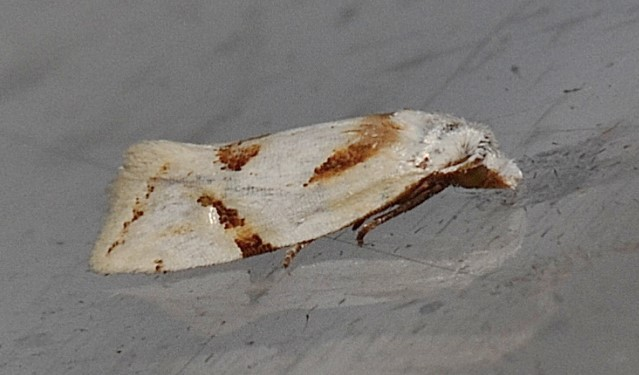

Scientific classification
- Domain: Eukaryota
- Kingdom: Animalia
- Phylum: Arthropoda
- Class: Insecta
- Order: Lepidoptera
- Family: Tortricidae
- Genus: Aethes
- Species: A. seriatana

Binomial name
- Aethes seriatana (Zeller, 1875)

Synonyms
- Conchylis seriatana Zeller, 1875; Phtheochroa seriatana

= Aethes seriatana =

Seriated aethes moth

Species of moth

Aethes seriatana, the seriated aethes moth, is a species of moth of the family Tortricidae. It was described by Zeller in 1875. It is found in North America, where it has been recorded in the south-eastern United States from Texas to Florida, and north to Maryland. It is also found on Cuba and Bermuda.

The wingspan is 11–12 millimetres (0.43–0.47 in). Adults have been recorded on wing all months of the year, but flight times depend on the location.
