= Aethes lygrana =

Scientific classification
- Kingdom: Animalia
- Phylum: Arthropoda
- Class: Insecta
- Order: Lepidoptera
- Family: Tortricidae
- Genus: Aethes
- Species: A. lygrana

Binomial name
- Aethes lygrana Karisch, 1992

Species of moth

Aethes lygrana is a species of moth of the family Tortricidae. It is found in Israel. It is known for its light yellow wings with chestnut markings.
