= Aethes lateritia =

Scientific classification
- Domain: Eukaryota
- Kingdom: Animalia
- Phylum: Arthropoda
- Class: Insecta
- Order: Lepidoptera
- Family: Tortricidae
- Genus: Aethes
- Species: A. lateritia

Binomial name
- Aethes lateritia Razowski, 1970

Species of moth

Aethes lateritia is a species of moth of the family Tortricidae. It was described by Razowski in 1970. It is found in Iran and Pakistan.
