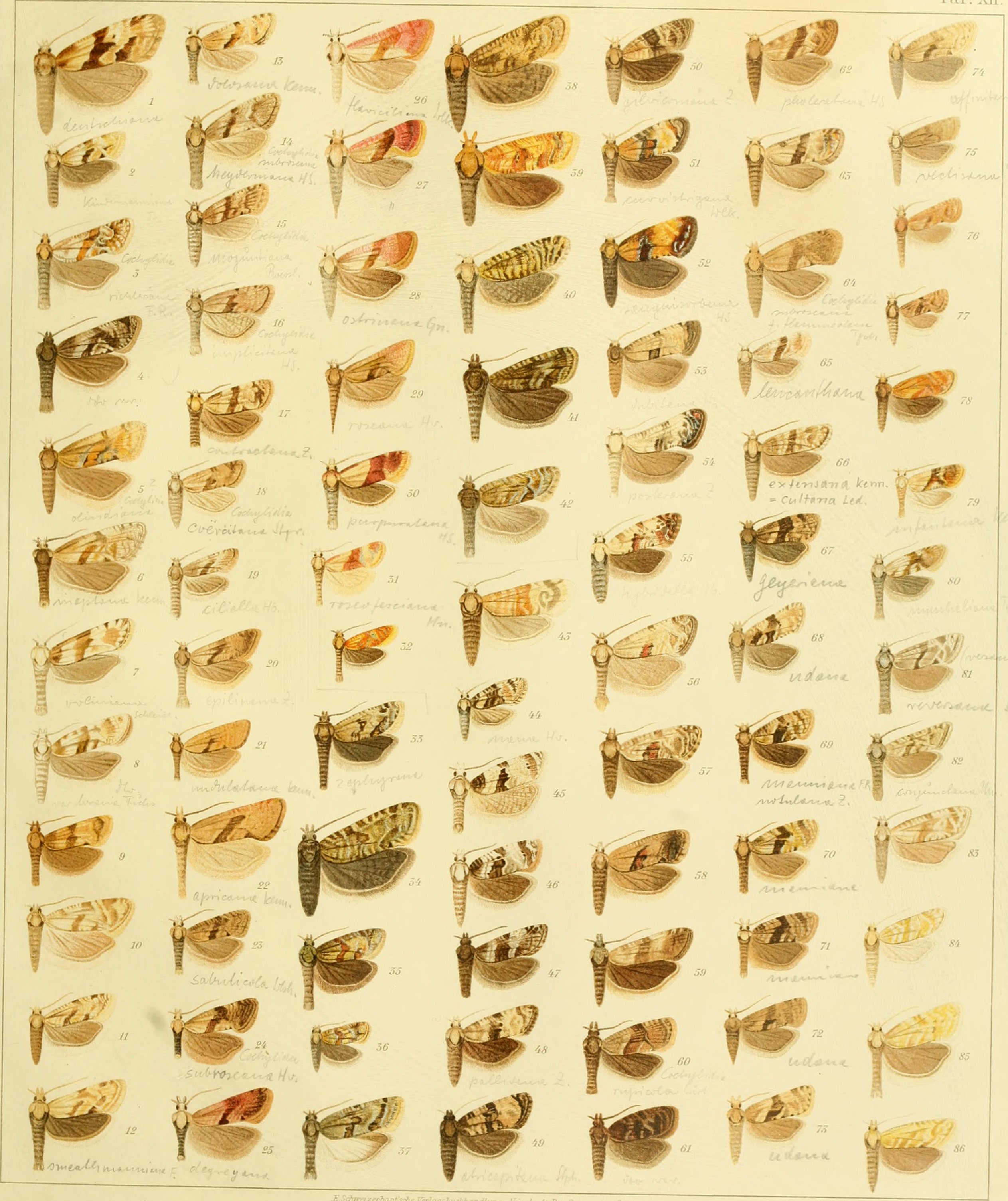
- in Kennel Die palaearktischen tortriciden figure 45, male, 46 female

Scientific classification
- Domain: Eukaryota
- Kingdom: Animalia
- Phylum: Arthropoda
- Class: Insecta
- Order: Lepidoptera
- Family: Tortricidae
- Genus: Aethes
- Species: A. mesomelana

Binomial name
- Aethes mesomelana (Walker, 1863)

Synonyms
- Sciaphila mesomelana Walker, 1863; Conchylis cunabulana Caradja, 1916; Conchylis suppositana Kennel, 1901

= Aethes mesomelana =

Species of moth

Aethes mesomelana is a species of moth of the family Tortricidae. It was described by Francis Walker in 1863. It is found in China (Heilongjiang, Hubei, Liaoning, Shanghai) and Russia (Amur).
