= Aethes xanthina =

Scientific classification
- Domain: Eukaryota
- Kingdom: Animalia
- Phylum: Arthropoda
- Class: Insecta
- Order: Lepidoptera
- Family: Tortricidae
- Genus: Aethes
- Species: A. xanthina

Binomial name
- Aethes xanthina Falkovitsh, 1963

Species of moth

Aethes xanthina is a species of moth of the family Tortricidae. It is found from European Russia to the Near East, Turkmenistan, Kazakhstan, Tajikistan, Uzbekistan, Kyrgyzstan and Iran.

The wingspan is 13–16 millimetres (0.51–0.63 in). Adults are on wing from May to July.
