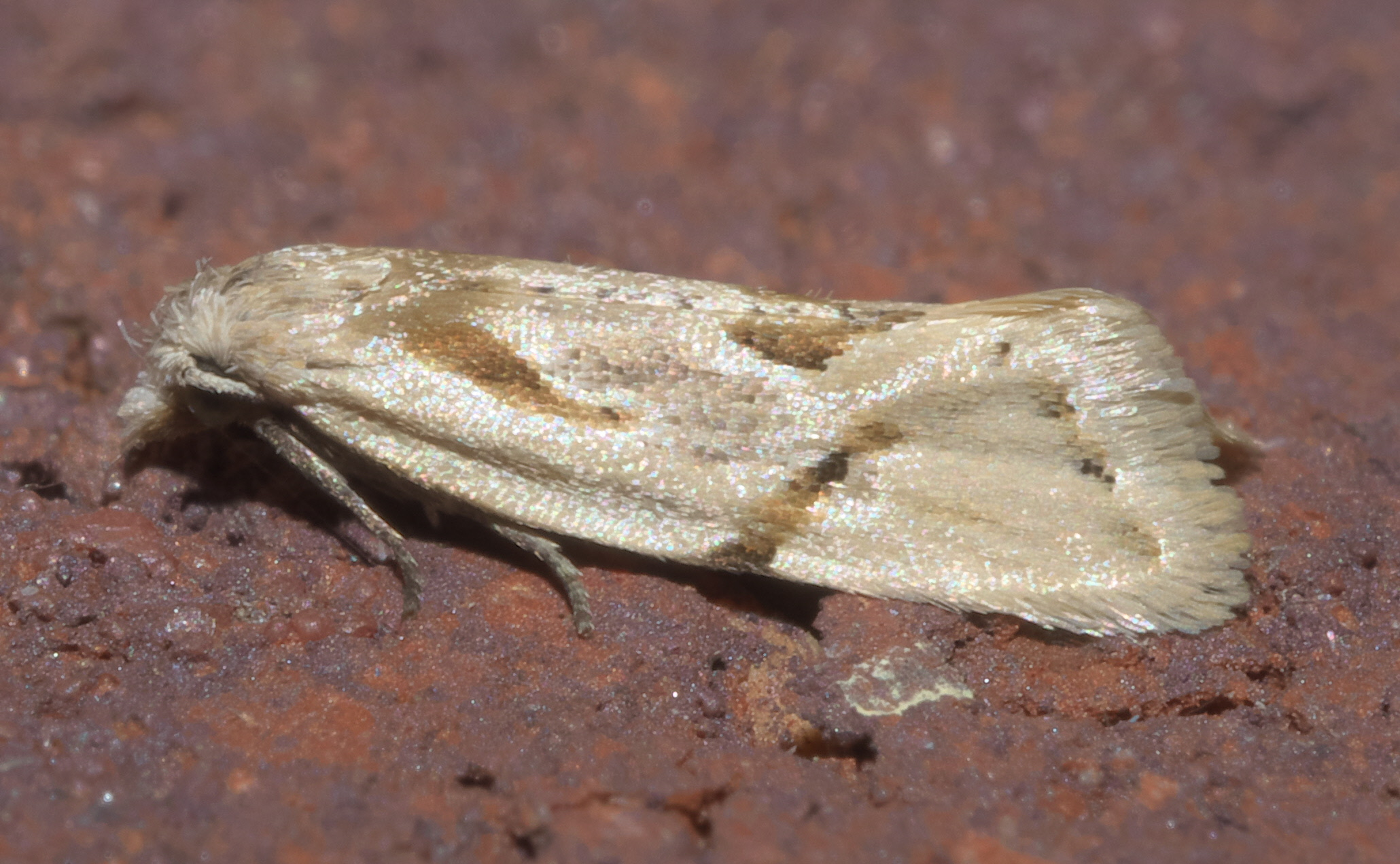

Scientific classification
- Domain: Eukaryota
- Kingdom: Animalia
- Phylum: Arthropoda
- Class: Insecta
- Order: Lepidoptera
- Family: Tortricidae
- Genus: Aethes
- Species: A. baloghi

Binomial name
- Aethes baloghi Sabourin & Metzler, in Sabourin, Miller, Metzler & Vargo, 2002

= Aethes baloghi =

Species of moth

Aethes baloghi is a species of moth of the family Tortricidae. It is found in the United States, where it has been recorded from New York, Illinois, Indiana, Massachusetts, Michigan, Mississippi, Missouri, New Jersey, New York, North Carolina and Virginia. The habitat consists of prairie.

The length of the forewings is 4–6.8 millimetres (0.16–0.27 in). Adults are on wing from March to September, probably in multiple generations per year.

== Etymology ==
The species is named in honor of George J. Balogh.
