= Aethes intactana =

Scientific classification
- Domain: Eukaryota
- Kingdom: Animalia
- Phylum: Arthropoda
- Class: Insecta
- Order: Lepidoptera
- Family: Tortricidae
- Genus: Aethes
- Species: A. intactana

Binomial name
- Aethes intactana (Walsingham, 1879)

Synonyms
- Cochylis intactana Walsingham, 1879

Species of moth

Aethes intactana is a species of moth of the family Tortricidae. It was described by Walsingham in 1879. It is found in the United States, where it has been recorded from California.
