= Aethes inexpecta =

Scientific classification
- Domain: Eukaryota
- Kingdom: Animalia
- Phylum: Arthropoda
- Class: Insecta
- Order: Lepidoptera
- Family: Tortricidae
- Genus: Aethes
- Species: A. inexpecta

Binomial name
- Aethes inexpecta Razowski, 1967

Species of moth

Aethes inexpecta is a species of moth of the family Tortricidae. It was described by Razowski in 1967. It is endemic to Argentina.
