= Aethes geniculata =

Scientific classification
- Domain: Eukaryota
- Kingdom: Animalia
- Phylum: Arthropoda
- Class: Insecta
- Order: Lepidoptera
- Family: Tortricidae
- Genus: Aethes
- Species: A. geniculata

Binomial name
- Aethes geniculata (Meyrick, 1930)

Synonyms
- Phalonia geniculata Meyrick, 1930

Species of moth

Aethes geniculata is a species of moth of the family Tortricidae. It was described by Edward Meyrick in 1930. It is found in Assam, India.
