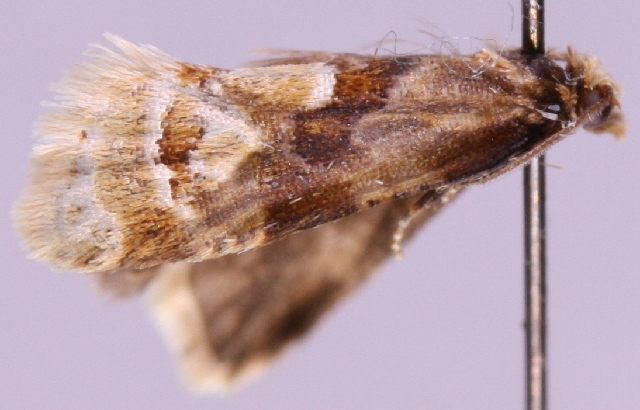

Scientific classification
- Domain: Eukaryota
- Kingdom: Animalia
- Phylum: Arthropoda
- Class: Insecta
- Order: Lepidoptera
- Family: Tortricidae
- Genus: Aethes
- Species: A. kyrkii

Binomial name
- Aethes kyrkii Itämies & Mutanen, in Itämies, Mutanen & Lankinen, 2003

= Aethes kyrkii =

Species of moth

Aethes kyrkii is a species of moth of the family Tortricidae. It is found in northern Finland.
