= Aethes hoenei =

Scientific classification
- Domain: Eukaryota
- Kingdom: Animalia
- Phylum: Arthropoda
- Class: Insecta
- Order: Lepidoptera
- Family: Tortricidae
- Genus: Aethes
- Species: A. hoenei

Binomial name
- Aethes hoenei Razowski, 1964

Species of moth

Aethes hoenei is a species of moth of the family Tortricidae. It was described by Razowski in 1964. It is found in Russia (the southern Ural), Japan and China (Hunan, Jiangxi, Liaoning, Shaanxi, Zhejiang).
