= Aethes pamirana =

Scientific classification
- Domain: Eukaryota
- Kingdom: Animalia
- Phylum: Arthropoda
- Class: Insecta
- Order: Lepidoptera
- Family: Tortricidae
- Genus: Aethes
- Species: A. pamirana

Binomial name
- Aethes pamirana Razowski, 1967

Synonyms
- Aethes amseli pamirana Razowski, 1967

Species of moth

Aethes pamirana is a species of moth of the family Tortricidae. It was described by Razowski in 1967. It is endemic to Afghanistan.
