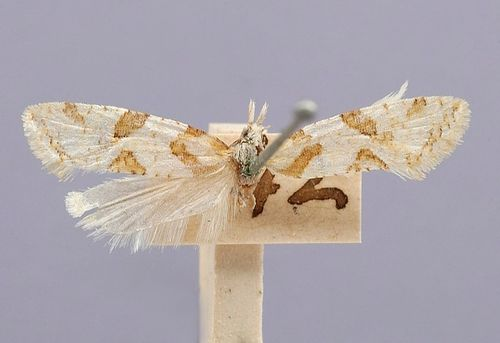

Scientific classification
- Kingdom: Animalia
- Phylum: Arthropoda
- Class: Insecta
- Order: Lepidoptera
- Family: Tortricidae
- Genus: Aethes
- Species: A. fernaldana

Binomial name
- Aethes fernaldana (Walsingham, 1879)

Synonyms
- Cochylis fernaldana Walsingham, 1879

= Aethes fernaldana =

Species of moth

Aethes fernaldana is a species of moth of the family Tortricidae. It was described by Walsingham in 1879. It is found in the United States, where it has been recorded from California, Oregon, Indiana and Ohio. Sightings have been made in parts of Canada as well.
