= Aethes caucasica =

Scientific classification
- Domain: Eukaryota
- Kingdom: Animalia
- Phylum: Arthropoda
- Class: Insecta
- Order: Lepidoptera
- Family: Tortricidae
- Genus: Aethes
- Species: A. caucasica

Binomial name
- Aethes caucasica (Amsel, 1959)

Synonyms
- Lozopera caucasica Amsel, 1959; Aethes caucasia; Aethes elsana Razowski, 1961

Species of moth

Aethes caucasica is a species of moth of the family Tortricidae. It was described by Hans Georg Amsel in 1959. It is found in Italy, Bulgaria, Romania, Russia, the Near East and Georgia.

The wingspan is about 17 millimetres (0.67 in). Adults are on wing May to July.
