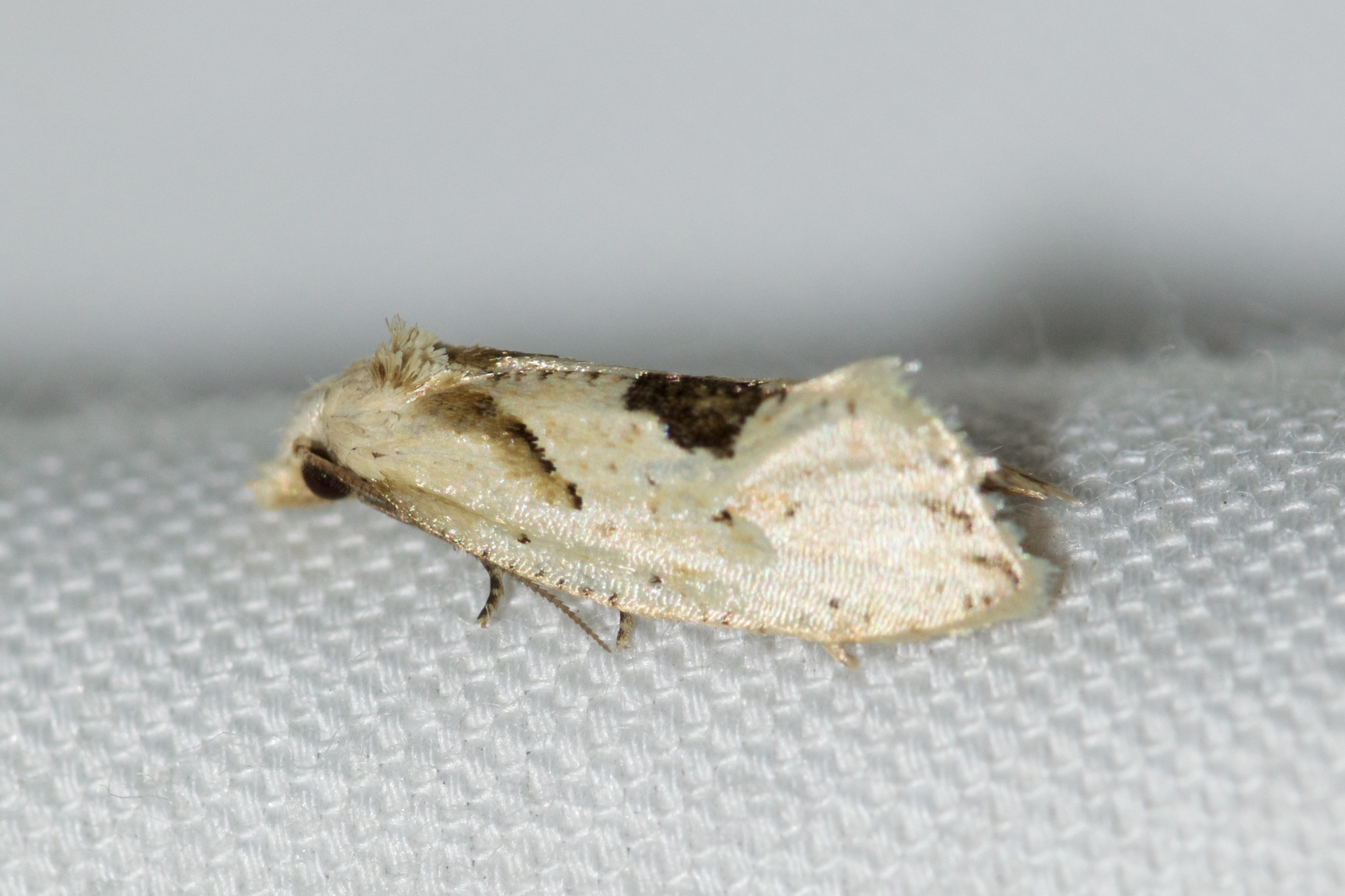

Scientific classification
- Kingdom: Animalia
- Phylum: Arthropoda
- Clade: Pancrustacea
- Class: Insecta
- Order: Lepidoptera
- Family: Tortricidae
- Genus: Aethes
- Species: A. mymara

Binomial name
- Aethes mymara Razowski, 1997

= Aethes mymara =

Species of moth

Aethes mymara, the dark-spotted aethes, is a species of moth of the family Tortricidae. It was named by Razowski in 1997. It is found in North America, where it has been recorded from south-eastern Canada and the north-eastern United States, including Connecticut, Indiana, Massachusetts, North Carolina, Ontario, Tennessee and Washington.

The wingspan is 16 millimetres (0.63 in). Adults have been recorded on wing between May and August.
