= Aethes austera =

Scientific classification
- Kingdom: Animalia
- Phylum: Arthropoda
- Class: Insecta
- Order: Lepidoptera
- Family: Tortricidae
- Genus: Aethes
- Species: A. austera

Binomial name
- Aethes austera Razowski, 1967

Species of moth

Aethes austera is a species of moth of the family Tortricidae. It is found in Paraná, Brazil.
