= Aethes delotypa =

Scientific classification
- Domain: Eukaryota
- Kingdom: Animalia
- Phylum: Arthropoda
- Class: Insecta
- Order: Lepidoptera
- Family: Tortricidae
- Genus: Aethes
- Species: A. delotypa

Binomial name
- Aethes delotypa Razowski, 1970

Species of moth

Aethes delotypa is a species of moth of the family Tortricidae. It was described by Razowski in 1970. It is found in China (Xizang, Yunnan).
