= Aethes evanida =

Scientific classification
- Kingdom: Animalia
- Phylum: Arthropoda
- Clade: Pancrustacea
- Class: Insecta
- Order: Lepidoptera
- Family: Tortricidae
- Genus: Aethes
- Species: A. evanida

Binomial name
- Aethes evanida Razowski & Becker, 1983

Species of moth

Aethes evanida is a species of moth of the family Tortricidae. It is found in Paraná, Brazil.
