= Aethes rectilineana =

Scientific classification
- Kingdom: Animalia
- Phylum: Arthropoda
- Class: Insecta
- Order: Lepidoptera
- Family: Tortricidae
- Genus: Aethes
- Species: A. rectilineana

Binomial name
- Aethes rectilineana (Caradja, 1939)

Synonyms
- Loxopera rectilineana Caradja, 1939; Aethes (Lozopera) bradleyi Razowski, 1962

Species of moth

Aethes rectilineana is a species of moth of the family, Tortricidae. It was described by Aristide Caradja in 1939. It is found in China (Gansu, Heilongjiang, Henan, Hubei, Jiangsu, Shandong, Shanxi, Xinjiang, Zhejiang), Japan, Korea, Mongolia, and Russia.
