= Aethes elpidia =

Scientific classification
- Domain: Eukaryota
- Kingdom: Animalia
- Phylum: Arthropoda
- Class: Insecta
- Order: Lepidoptera
- Family: Tortricidae
- Genus: Aethes
- Species: A. elpidia

Binomial name
- Aethes elpidia Razowski, 1983

Species of moth

Aethes elpidia is a species of moth of the family Tortricidae. It was described by Razowski in 1983. It is endemic to Tunisia.
