= Aethes sonorae =

Streaked aethes moth

Scientific classification
- Domain: Eukaryota
- Kingdom: Animalia
- Phylum: Arthropoda
- Class: Insecta
- Order: Lepidoptera
- Family: Tortricidae
- Genus: Aethes
- Species: A. sonorae

Binomial name
- Aethes sonorae (Walsingham, 1884)

Synonyms
- Conchylis sonorae Walsingham, 1884

Species of moth

Aethes sonorae, the streaked aethes moth, is a species of small (13 millimetres (0.51 in) wingspan) moth in the family Tortricidae, described by Walsingham in Sonora (Mexico) in 1884 and since recorded from the southern United States.
