= Aethes ardezana =

Scientific classification
- Domain: Eukaryota
- Kingdom: Animalia
- Phylum: Arthropoda
- Class: Insecta
- Order: Lepidoptera
- Family: Tortricidae
- Genus: Aethes
- Species: A. ardezana

Binomial name
- Aethes ardezana (Muller-Rutz, 1922)

Synonyms
- Phalonia ardezana Muller-Rutz, 1922

Species of moth

Aethes ardezana is a species of moth of the family Tortricidae. It is found in Switzerland, Austria, Germany, Italy, former Yugoslavia, southern France and Spain.

The wingspan is 19–21 mm. Adults have been recorded on wing in June and July.
