= Aethes pardaliana =

Scientific classification
- Domain: Eukaryota
- Kingdom: Animalia
- Phylum: Arthropoda
- Class: Insecta
- Order: Lepidoptera
- Family: Tortricidae
- Genus: Aethes
- Species: A. pardaliana

Binomial name
- Aethes pardaliana (Kennel, 1899)

Synonyms
- Cochylis pardaliana Kennel, 1899

Species of moth

Aethes pardaliana is a moth of the family Tortricidae. It was described by Kennel in 1899. It is found in Turkmenistan, northern Iran, eastern Afghanistan and China (Xinjiang).
