= Aethes shakibai =

Scientific classification
- Kingdom: Animalia
- Phylum: Arthropoda
- Class: Insecta
- Order: Lepidoptera
- Family: Tortricidae
- Genus: Aethes
- Species: A. shakibai

Binomial name
- Aethes shakibai Huemer & Wieser, 2004

Species of moth

Aethes shakibai is a moth of the family Tortricidae. It is only known from the Miankaleh peninsula at the Caspian Sea in northern Iran. The species was discovered in 2001 and described in 2004. It was named for Ing. Mahmood Shakiba from Iran.

The length of the forewings is 4.5–4.8 mm (0.18–0.19 in) and the wingspan is 9.9–10.6 mm (0.39–0.42 in).

Its food plants are unknown.
