= Aethes alphitopa =

Scientific classification
- Domain: Eukaryota
- Kingdom: Animalia
- Phylum: Arthropoda
- Class: Insecta
- Order: Lepidoptera
- Family: Tortricidae
- Genus: Aethes
- Species: A. alphitopa

Binomial name
- Aethes alphitopa (Clarke, 1968)

Synonyms
- Hysterosia alphitopa Clarke, 1968; Phtheochroa alphitopa

Species of moth

Aethes alphitopa is a species of moth of the family Tortricidae. It is found in Venezuela and Colombia.
