= Aethes bicuspis =

Scientific classification
- Kingdom: Animalia
- Phylum: Arthropoda
- Clade: Pancrustacea
- Class: Insecta
- Order: Lepidoptera
- Family: Tortricidae
- Genus: Aethes
- Species: A. bicuspis

Binomial name
- Aethes bicuspis Razowski & Becker, 2002

Species of moth

Aethes bicuspis is a species of moth of the family Tortricidae. It is found in Goiás, Brazil.

The wingspan is 12 mm for males and 14 mm for females.
