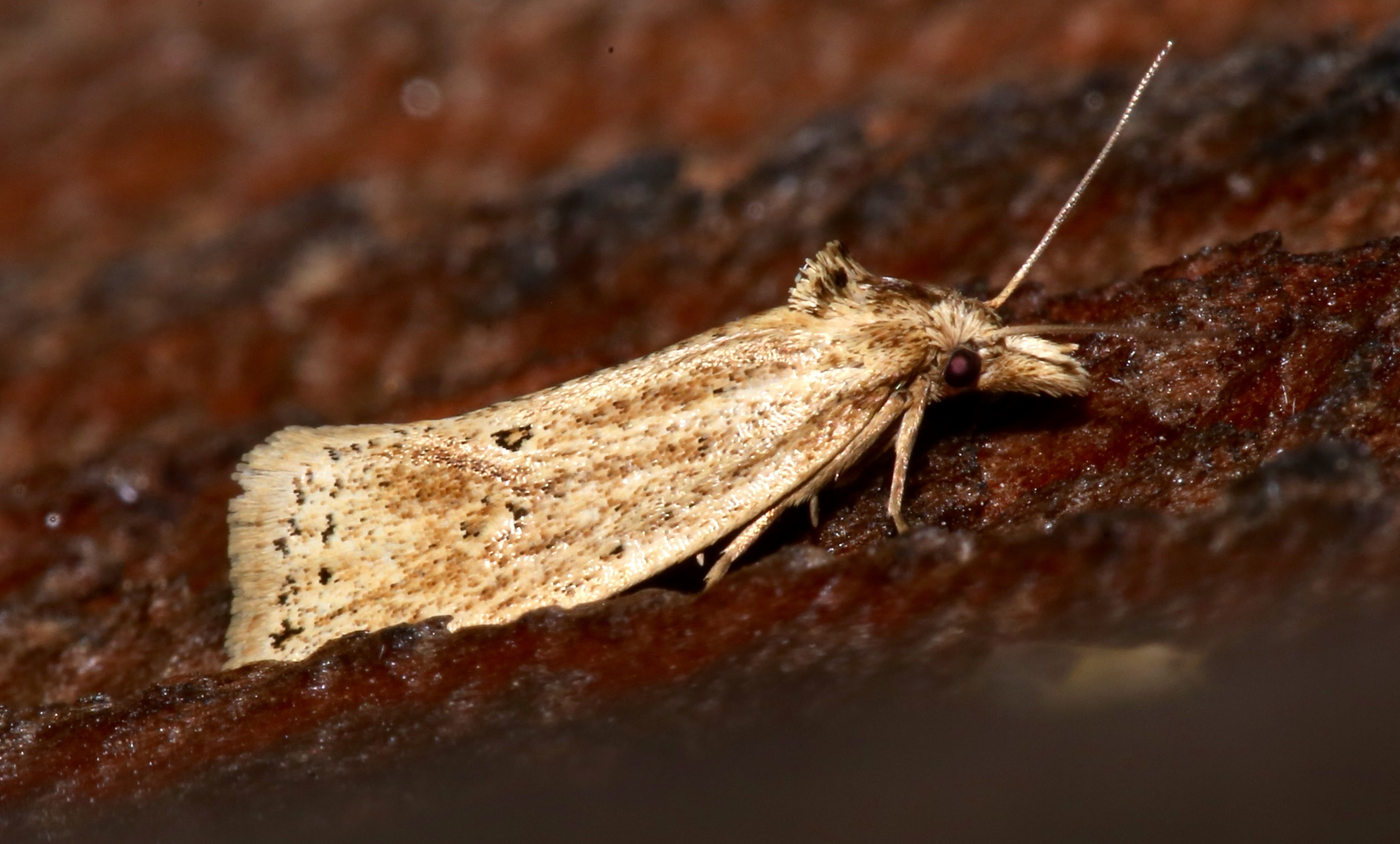

Scientific classification
- Domain: Eukaryota
- Kingdom: Animalia
- Phylum: Arthropoda
- Class: Insecta
- Order: Lepidoptera
- Family: Tortricidae
- Genus: Aethes
- Species: A. atomosana

Binomial name
- Aethes atomosana (Busck, 1907)

Synonyms
- Phalonia atomosana Busck, 1907

= Aethes atomosana =

Species of moth

Aethes atomosana, the two-spotted aethes, is a species of moth of the family Tortricidae. It is found in North America, where it has been recorded from Nova Scotia, Ontario, Illinois, Indiana, Maryland, Michigan, Pennsylvania, Vermont and Wisconsin.

The length of the forewings is 6.6–9.8 mm. The forewings are light ochreous, suffused with darker ochreous scales. The hindwings are light ochreous fuscous. Adults are on wing from June to September, probably in one generation per year.
