= Aethes flava =

Scientific classification
- Domain: Eukaryota
- Kingdom: Animalia
- Phylum: Arthropoda
- Class: Insecta
- Order: Lepidoptera
- Family: Tortricidae
- Genus: Aethes
- Species: A. flava

Binomial name
- Aethes flava (Kuznetzov, 1970)

Synonyms
- Lozopera flava Kuznetzov, 1970

Species of moth

Aethes flava is a species of moth of the family Tortricidae. It is found in Primorsky Krai in the Russian Far East.
