= Aethes iranica =

Scientific classification
- Domain: Eukaryota
- Kingdom: Animalia
- Phylum: Arthropoda
- Class: Insecta
- Order: Lepidoptera
- Family: Tortricidae
- Genus: Aethes
- Species: A. iranica

Binomial name
- Aethes iranica Razowski, 1963

Species of moth

Aethes iranica is a species of moth of the family Tortricidae. It was described by Razowski, 1963. It is found in Asia Minor and Iran.
