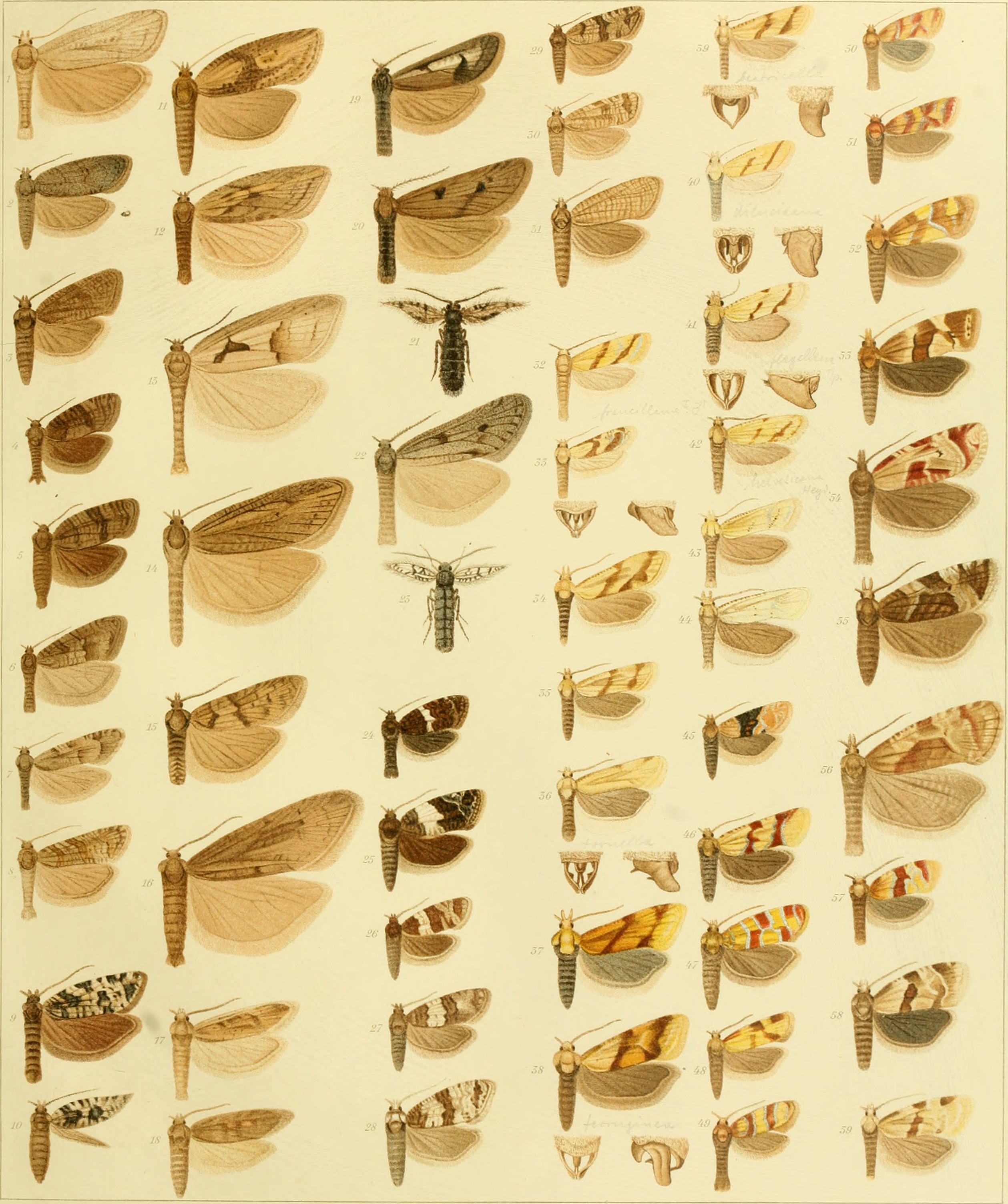
- Aethes ferruginea as Loxopera ferruginea in Die palaearktischen tortriciden (figure 38)

Scientific classification
- Domain: Eukaryota
- Kingdom: Animalia
- Phylum: Arthropoda
- Class: Insecta
- Order: Lepidoptera
- Family: Tortricidae
- Genus: Aethes
- Species: A. ferruginea

Binomial name
- Aethes ferruginea (Walsingham, 1900)

Synonyms
- Loxopera ferruginea Walsingham, 1900

= Aethes ferruginea =

Species of moth

Aethes ferruginea is a species of moth of the family Tortricidae. It was described by Walsingham in 1900. It is endemic to Syria.
