= Aethes sulphurosana =

Scientific classification
- Domain: Eukaryota
- Kingdom: Animalia
- Phylum: Arthropoda
- Class: Insecta
- Order: Lepidoptera
- Family: Tortricidae
- Genus: Aethes
- Species: A. perfidana

Binomial name
- Aethes perfidana (Kennel, 1901)

Synonyms
- Conchylis sulphurosana Kennel, 1901

Species of moth

Aethes sulphurosana is a species of moth of the family Tortricidae. It was described by Kennel in 1901. It is endemic to Algeria.
