= Aethes mordax =

Scientific classification
- Kingdom: Animalia
- Phylum: Arthropoda
- Class: Insecta
- Order: Lepidoptera
- Family: Tortricidae
- Genus: Aethes
- Species: A. mordax

Binomial name
- Aethes mordax (Meyrick, 1917)

Synonyms
- Phalonia mordax Meyrick, 1917

Species of moth

Aethes mordax is a species of moth of the family Tortricidae. It is found in Argentina and Brazil (Parana, Minas Gerais).
