= Aethes margaritifera =

Scientific classification
- Domain: Eukaryota
- Kingdom: Animalia
- Phylum: Arthropoda
- Class: Insecta
- Order: Lepidoptera
- Family: Tortricidae
- Genus: Aethes
- Species: A. margaritifera

Binomial name
- Aethes margaritifera Falkovitsh, 1963

Species of moth

Aethes margaritifera is a species of moth of the family Tortricidae. It is found in Bulgaria, Ukraine, Russia, Kazakhstan and Armenia.

The wingspan is about 17 millimetres (0.67 in). Adults are on wing in March and from May to July.
