= Aethes taiwanica =

Scientific classification
- Domain: Eukaryota
- Kingdom: Animalia
- Phylum: Arthropoda
- Class: Insecta
- Order: Lepidoptera
- Family: Tortricidae
- Genus: Aethes
- Species: A. taiwanica

Binomial name
- Aethes taiwanica Razowski, 1977

Synonyms
- Aethes cnicana taiwanica Razowski, 1977

Species of moth

Aethes taiwanica is a species of moth of the family Tortricidae. It was described by Razowski in 1977. It is endemic to Taiwan.
