= Aethes olibra =

Scientific classification
- Domain: Eukaryota
- Kingdom: Animalia
- Phylum: Arthropoda
- Class: Insecta
- Order: Lepidoptera
- Family: Tortricidae
- Genus: Aethes
- Species: A. olibra

Binomial name
- Aethes olibra Razowski, 1994

Species of moth

Aethes olibra is a species of moth of the family Tortricidae. It was described by Razowski in 1994. It is endemic to Jamaica.
