= Aethes semicircularis =

Scientific classification
- Domain: Eukaryota
- Kingdom: Animalia
- Phylum: Arthropoda
- Class: Insecta
- Order: Lepidoptera
- Family: Tortricidae
- Genus: Aethes
- Species: A. semicircularis

Binomial name
- Aethes semicircularis Y.H. Sun & H.H. Li, 2013

Species of moth

Aethes semicircularis is a species of moth of the family Tortricidae. It is found in China (Henan, Jilin, Ningxia, Shaanxi, Shanxi).

The wingspan is 11−15 mm.
