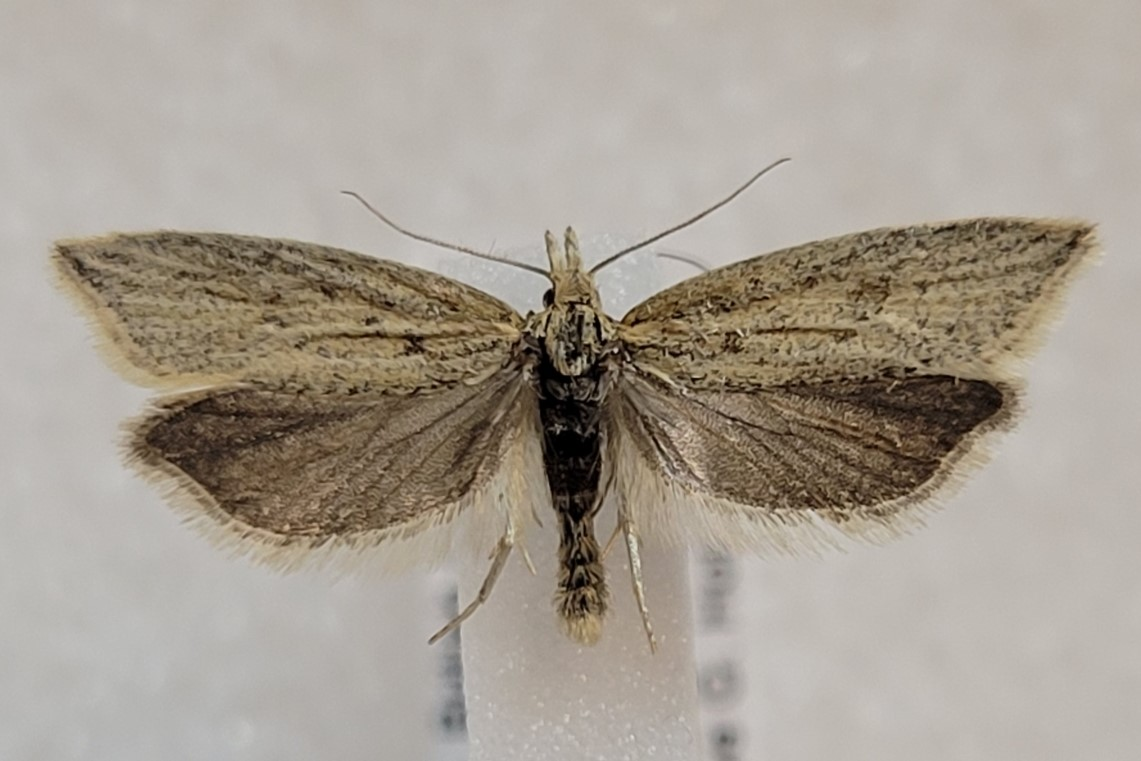

Scientific classification
- Domain: Eukaryota
- Kingdom: Animalia
- Phylum: Arthropoda
- Class: Insecta
- Order: Lepidoptera
- Family: Tortricidae
- Genus: Aethes
- Species: A. monera

Binomial name
- Aethes monera Razowski, 1986

= Aethes monera =

Species of moth

Aethes monera is a species of moth of the family Tortricidae. It was first described by Razowski in 1986. It is found in North America, where it has been recorded from Canada (Alberta and Saskatchewan) to Mexico (Durango).

== Subspecies ==
- Aethes monera monera
- Aethes monera septentrionalis Razowski, 1997 (Canada)
