= Aethes affinis =

Scientific classification
- Domain: Eukaryota
- Kingdom: Animalia
- Phylum: Arthropoda
- Class: Insecta
- Order: Lepidoptera
- Family: Tortricidae
- Genus: Aethes
- Species: A. affinis

Binomial name
- Aethes affinis Razowski, 1967

Species of moth

Aethes affinis is a moth of the family Tortricidae. It is known only from Costa Rica.
