= Aethes cinereoviridana =

Scientific classification
- Domain: Eukaryota
- Kingdom: Animalia
- Phylum: Arthropoda
- Class: Insecta
- Order: Lepidoptera
- Family: Tortricidae
- Genus: Aethes
- Species: A. cinereoviridana

Binomial name
- Aethes cinereoviridana (Kennel, 1899)

Synonyms
- Cochylis cinereoviridana Kennel, 1899

Species of moth

Aethes cinereoviridana is a species of moth of the family Tortricidae. It was described by Kennel in 1899. It is found in Xinjiang, China and other places in Central Asia.
