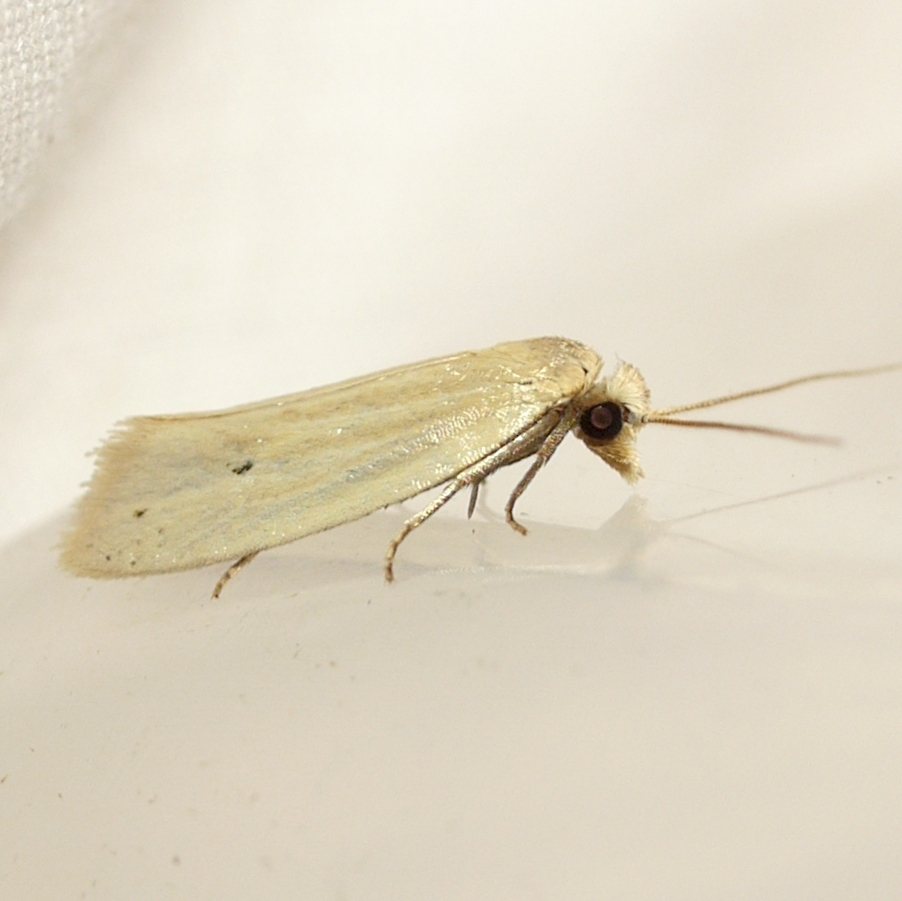

Scientific classification
- Kingdom: Animalia
- Phylum: Arthropoda
- Class: Insecta
- Order: Lepidoptera
- Family: Tortricidae
- Genus: Aethes
- Species: A. spartinana

Binomial name
- Aethes spartinana (Barnes & McDunnough, 1916)

Synonyms
- Phalonia spartinana Barnes & McDunnough, 1916

= Aethes spartinana =

Species of moth

Aethes spartinana is a species of moth of the family Tortricidae first described by William Barnes and James Halliday McDunnough in 1916. It is found in North America, where it has been recorded from Illinois, Indiana, Iowa, Maine, Massachusetts and South Dakota.

The wingspan is 19–23 millimetres (0.75–0.91 in). Adults have been recorded on wing in January and from July to September.

The larvae feed on Spartina pectinata. They bore though the glumes and feed on the florets inside.
