= Aethes annosa =

Scientific classification
- Kingdom: Animalia
- Phylum: Arthropoda
- Class: Insecta
- Order: Lepidoptera
- Family: Tortricidae
- Genus: Aethes
- Species: A. annosa

Binomial name
- Aethes annosa Razowski, 1967

Species of moth

Aethes annosa is a species of moth of the family Tortricidae. It is found in Peru.
