= Aethes subcitreoflava =

Scientific classification
- Domain: Eukaryota
- Kingdom: Animalia
- Phylum: Arthropoda
- Class: Insecta
- Order: Lepidoptera
- Family: Tortricidae
- Genus: Aethes
- Species: A. subcitreoflava

Binomial name
- Aethes subcitreoflava Y.H. Sun & H.H. Li, 2013

Species of moth

Aethes subcitreoflava is a species of moth of the family Tortricidae. It is found in China (Gansu, Inner Mongolia, Jilin, Shanxi).

The wingspan is 8–20 millimetres (0.31–0.79 in).
