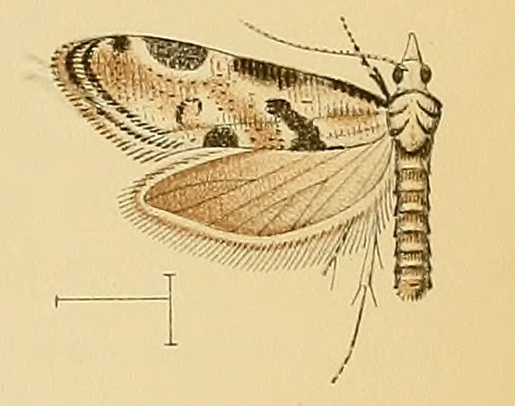

Scientific classification
- Domain: Eukaryota
- Kingdom: Animalia
- Phylum: Arthropoda
- Class: Insecta
- Order: Lepidoptera
- Family: Tortricidae
- Genus: Aethes
- Species: A. conversana

Binomial name
- Aethes conversana (Walsingham, 1907)

Synonyms
- Phalonia conversana Walsingham, 1907

= Aethes conversana =

Species of moth

Aethes conversana is a moth of the family Tortricidae. It was described by Walsingham in 1907. It is found on the Canary Islands, and in Spain and Iran.

The wingspan is 9–14.5 millimetres (0.35–0.57 in).

The larvae possibly feed on Artemisia canariensis.
