= Aethes macasiana =

Scientific classification
- Kingdom: Animalia
- Phylum: Arthropoda
- Class: Insecta
- Order: Lepidoptera
- Family: Tortricidae
- Genus: Aethes
- Species: A. macasiana

Binomial name
- Aethes macasiana Razowski & Pelz, 2001

Species of moth

Aethes macasiana is a species of moth of the family Tortricidae. It is found in Ecuador (Morona-Santiago Province). Józef Razowski and Volker Pelz published its scientific name in 2001.
