= Aethes rubiginana =

Scientific classification
- Domain: Eukaryota
- Kingdom: Animalia
- Phylum: Arthropoda
- Class: Insecta
- Order: Lepidoptera
- Family: Tortricidae
- Genus: Aethes
- Species: A. rubiginana

Binomial name
- Aethes rubiginana (Walsingham, 1903)

Synonyms
- Loxopera rubiginana Walsingham, 1903; Aethes rubiginea Razowski, 1962

Species of moth

Aethes rubiginana is a species of moth of the family Tortricidae. It was described by Walsingham in 1903. It is found in on Sicily and in Gibraltar, Italy, Morocco and Algeria.

The wingspan is 14–15 millimetres (0.55–0.59 in). The forewings are shining silvery white on the apical third and suffused with rust brown in the remaining area. The hindwings are pale grey. Adults are on wing from April to May.

The larvae feed on Ferula communis and Thapsia species.
