= Aethes =

- Aethes angulatana

Scientific classification
- Domain: Eukaryota
- Kingdom: Animalia
- Phylum: Arthropoda
- Class: Insecta
- Order: Lepidoptera
- Family: Tortricidae
- Tribe: Cochylini
- Genus: Aethes; Billberg, 1820

Synonyms
- Argyridea Waterhouse, 1902; Argyridia Stephens, 1852; Chlidonia Hübner, [1825] 1816; Chrosis Guenée, 1845; Cirriaethes Razowski, 1962; Coecaethes Obraztsov, 1943; Dapsilia Hübner, [1825] 1816; Loxopera Agassiz, 1848; Lozopera Stephens, 1829; Phalonia Hübner, [1825] 1816; Phelonia Stephens, 1834

Genus of tortrix moths

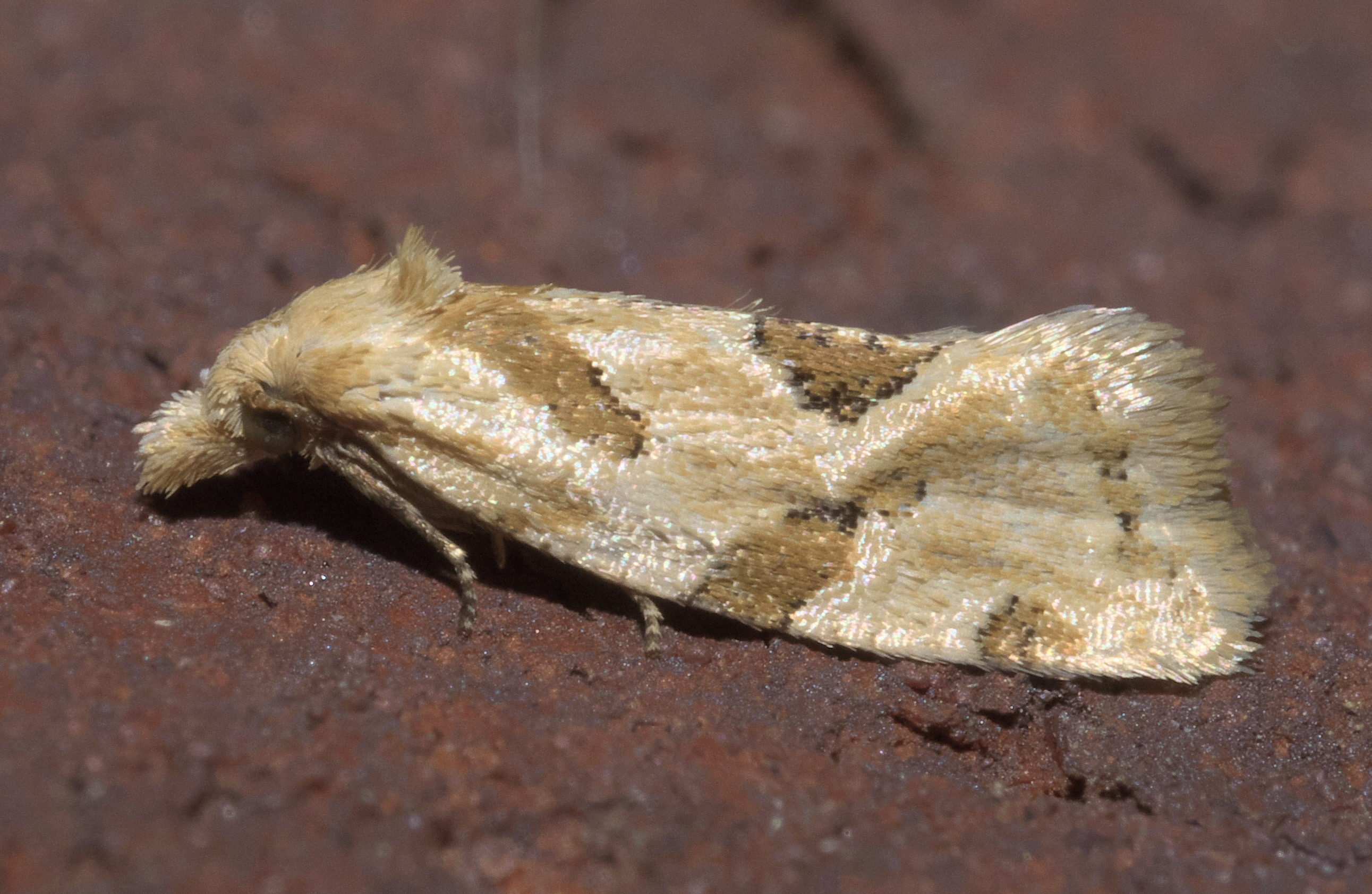
Aethes

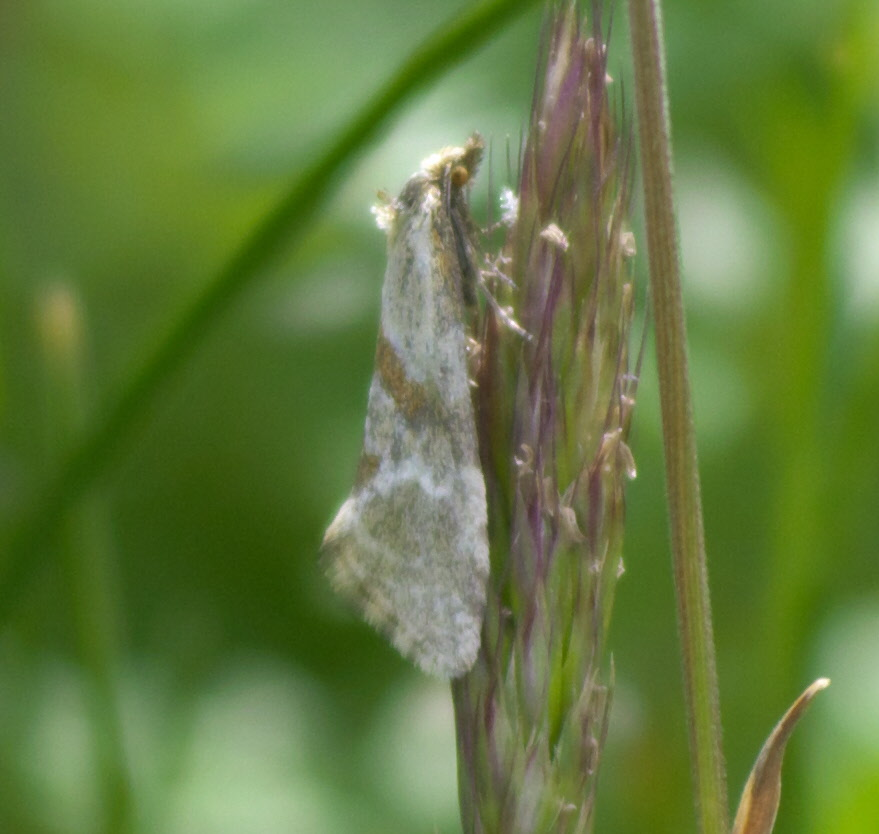
Aethes

Aethes is a genus of moths belonging to the subfamily Tortricinae of the family Tortricidae.

== Species ==
- Aethes acerba Y.H. Sun & H.H. Li, 2013
- Aethes affinis Razowski, 1967
- Aethes afghana Razowski, 1983
- Aethes alatavica (Danilevsky, in Danilevsky, Kuznetsov & Falkovitsh, 1962)
- Aethes albogrisea Razowski & Wojtusiak, 2009
- Aethes alphitopa (Clarke, 1968)
- Aethes amseli Razowski, 1967
- Aethes amurensis Razowski, 1964
- Aethes angulatana (Robinson, 1869)
- Aethes angustana (Clemens, 1860)
- Aethes annosa Razowski, 1967
- Aethes ardezana (Muller-Rutz, 1922)
- Aethes argentilimitana (Robinson, 1869)
- Aethes argyrospila Karisch, 2005
- Aethes atlasi (Razowski, 1962)
- Aethes atmospila (Meyrick in Caradja & Meyrick, 1937)
- Aethes atomosana (Busck, 1907)
- Aethes aurofasciana (Mann, 1855)
- Aethes austera Razowski, 1967
- Aethes baloghi Sabourin & Metzler, in Sabourin, Miller, Metzler & Vargo, 2002
- Aethes beatricella (Walsingham, 1898)
- Aethes bicuspis Razowski & Becker, 2002
- Aethes bilbaensis (Rssler, 1877)
- Aethes biscana (Kearfott, 1907)
- Aethes bistigmatus Byun & Li, 2006
- Aethes bomonana (Kearfott, 1907)
- Aethes capnospila (Amsel, 1959)
- Aethes caucasia (Amsel, 1959)
- Aethes chilesi Razowski & Wojtusiak, 2008
- Aethes cinereoviridana (Kennel, 1899)
- Aethes citreoflava Kuznetzov, 1966
- Aethes cnicana (Westwood, in Wood, 1854)
- Aethes confinis Razowski, 1974
- Aethes conomochla (Meyrick, 1933)
- Aethes conversana (Walsingham, 1907)
- Aethes cremonana (Ragonot, 1894)
- Aethes deaurana (Peyerimhoff, 1877)
- Aethes decens Razowski, 1970
- Aethes decimana ([Denis & Schiffermuller], 1775)
- Aethes delotypa Razowski, 1970
- Aethes dentifera Razowski, 1967
- Aethes destituta Razowski, 1983
- Aethes deutschiana (Zetterstedt, 1839)
- Aethes dilucidana (Stephens, 1852)
- Aethes eichleri Razowski, 1983
- Aethes elpidia Razowski, 1983
- Aethes evanida Razowski & Becker, 1983
- Aethes fennicana (Hering, 1924)
- Aethes fernaldana (Walsingham, 1879)
- Aethes ferruginea (Walsingham, 1900)
- Aethes flagellana (Duponchel, in Godart, 1836)
- Aethes flava (Kuznetzov, 1970)
- Aethes floccosana (Walker, 1863)
- Aethes francillana (Fabricius, 1794)
- Aethes furvescens Bai Guo & Guo, 1996
- Aethes geniculata (Meyrick, 1930)
- Aethes grandaeva Razowski & Becker, 1983
- Aethes hartmanniana (Clerck, 1759)
- Aethes heleniana Razowski, 1997
- Aethes hoenei Razowski, 1964
- Aethes ignobilis Razowski, 1994
- Aethes inexpecta Razowski, 1967
- Aethes intactana (Walsingham, 1879)
- Aethes interruptofasciata (Robinson, 1869)
- Aethes iranica Razowski, 1963
- Aethes jonesi Razowski, 1967
- Aethes kandovana Alipanah, 2009
- Aethes kasyi Razowski, 1962
- Aethes kindermanniana (Treitschke, 1830)
- Aethes kyrkii Itämies & Mutanen, in Itämies, Mutanen & Lankinen, 2003
- Aethes labonita Razowski & Wojtusiak, 2013
- Aethes languidana (Mann, 1855)
- Aethes lateritia Razowski, 1970
- Aethes louisiana (Busck, 1907)
- Aethes luteopictana (Kennel, 1900)
- Aethes lygrana Karisch, 1992
- Aethes macasiana Razowski & Pelz, 2001
- Aethes margaritana (Haworth, [1811])
- Aethes margaritifera Falkovitsh, 1963
- Aethes margarotana (Duponchel, in Godart, 1836)
- Aethes matheri Sabourin & Miller, in Sabourin, Miller, Metzler & Vargo, 2002
- Aethes matthewcruzi Sabourin & Vargo, in Sabourin, Miller, Metzler & Vargo, 2002
- Aethes mauritanica (Walsingham, 1898)
- Aethes mesomelana (Walker, 1863)
- Aethes mirifica Razowski & Becker, 1983
- Aethes monera Razowski, 1986
- Aethes mordax (Meyrick, 1917)
- Aethes moribundana (Staudinger, 1859)
- Aethes munda Karisch, 2003
- Aethes mymara Razowski, 1997
- Aethes nefandana (Kennel, 1899)
- Aethes obliquana (Kearfott, 1907)
- Aethes obscurana (Caradja, 1916)
- Aethes olibra Razowski, 1994
- Aethes pamirana (Razowski, 1967)
- Aethes pannosana (Kennel, 1913)
- Aethes pardaliana (Kennel, 1899)
- Aethes patricia Metzler, 2000
- Aethes pemeantensis Gibeaux, 1985
- Aethes perfidana (Kennel, 1901)
- Aethes persica Razowski, 1963
- Aethes piercei Obraztsov, 1952
- Aethes pinara Razowski & Becker, 2007
- Aethes planaltinae Razowski & Becker, 1983
- Aethes portentosa Razowski & Becker, 1983
- Aethes prangana (Kennel, 1900)
- Aethes promptana (Robinson, 1869)
- Aethes rana (Busck, 1907)
- Aethes razowskii Sabourin & Miller, in Sabourin, Miller, Metzler & Vargo, 2002 – Razowski's aethes moth
- Aethes rectilineana (Caradja, 1939)
- Aethes rubigana (Treitschke, 1830)
- Aethes rubiginana (Walsingham, 1903)
- Aethes rutilana (Hubner, [1814-1817])
- Aethes sanguinana (Treitschke, 1830)
- Aethes scalana (Zerny, 1927)
- Aethes semicircularis Y.H. Sun & H.H. Li, 2013
- Aethes seriatana (Zeller, 1875) – seriated aethes moth
- Aethes sexdentata Sabourin & Miller, in Sabourin, Miller, Metzler & Vargo, 2002
- Aethes shakibai Huemer & Wieser, 2004
- Aethes smeathmanniana (Fabricius, 1781) – Smeathmann's aethes moth
- Aethes sonorae (Walsingham, 1884) – streaked aethes moth
- Aethes spartinana (Barnes & McDunnough, 1916)
- Aethes spirana (Kennel, 1899)
- Aethes subcitreoflava Y.H. Sun & H.H. Li, 2013
- Aethes sulphurosana (Kennel, 1901)
- Aethes taiwanica (Razowski, 1977)
- Aethes terriae Sabourin & Miller, in Sabourin, Miller, Metzler & Vargo, 2002
- Aethes tesserana ([Denis & Schiffermuller], 1775)
- Aethes tornella Walsingham, 1898
- Aethes triangulana (Treitschke, 1835)
- Aethes turialba (Busck, 1920)
- Aethes tuxtlana Razowski, 1986
- Aethes vachelliana (Kearfott, 1907)
- Aethes vicinana (Mann, 1859)
- Aethes westratei Sabourin & Miller, in Sabourin, Miller, Metzler & Vargo, 2002
- Aethes williana (Brahm, 1791)
- Aethes xanthina Falkovitsh, 1963

== See also ==
- List of Tortricidae genera
