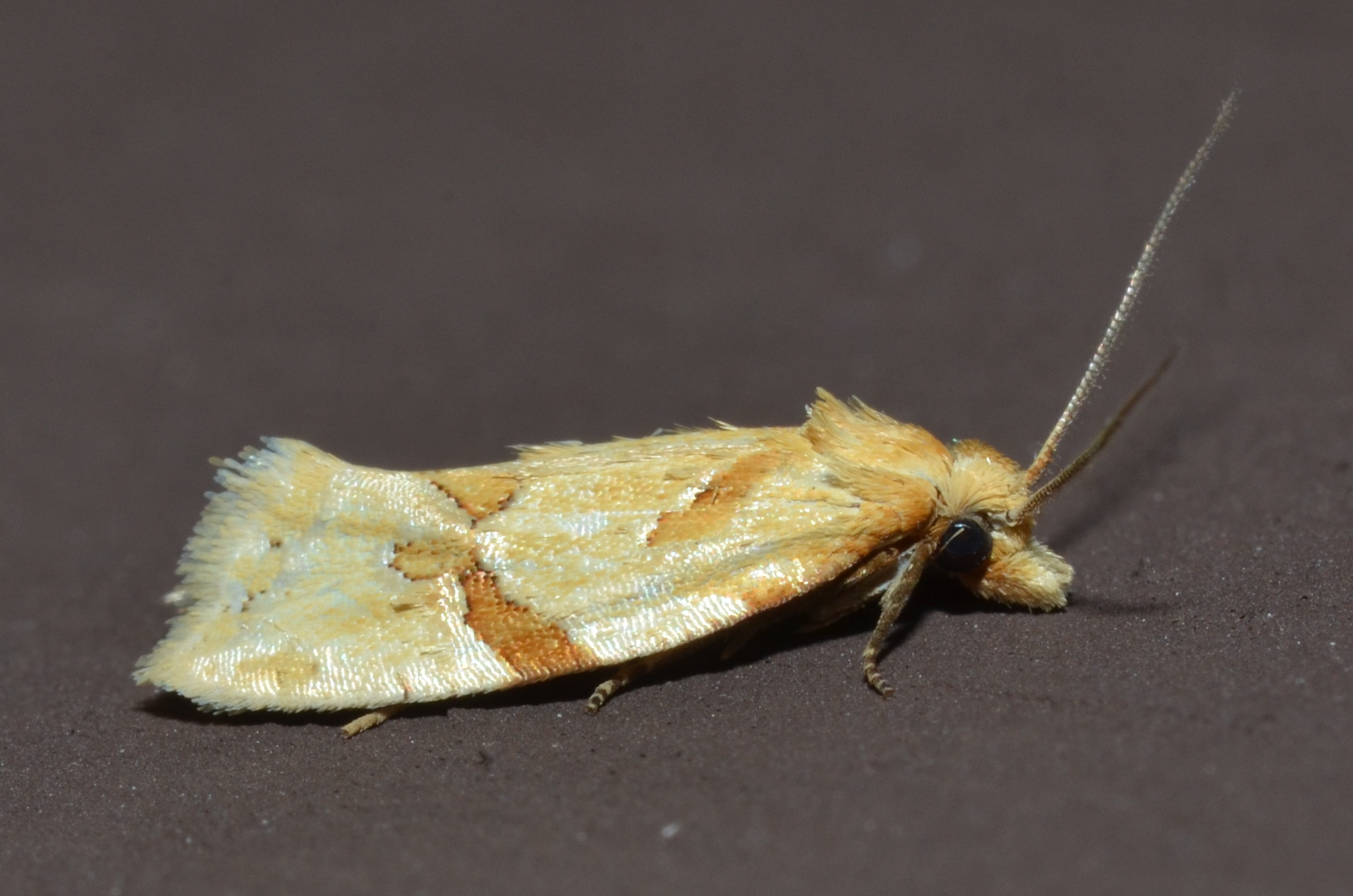

Scientific classification
- Domain: Eukaryota
- Kingdom: Animalia
- Phylum: Arthropoda
- Class: Insecta
- Order: Lepidoptera
- Family: Tortricidae
- Genus: Aethes
- Species: A. patricia

Binomial name
- Aethes patricia Metzler, 2000

= Aethes patricia =

Species of moth

Aethes patricia is a species of moth of the family Tortricidae. It was described by Metzler in 1999. It is found in the United States, where it has been recorded from Indiana, Michigan and Ohio.
