= Aethes argyrospila =

Scientific classification
- Domain: Eukaryota
- Kingdom: Animalia
- Phylum: Arthropoda
- Class: Insecta
- Order: Lepidoptera
- Family: Tortricidae
- Genus: Aethes
- Species: A. argyrospila

Binomial name
- Aethes argyrospila Karisch, 2005

Species of moth

Aethes argyrospila is a species of moth of the family Tortricidae. It is found in Kurdistan Province of Iran and Turkey.
