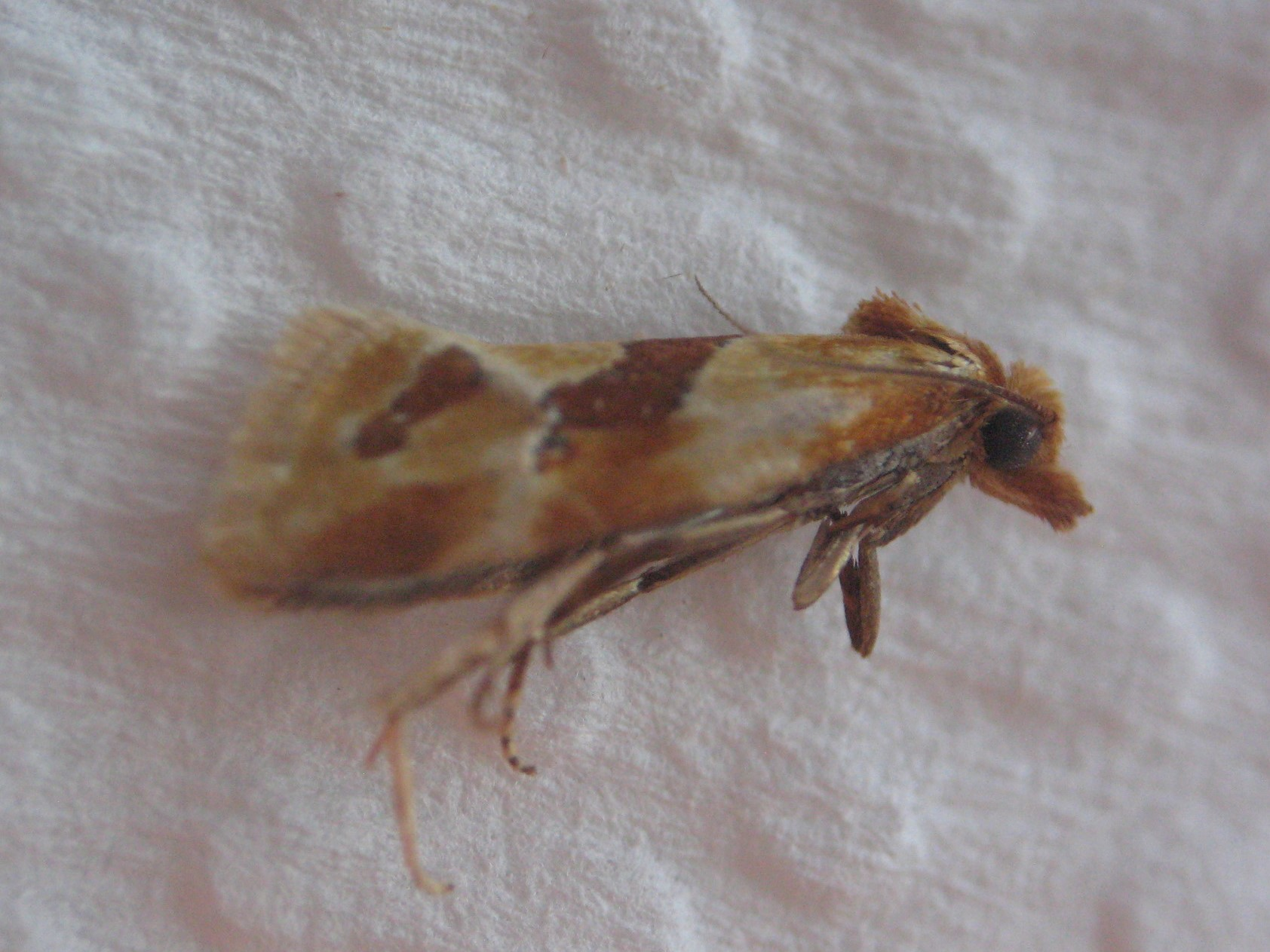

Scientific classification
- Domain: Eukaryota
- Kingdom: Animalia
- Phylum: Arthropoda
- Class: Insecta
- Order: Lepidoptera
- Family: Tortricidae
- Genus: Aethes
- Species: A. louisiana

Binomial name
- Aethes louisiana (Busck, 1907)

Synonyms
- Phalonia louisiana Busck, 1907

= Aethes louisiana =

Species of moth

Aethes louisiana is a species of moth in the family Tortricidae. It is found in the United States, where it has been recorded from Missouri, Illinois and Indiana.

The wingspan is 16–17 millimetres (0.63–0.67 in). The forewings are light shining straw coloured, overlaid with golden yellow and with two dark golden brown fasciae at the base. The hindwings are dark fuscous. Adults are on wing from May to June.
