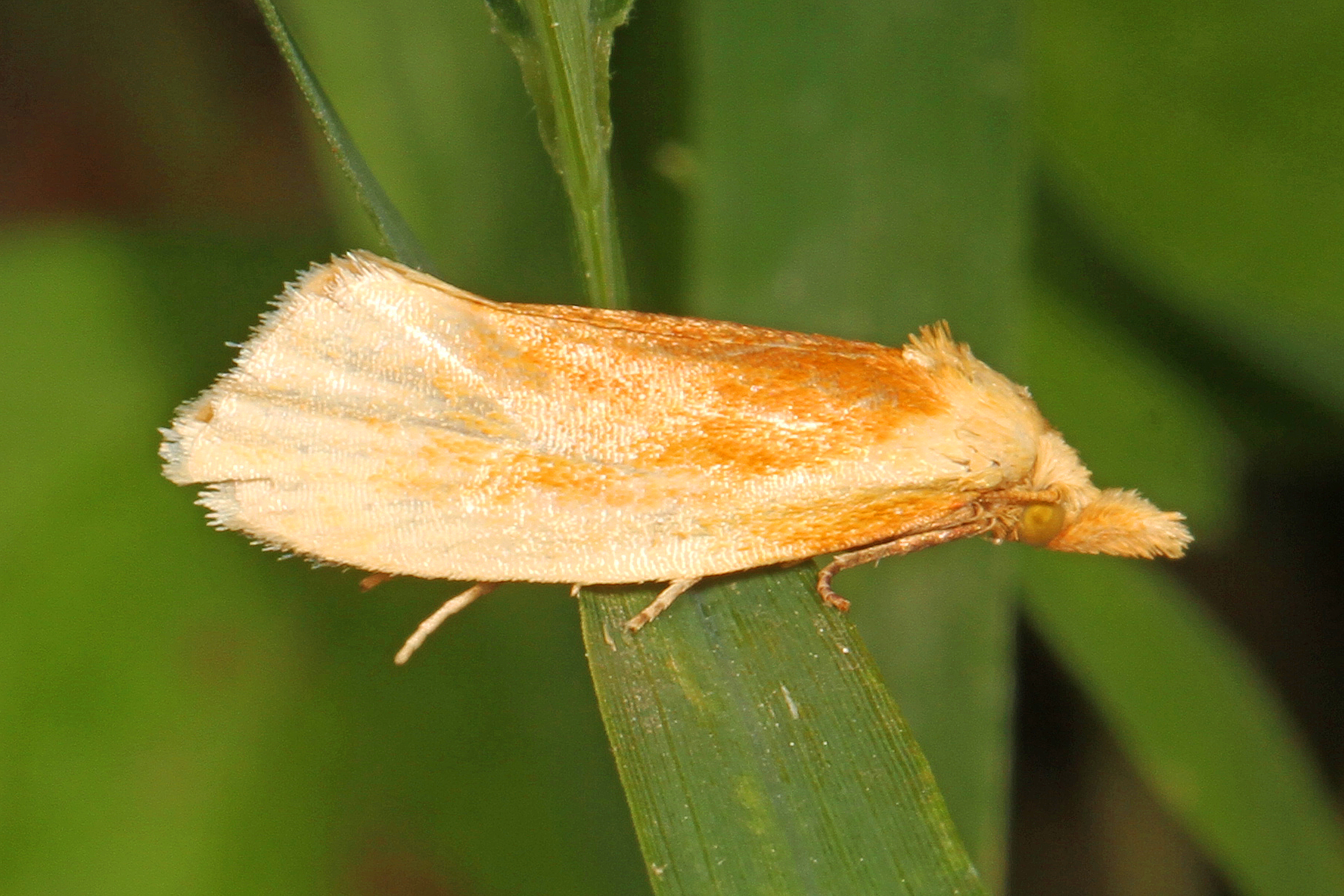
- Tortricid Moth - Aethes floccosana, Andelot Farm, Worton, Maryland

Scientific classification
- Domain: Eukaryota
- Kingdom: Animalia
- Phylum: Arthropoda
- Class: Insecta
- Order: Lepidoptera
- Family: Tortricidae
- Genus: Aethes
- Species: A. floccosana

Binomial name
- Aethes floccosana (Walker, 1863)

Synonyms
- Conchylis floccosana Walker, 1863; Tortrix confusana Robinson, 1869; Aethes flaccosana Powell, 1983

= Aethes floccosana =

Species of moth

Aethes floccosana is a species of moth of the family Tortricidae. It was described by Francis Walker in 1863. It is found in the United States, where it has been recorded from Illinois, Kentucky, Missouri, New Jersey, North Carolina, Ohio and Tennessee.

The wingspan is 16–17 millimetres (0.63–0.67 in). Adults have been recorded on wing from May to July.
