= Aethes munda =

Scientific classification
- Domain: Eukaryota
- Kingdom: Animalia
- Phylum: Arthropoda
- Class: Insecta
- Order: Lepidoptera
- Family: Tortricidae
- Genus: Aethes
- Species: A. munda

Binomial name
- Aethes munda Karisch, 2003

Species of moth

Aethes munda is a species of moth of the family Tortricidae. It is found in Turkey.
