= Aethes albogrisea =

Scientific classification
- Domain: Eukaryota
- Kingdom: Animalia
- Phylum: Arthropoda
- Class: Insecta
- Order: Lepidoptera
- Family: Tortricidae
- Genus: Aethes
- Species: A. albogrisea

Binomial name
- Aethes albogrisea Razowski & Wojtusiak, 2009

Species of moth

Aethes albogrisea is a species of moth of the family Tortricidae. It was described by Razowski and Wojtusiak in 2009. It is found in Morona-Santiago Province, Ecuador.

The wingspan is about 20.5 millimetres (0.81 in).
