= Aethes labonita =

Scientific classification
- Domain: Eukaryota
- Kingdom: Animalia
- Phylum: Arthropoda
- Class: Insecta
- Order: Lepidoptera
- Family: Tortricidae
- Genus: Aethes
- Species: A. labonita

Binomial name
- Aethes labonita Razowski & Wojtusiak, 2013

Species of moth

Aethes labonita is a species of moth of the family Tortricidae. It was described by Razowski & Wojtusiak in 2013. It is found in Sucumbíos Province, Ecuador.

The wingspan is about 30 millimetres (1.2 in).

== Etymology ==
The species name refers to La Bonita, the type locality.
