= Aethes pannosana =

Scientific classification
- Domain: Eukaryota
- Kingdom: Animalia
- Phylum: Arthropoda
- Class: Insecta
- Order: Lepidoptera
- Family: Tortricidae
- Genus: Aethes
- Species: A. pannosana

Binomial name
- Aethes pannosana (Kennel, 1913)

Synonyms
- Phalonia pannosana Kennel, 1913

Species of moth

Aethes pannosana is a species of moth of the family Tortricidae. It was described by Kennel in 1913. It is found in Asia Minor.
