= Aethes vachelliana =

Scientific classification
- Kingdom: Animalia
- Phylum: Arthropoda
- Clade: Pancrustacea
- Class: Insecta
- Order: Lepidoptera
- Family: Tortricidae
- Genus: Aethes
- Species: A. vachelliana

Binomial name
- Aethes vachelliana (Kearfott, 1907)

Synonyms
- Phalonia vachelliana Kearfott, 1907; Phtheochroa vachelliana

Species of moth

Aethes vachelliana is a species of moth of the family Tortricidae. It is known from California, the United States.

The wingspan is 13–17.5 mm (0.51–0.69 in). The inner two-thirds of the forewings are greyish-black and the outer third is cream. The hindwings are grey.
