= Aethes jonesi =

Scientific classification
- Domain: Eukaryota
- Kingdom: Animalia
- Phylum: Arthropoda
- Class: Insecta
- Order: Lepidoptera
- Family: Tortricidae
- Genus: Aethes
- Species: A. jonesi

Binomial name
- Aethes jonesi Razowski, 1967

Species of moth

Aethes jonesi is a species of moth in the family Tortricidae. It was described by Józef Razowski in 1967. It is found in Paraná state, Brazil.
