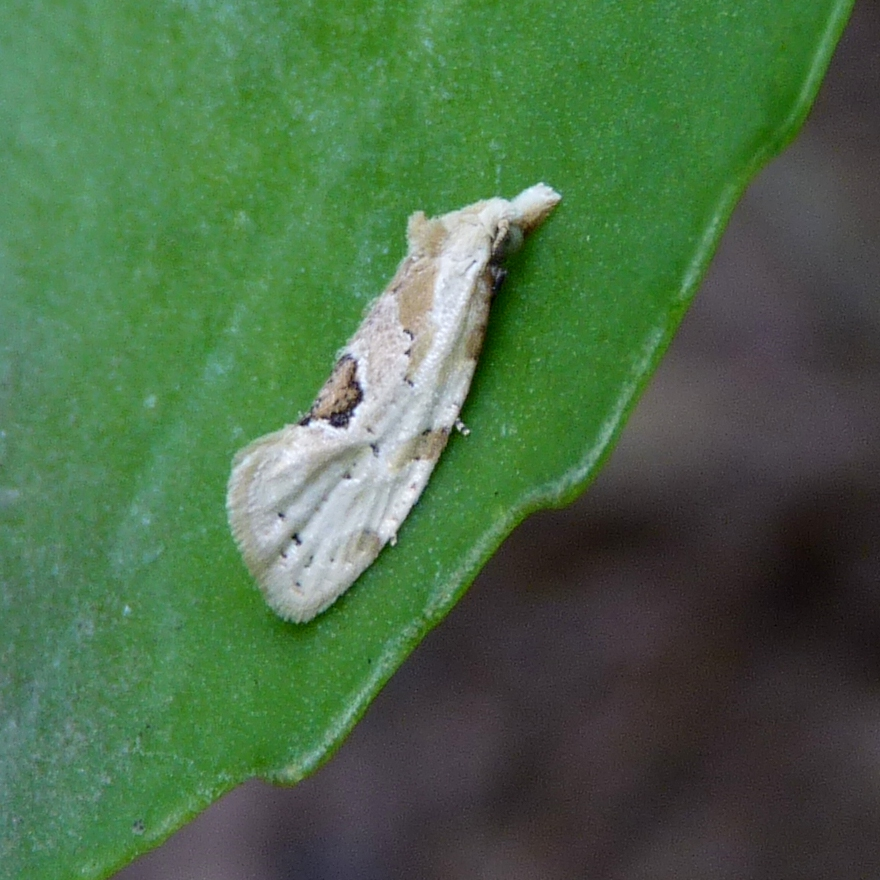

Scientific classification
- Kingdom: Animalia
- Phylum: Arthropoda
- Clade: Pancrustacea
- Class: Insecta
- Order: Lepidoptera
- Family: Tortricidae
- Genus: Aethes
- Species: A. angustana

Binomial name
- Aethes angustana (Clemens, 1860)

Synonyms
- Lozopera angustana Clemens, 1860; Phtheochroa augustana; Aethes augustana Powell, 1983; Conchylis dorsimaculana Robinson, 1869

= Aethes angustana =

Species of moth

Aethes angustana is a moth of the family Tortricidae. It was described by James Brackenridge Clemens in 1860. It is known from North America, including Massachusetts, Ontario and Pennsylvania.

The wingspan is 15–17 millimetres (0.59–0.67 in).
