= Aethes citreoflava =

Scientific classification
- Kingdom: Animalia
- Phylum: Arthropoda
- Clade: Pancrustacea
- Class: Insecta
- Order: Lepidoptera
- Family: Tortricidae
- Genus: Aethes
- Species: A. citreoflava

Binomial name
- Aethes citreoflava Kuznetzov, 1966

Species of moth

Aethes citreoflava is a species of moth of the family Tortricidae. It is found in China (Heilongjiang, Jilin), Japan, Korea, Russia (Amur, Ussuriysk) and Mongolia.
