= Aethes turialba =

Scientific classification
- Domain: Eukaryota
- Kingdom: Animalia
- Phylum: Arthropoda
- Class: Insecta
- Order: Lepidoptera
- Family: Tortricidae
- Genus: Aethes
- Species: A. turialba

Binomial name
- Aethes turialba (Busck, 1920)

Synonyms
- Hysterosia turialba Busck, 1920

Species of moth

Aethes turialba is a species of moth of the family Tortricidae. It is found in Costa Rica.
