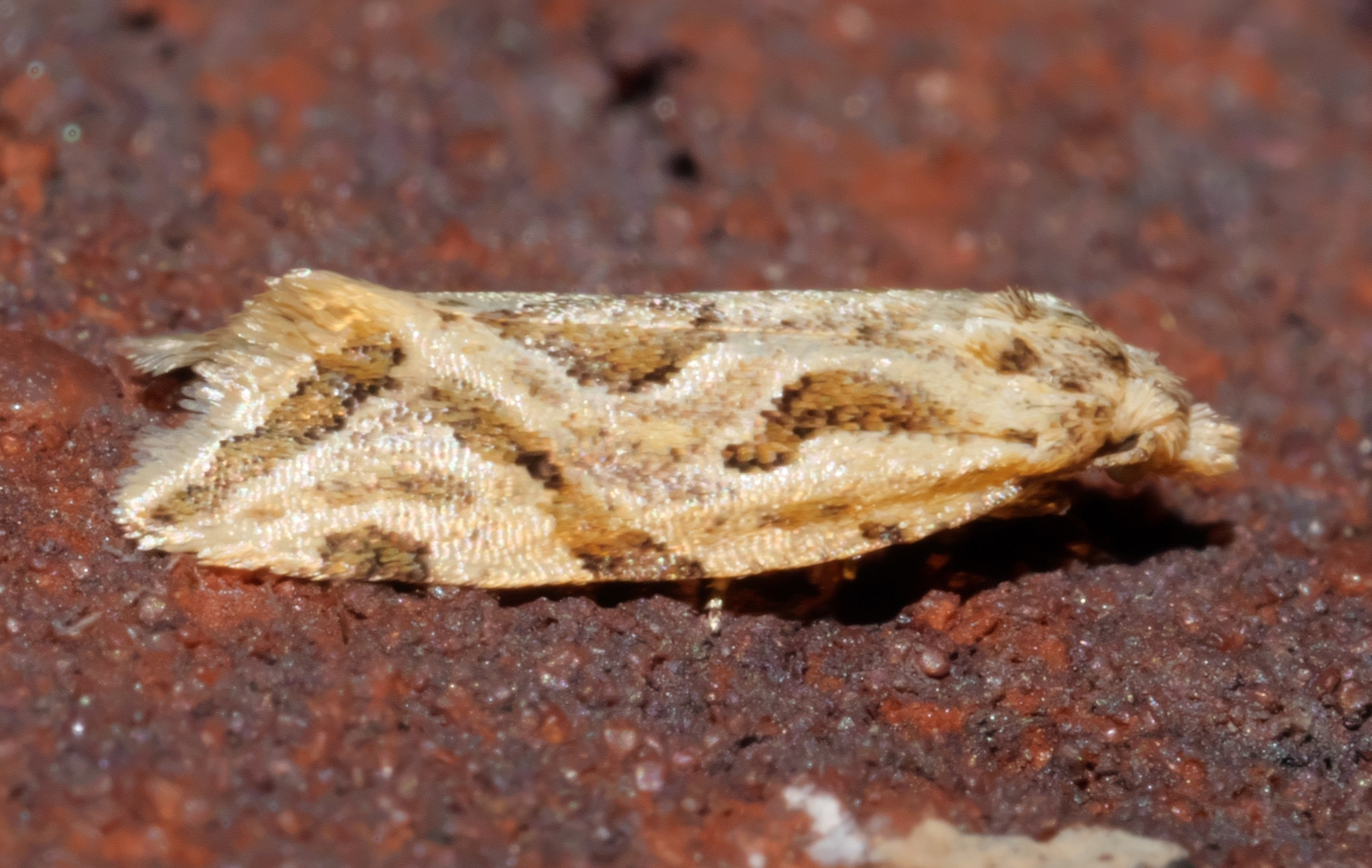
- Aethes heleniana, Oklahoma

Scientific classification
- Domain: Eukaryota
- Kingdom: Animalia
- Phylum: Arthropoda
- Class: Insecta
- Order: Lepidoptera
- Family: Tortricidae
- Genus: Aethes
- Species: A. heleniana

Binomial name
- Aethes heleniana Razowski, 1997

= Aethes heleniana =

Species of moth

Aethes heleniana is a species of moth of the family Tortricidae. It was described by Razowski in 1997. It is found in the United States, where it has been recorded east of the Rocky Mountains.

The larvae feed on Helenium autumnale.
