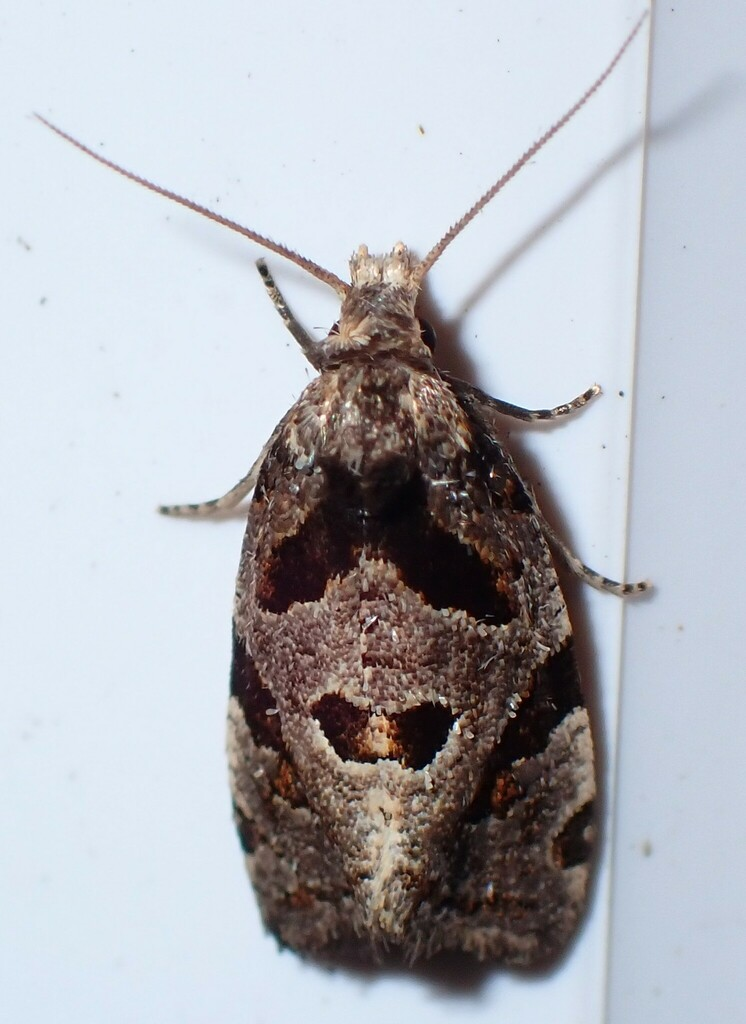

Scientific classification
- Kingdom: Animalia
- Phylum: Arthropoda
- Class: Insecta
- Order: Lepidoptera
- Family: Tortricidae
- Genus: Aethes
- Species: A. rana

Binomial name
- Aethes rana (Busck, 1907)

Synonyms
- Phalonia rana Busck, 1907; Phalonia funesta Meyrick, 1912

= Aethes rana =

Species of moth

Aethes rana is a species of moth of the family Tortricidae. It was described by August Busck in 1907. It is found in the United States, where it has been recorded from Illinois, Indiana, Kentucky, Maryland, Ohio and Pennsylvania.

The wingspan is 16–18 millimetres (0.63–0.71 in). Adults are on wing from July to September. The forewings are whitish ocherous, strongly suffused with dark fuscous and with blackish-brown markings. The hindwings are ocherous fuscous.
