= Aethes conomochla =

Scientific classification
- Domain: Eukaryota
- Kingdom: Animalia
- Phylum: Arthropoda
- Class: Insecta
- Order: Lepidoptera
- Family: Tortricidae
- Genus: Aethes
- Species: A. conomochla

Binomial name
- Aethes conomochla (Meyrick, 1933)

Synonyms
- Phalonia conomochla Meyrick, 1933

Species of moth

Aethes conomochla is a moth of the family Tortricidae. It was described by Edward Meyrick in 1933. It is only known from Kashmir (described from Gulmarg).
