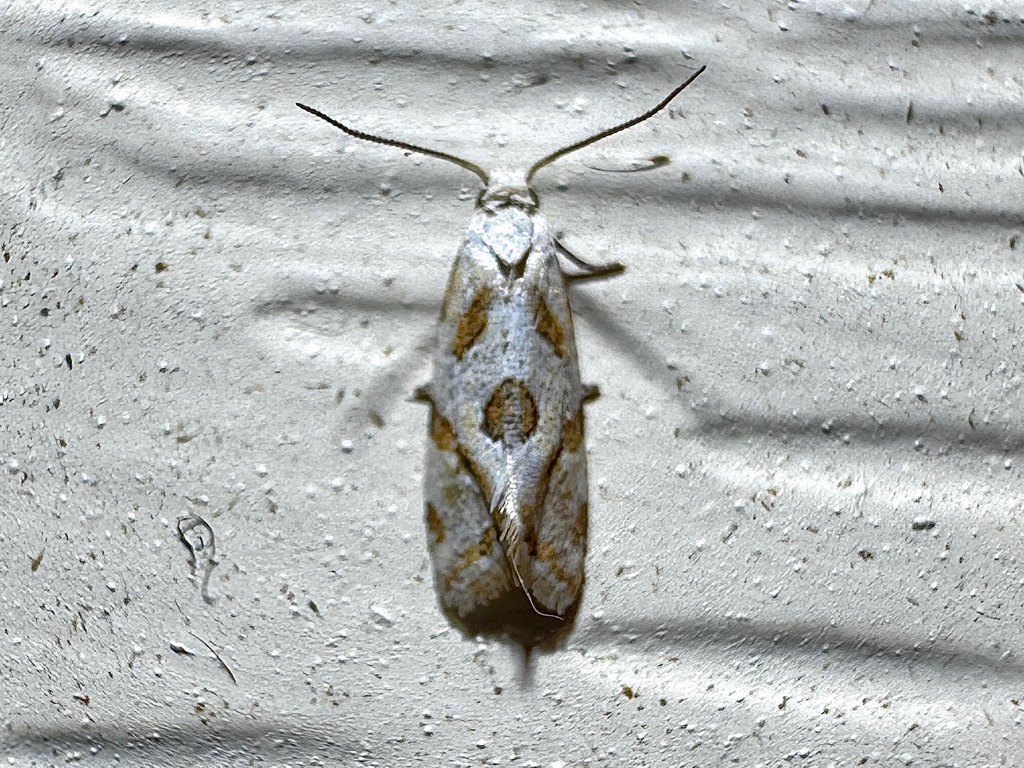

Scientific classification
- Kingdom: Animalia
- Phylum: Arthropoda
- Class: Insecta
- Order: Lepidoptera
- Family: Tortricidae
- Genus: Aethes
- Species: A. matheri

Binomial name
- Aethes matheri Sabourin & Metzler, in Sabourin, Miller, Metzler & Vargo, 2002

= Aethes matheri =

Species of moth

Aethes matheri is a species of moth of the family Tortricidae. It is found in the United States, where it has been recorded from Florida, Illinois, Indiana, Maine, Maryland, Michigan, Mississippi, Missouri, North Carolina, Pennsylvania, Tennessee and Texas.

The length of the forewings is 4.4–6.6 millimetres (0.17–0.26 in). Adults have been recorded on wing from March to November in the southern part of the range, suggesting two generations per year. In the northern part of the range, adults have been recorded in May and June, probably in one generation per year.

== Etymology ==
The species is named in honor of Bryant Mather.
