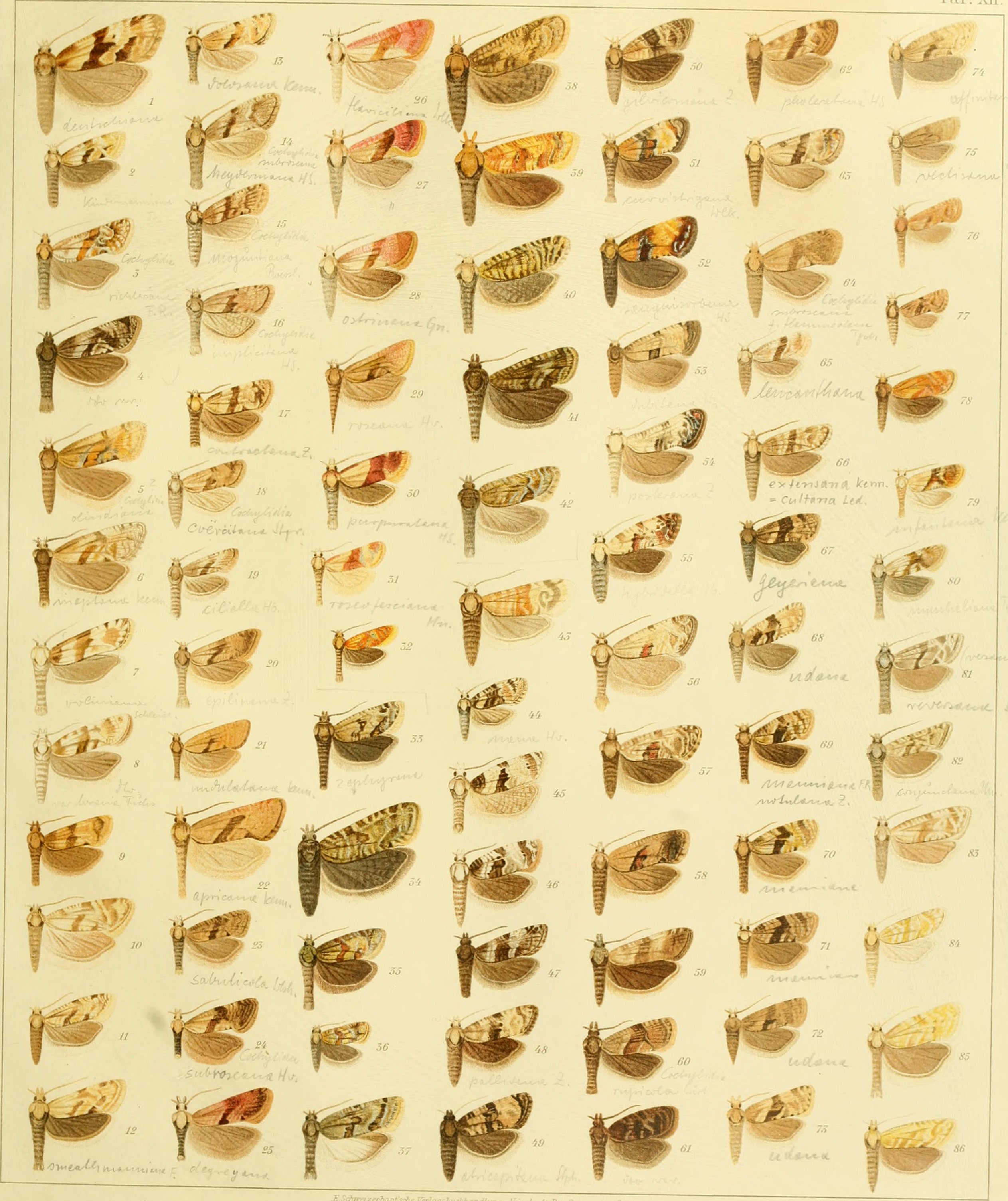
- in Kennel Die palaearktischen tortriciden figure 43, female

Scientific classification
- Domain: Eukaryota
- Kingdom: Animalia
- Phylum: Arthropoda
- Class: Insecta
- Order: Lepidoptera
- Family: Tortricidae
- Genus: Aethes
- Species: A. spirana

Binomial name
- Aethes spirana (Kennel, 1899)

Synonyms
- Cochylis spirana Kennel, 1899

= Aethes spirana =

Species of moth

Aethes spirana is a species of moth of the family Tortricidae. It was described by Kennel in 1899. It is found in Turkey and Iran.
