= Aethes pemeantensis =

Scientific classification
- Kingdom: Animalia
- Phylum: Arthropoda
- Clade: Pancrustacea
- Class: Insecta
- Order: Lepidoptera
- Family: Tortricidae
- Genus: Aethes
- Species: A. pemeantensis

Binomial name
- Aethes pemeantensis Gibeaux, 1985

Species of moth

Aethes pemeantensis is a species of moth of the family Tortricidae. It is endemic to France.

The wingspan is about 20 millimetres (0.79 in). Adults are on wing in July.
