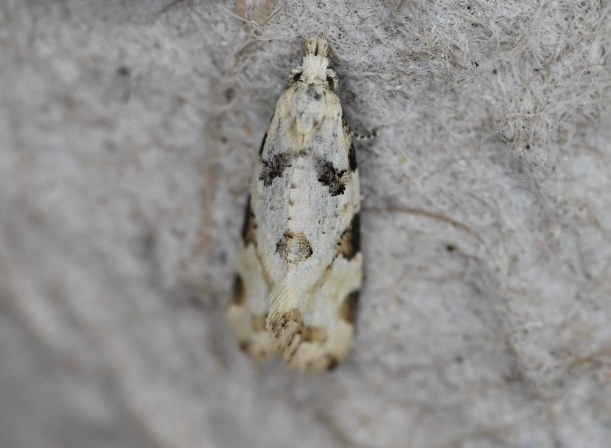

Scientific classification
- Kingdom: Animalia
- Phylum: Arthropoda
- Class: Insecta
- Order: Lepidoptera
- Family: Tortricidae
- Genus: Aethes
- Species: A. terriae

Binomial name
- Aethes terriae Sabourin & Metzler, in Sabourin, Miller, Metzler & Vargo, 2002

= Aethes terriae =

Species of moth

Aethes terriae is a species of moth of the family Tortricidae. It is found in the United States, where it has been recorded from Michigan, Indiana and Maryland.

The length of the forewings is about 5.3 millimetres (0.21 in). Adults have been recorded on wing in June and July, probably in one generation per year.

== Etymology ==
The species is named in honor of Terri Balogh.
