= Aethes ignobilis =

Scientific classification
- Domain: Eukaryota
- Kingdom: Animalia
- Phylum: Arthropoda
- Class: Insecta
- Order: Lepidoptera
- Family: Tortricidae
- Genus: Aethes
- Species: A. ignobilis

Binomial name
- Aethes ignobilis Razowski, 1994

Species of moth

Aethes ignobilis is a species of moth of the family Tortricidae. It was described by Razowski in 1994. It is found in Durango, Mexico.
