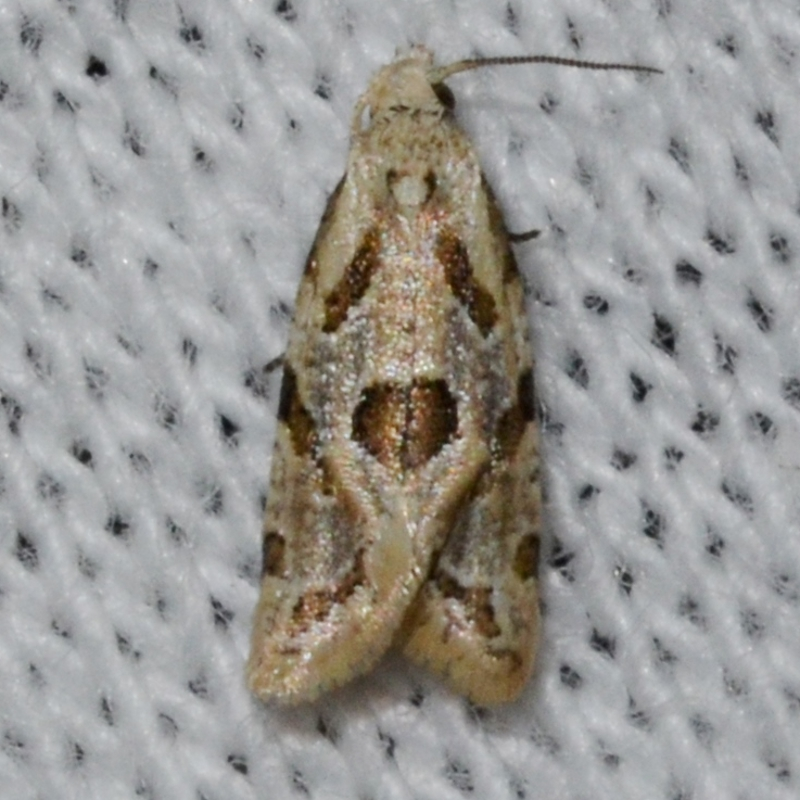

Scientific classification
- Domain: Eukaryota
- Kingdom: Animalia
- Phylum: Arthropoda
- Class: Insecta
- Order: Lepidoptera
- Family: Tortricidae
- Genus: Aethes
- Species: A. razowskii

Binomial name
- Aethes razowskii Sabourin & Metzler, in Sabourin, Miller, Metzler & Vargo, 2002

= Aethes razowskii =

Razowski's aethes moth

Species of moth

Aethes razowskii, Razowski's aethes moth, is a species of moth of the family Tortricidae. It is found in North America, where it has been recorded from Nova Scotia, Quebec, Alabama, Connecticut, Idaho, Indiana, Maine, Maryland, Michigan, New Hampshire and Vermont.

The length of the forewings is 4.7–8.6 millimetres (0.19–0.34 in). Adults have been recorded from May to September, probably in multiple generations per year.

== Etymology ==
The species is named after Józef Razowski.
