= Aethes pinara =

Scientific classification
- Kingdom: Animalia
- Phylum: Arthropoda
- Clade: Pancrustacea
- Class: Insecta
- Order: Lepidoptera
- Family: Tortricidae
- Genus: Aethes
- Species: A. pinara

Binomial name
- Aethes pinara Razowski & Becker, 2007

Species of moth

Aethes pinara is a species of moth of the family Tortricidae. It is found on Cuba.

The wingspan is about 8 mm for males and 9 mm for females.

== Etymology ==
The species name refers to Pinar Rio, the name of the type locality.
