= Aethes kandovana =

Scientific classification
- Domain: Eukaryota
- Kingdom: Animalia
- Phylum: Arthropoda
- Class: Insecta
- Order: Lepidoptera
- Family: Tortricidae
- Genus: Aethes
- Species: A. kandovana

Binomial name
- Aethes kandovana Alipanah, 2009

Species of moth

Aethes kandovana is a species of moth of the family Tortricidae. It is found in Iran.

The wingspan is about 17 mm.
