= Aethes westratei =

Scientific classification
- Domain: Eukaryota
- Kingdom: Animalia
- Phylum: Arthropoda
- Class: Insecta
- Order: Lepidoptera
- Family: Tortricidae
- Genus: Aethes
- Species: A. westratei

Binomial name
- Aethes westratei Sabourin & Miller, in Sabourin, Miller, Metzler & Vargo, 2002

Species of moth

Aethes westratei is a species of moth of the family Tortricidae. It is found in the United States, where it has been recorded from Michigan.

The length of the forewings is about 6.9 millimetres (0.27 in). Adults have been recorded on wing in September, probably in one generation per year.
