= Aethes obscurana =

Scientific classification
- Domain: Eukaryota
- Kingdom: Animalia
- Phylum: Arthropoda
- Class: Insecta
- Order: Lepidoptera
- Family: Tortricidae
- Genus: Aethes
- Species: A. obscurana

Binomial name
- Aethes obscurana (Caradja, 1916)

Synonyms
- conchylis clathrana var. obscurana Caradja, 1916; Euxanthis lucindana Kennel, 1919

Species of moth

Aethes obscurana is a species of moth of the family Tortricidae. It was described by Aristide Caradja in 1916. It is found in the European part of Russia and Central Asia (Juldus, Alai, Zailijskij Ala Tau, Dshungarskij Ala Tau).
