= Aethes acerba =

Scientific classification
- Kingdom: Animalia
- Phylum: Arthropoda
- Class: Insecta
- Order: Lepidoptera
- Family: Tortricidae
- Genus: Aethes
- Species: A. acerba

Binomial name
- Aethes acerba Y.H. Sun & H.H. Li, 2013

Species of moth

Aethes acerba is a species of moth of the family Tortricidae. It is found in Henan, China.

The wingspan is 13.5−14 mm.
