= Aethes scalana =

Scientific classification
- Kingdom: Animalia
- Phylum: Arthropoda
- Class: Insecta
- Order: Lepidoptera
- Family: Tortricidae
- Genus: Aethes
- Species: A. scalana

Binomial name
- Aethes scalana (Zerny, 1927)

Synonyms
- Phalonia scalana Zerny, 1927; Aethes pacata Falkovitsh, 1963

Species of moth

Aethes scalana is a species of moth of the family Tortricidae. It was described by Zerny in 1927. It is found in Spain, Italy, Ukraine, Russia, Algeria, the Caucasus, Tajikistan, Kazakhstan and Iran.

The wingspan is 12–15 millimetres (0.47–0.59 in). Adults are on wing from August to September.
