= Aethes atlasi =

Scientific classification
- Domain: Eukaryota
- Kingdom: Animalia
- Phylum: Arthropoda
- Class: Insecta
- Order: Lepidoptera
- Family: Tortricidae
- Genus: Aethes
- Species: A. atlasi

Binomial name
- Aethes atlasi (Razowski, 1962)

Synonyms
- Aethes flagellana atlasi Razowski, 1962

Species of moth

Aethes atlasi is a species of moth of the family Tortricidae. It was described by Razowski in 1962. It is found from Spain to Greece and in the southern Ural Mountains, Kazakhstan, Turkmenistan, Asia Minor, Iran, Lebanon and Morocco.
