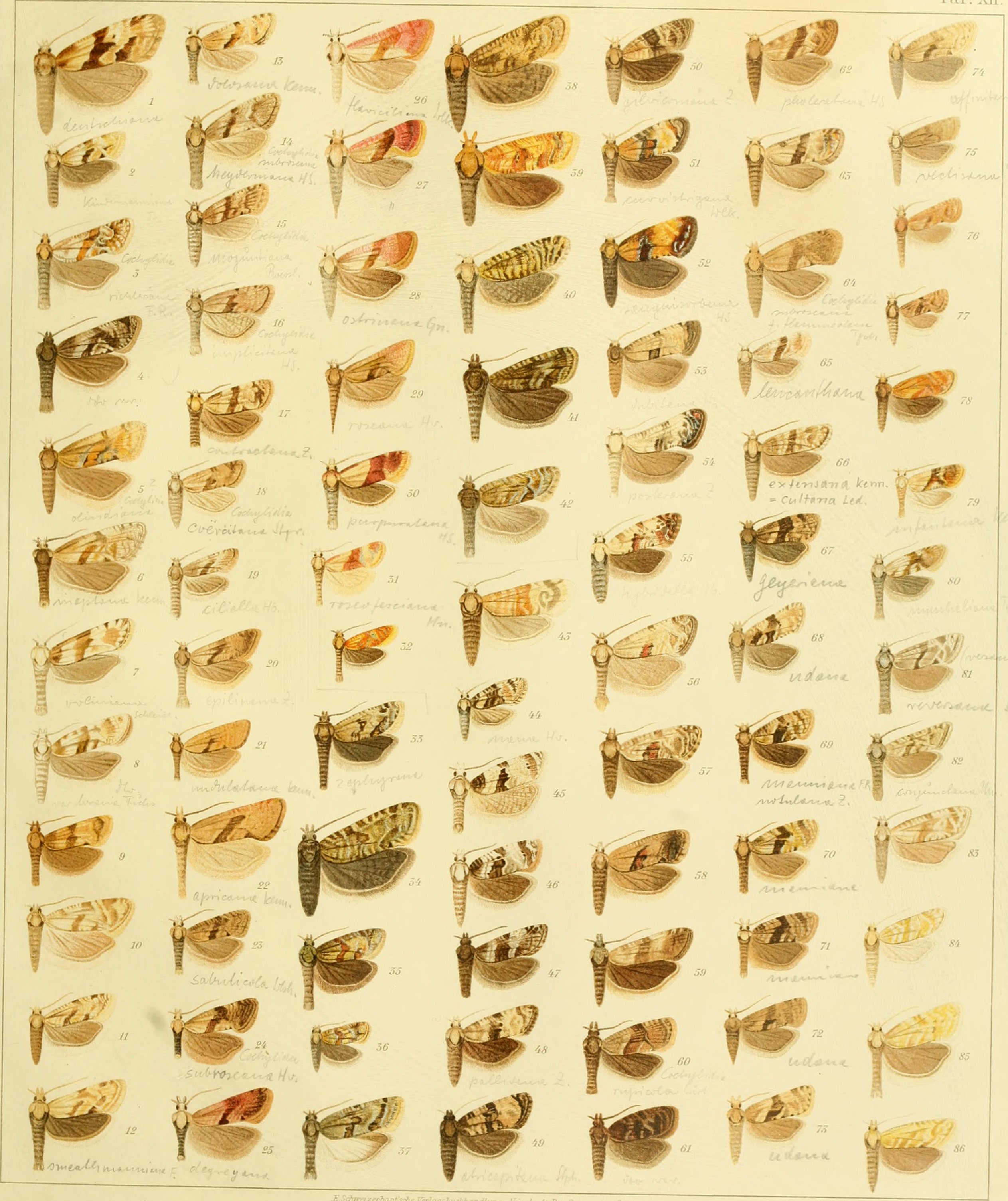
- in Kennel Die palaearktischen tortriciden figure 32, male

Scientific classification
- Domain: Eukaryota
- Kingdom: Animalia
- Phylum: Arthropoda
- Class: Insecta
- Order: Lepidoptera
- Family: Tortricidae
- Genus: Aethes
- Species: A. cremonana

Binomial name
- Aethes cremonana (Ragonot, 1894)

Synonyms
- Conchylis cremonana Ragonot, 1894

= Aethes cremonana =

Species of moth

Aethes cremonana is a species of moth of the family Tortricidae. It is found in Asia Minor, Lebanon, Syria and Iran.
