= Aethes grandaeva =

Scientific classification
- Kingdom: Animalia
- Phylum: Arthropoda
- Clade: Pancrustacea
- Class: Insecta
- Order: Lepidoptera
- Family: Tortricidae
- Genus: Aethes
- Species: A. grandaeva

Binomial name
- Aethes grandaeva Razowski & Becker, 1983

Species of moth

Aethes grandaeva is a species of moth of the family Tortricidae. It was described by Razowski and Becker in 1983. It is found in Paraná, Brazil.
