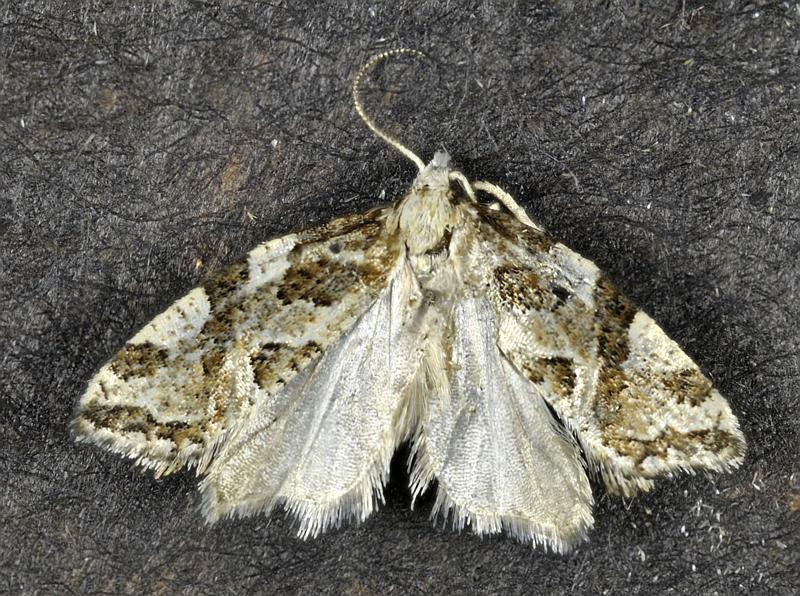

Scientific classification
- Domain: Eukaryota
- Kingdom: Animalia
- Phylum: Arthropoda
- Class: Insecta
- Order: Lepidoptera
- Family: Tortricidae
- Genus: Aethes
- Species: A. sexdentata

Binomial name
- Aethes sexdentata Sabourin & Miller, in Sabourin, Miller, Metzler & Vargo, 2002

= Aethes sexdentata =

Species of moth

Aethes sexdentata is a species of moth of the family Tortricidae. It is found in North America, where it has been recorded from Nova Scotia, Ontario, Quebec, Connecticut, Illinois, Indiana, Maine, Massachusetts, Michigan, Minnesota, Mississippi, Nebraska, New Jersey, Pennsylvania, Vermont, Washington, West Virginia and Wisconsin. The habitat consists of deciduous forest openings and blueberry thickets.

The length of the forewings is 5.7–8.2 millimetres (0.22–0.32 in). Adults have been recorded on wing from May to August, probably in one generation per year.

The larvae feed on Solidago species.

== Etymology ==
The species name refers to the spines on the harpe.
