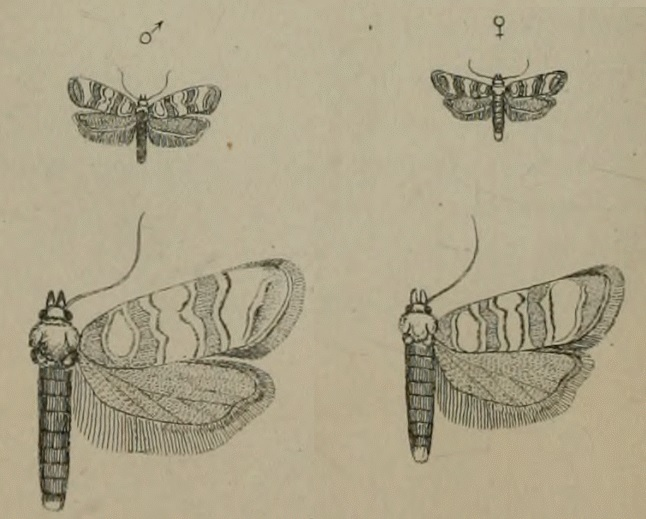
- Male and female

Scientific classification
- Domain: Eukaryota
- Kingdom: Animalia
- Phylum: Arthropoda
- Class: Insecta
- Order: Lepidoptera
- Family: Tortricidae
- Genus: Aethes
- Species: A. aurofasciana

Binomial name
- Aethes aurofasciana (Mann, 1855)

Synonyms
- Tortrix aurofasciana Mann, 1855; Cochylis valdensiana Herrich-Schaffer, 1856

= Aethes aurofasciana =

Species of moth

Aethes aurofasciana is a species of moth of the family Tortricidae. It is found in Austria, Switzerland, Germany, Italy, Slovakia, Slovenia and Poland.

The wingspan is 13–15 mm. Adults are on wing from June to August.

The larvae feed on Gentiana clusii.
