= Aethes alatavica =

Scientific classification
- Domain: Eukaryota
- Kingdom: Animalia
- Phylum: Arthropoda
- Class: Insecta
- Order: Lepidoptera
- Family: Tortricidae
- Genus: Aethes
- Species: A. alatavica

Binomial name
- Aethes alatavica (Danilevsky, in Danilevsky, Kuznetsov & Falkovitsh, 1962)

Synonyms
- Phalonia alatavica Danilevsky, 1962

Species of moth

Aethes alatavica is a species of moth of the family Tortricidae. It is found in Central Asia, Russia, Mongolia and China (Beijing, Inner Mongolia, Ningxia, Qinghai, Shaanxi, Shanxi, Xinjiang).
