= Aethes chilesi =

Scientific classification
- Kingdom: Animalia
- Phylum: Arthropoda
- Clade: Pancrustacea
- Class: Insecta
- Order: Lepidoptera
- Family: Tortricidae
- Genus: Aethes
- Species: A. chilesi

Binomial name
- Aethes chilesi Razowski & Wojtusiak, 2008

Species of moth

Aethes chilesi is a species of moth of the family Tortricidae. It was named by Józef Razowski and Janusz Wojtusiak in 2008. It is found in Carchi Province, Ecuador, and Cauca Department, Colombia. It is known from elevations of 1,500–2,050 m (4,920–6,730 ft).

The wingspan is about 27 millimetres (1.1 in).

== Etymology ==
The species name refers to Volcan Chiles, the type locality.
