= Aethes furvescens =

Scientific classification
- Kingdom: Animalia
- Phylum: Arthropoda
- Class: Insecta
- Order: Lepidoptera
- Family: Tortricidae
- Genus: Aethes
- Species: A. furvescens

Binomial name
- Aethes furvescens Bai Guo & Guo, 1996

Species of moth

Aethes furvescens is a species of moth of the family Tortricidae. It is found in Shanxi, China.
