= Aethes obliquana =

Scientific classification
- Domain: Eukaryota
- Kingdom: Animalia
- Phylum: Arthropoda
- Class: Insecta
- Order: Lepidoptera
- Family: Tortricidae
- Genus: Aethes
- Species: A. obliquana

Binomial name
- Aethes obliquana (Kearfott, 1907)

Synonyms
- Phalonia obliquana Kearfott, 1907; Aethes obliquna Razowski, 2000

Species of moth

Aethes obliquana is a species of moth of the family Tortricidae. It is found in the United States, where it has been recorded from North Carolina, Kentucky and Ohio.

The wingspan is 20–22 millimetres (0.79–0.87 in). The forewings are clay yellow, with rich cinnamon brown spots and lines. The hindwings are shining cinereous (ash gray), darker at the apex and on outer ends of the veins. Adults have been recorded on wing between June and October.
