= Aethes luteopictana =

Scientific classification
- Kingdom: Animalia
- Phylum: Arthropoda
- Clade: Pancrustacea
- Class: Insecta
- Order: Lepidoptera
- Family: Tortricidae
- Genus: Aethes
- Species: A. luteopictana

Binomial name
- Aethes luteopictana (Kennel, 1900)

Synonyms
- Conchylis luteopictana Kennel, 1900; Phalonia luteopictana

Species of moth

Aethes luteopictana is a species of moth of the family Tortricidae. It was described by Julius von Kennel in 1900. It is found in north-eastern Iran.
