= Aethes amurensis =

Scientific classification
- Kingdom: Animalia
- Phylum: Arthropoda
- Class: Insecta
- Order: Lepidoptera
- Family: Tortricidae
- Genus: Aethes
- Species: A. amurensis

Binomial name
- Aethes amurensis Razowski, 1964

Synonyms
- Aethes amurensi

Species of moth

Aethes amurensis is a species of moth of the family Tortricidae. It is found in Russia (Amur Oblast), China (Beijing, Gansu, Guizhou, Hebei, Heilongjiang, Henan, Jilin, Liaoning, Ningxia, Qinghai, Shaanxi, and Shanxi), and Korea.
