= Aethes afghana =

Scientific classification
- Domain: Eukaryota
- Kingdom: Animalia
- Phylum: Arthropoda
- Class: Insecta
- Order: Lepidoptera
- Family: Tortricidae
- Genus: Aethes
- Species: A. afghana

Binomial name
- Aethes afghana Razowski, 1983

Species of moth

Aethes afghana is a moth of the family Tortricidae. It was first described from Afghanistan where it is probably widely distributed. It is known from the vicinity of Kabul, Safed Koh and Paghman Mountains. Specimens were collected at altitudes of 2,200 to 2,650 meters. It has also been recorded from Kashmir.
