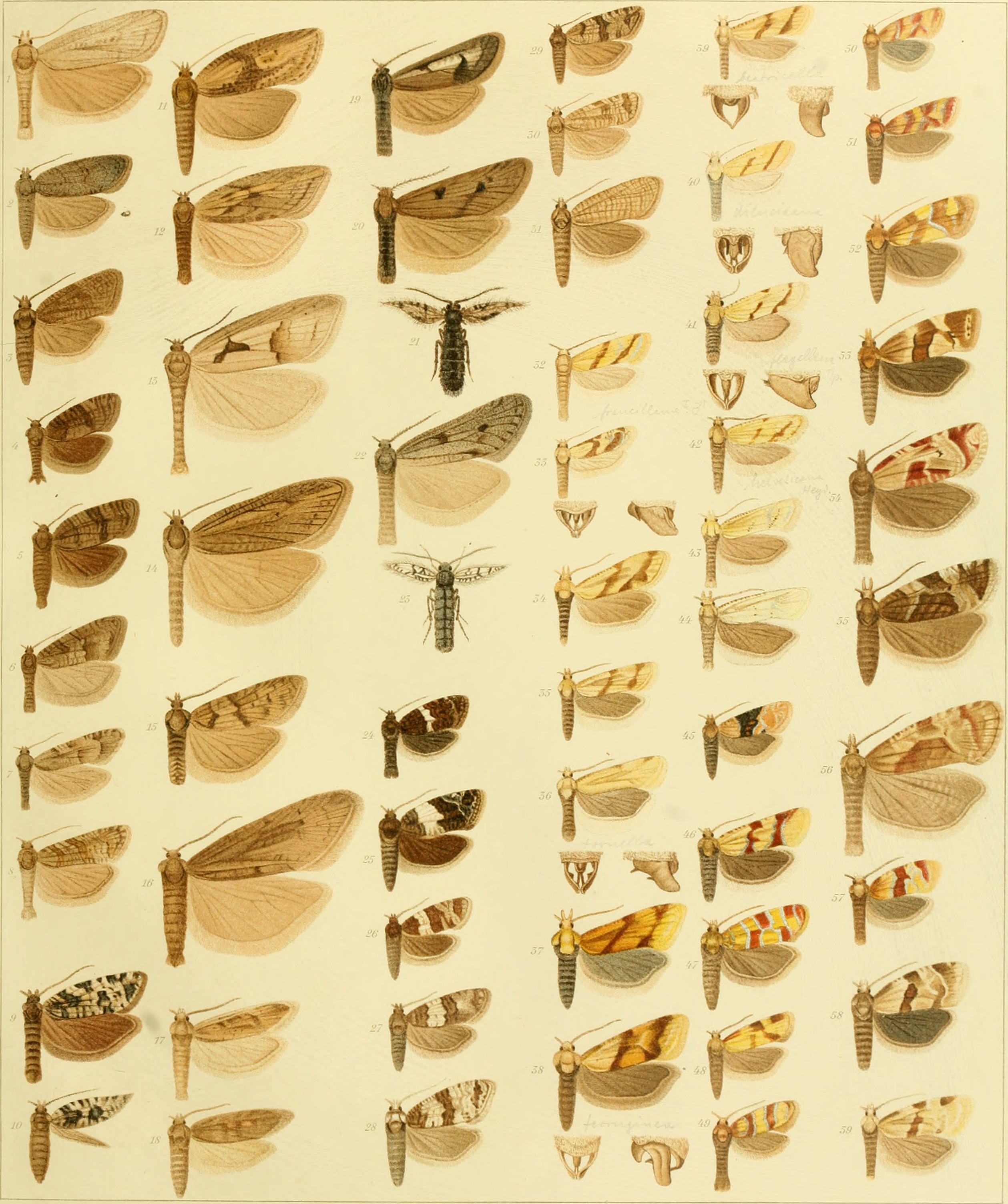
- Aethes vicinana in Die palaearktischen tortriciden (figure 43)

Scientific classification
- Domain: Eukaryota
- Kingdom: Animalia
- Phylum: Arthropoda
- Class: Insecta
- Order: Lepidoptera
- Family: Tortricidae
- Genus: Aethes
- Species: A. vicinana

Binomial name
- Aethes vicinana (J. J. Mann, 1859)

Synonyms
- Cochylis vicinana J. J. Mann, 1859; Euxanthis durantana D. Lucas, 1942; Aethes durantana Razowski, 1970; Conchylis unicolor Bethune-Baker, 1885

= Aethes vicinana =

Species of moth

Aethes vicinana is a species of moth of the family Tortricidae. It was described by Josef Johann Mann in 1859. It is found on Sicily and in Morocco, Tunisia and Algeria.
