= Aethes amseli =

Scientific classification
- Domain: Eukaryota
- Kingdom: Animalia
- Phylum: Arthropoda
- Class: Insecta
- Order: Lepidoptera
- Family: Tortricidae
- Genus: Aethes
- Species: A. amseli

Binomial name
- Aethes amseli Razowski, 1967

Species of moth

Aethes amseli is a species of moth of the family Tortricidae. It was described by Razowski in 1967. It is endemic to Afghanistan.
