= Neoeulia =

Scientific classification
- Kingdom: Animalia
- Phylum: Arthropoda
- Clade: Pancrustacea
- Class: Insecta
- Order: Lepidoptera
- Family: Tortricidae
- Tribe: Euliini
- Genus: Neoeulia; Powell, 1986

Genus of tortrix moths

Neoeulia is a genus of moths belonging to the family Tortricidae.

== Species ==
- Neoeulia dorsistriatana (Walsingham, 1884)

== See also ==
- List of Tortricidae genera
