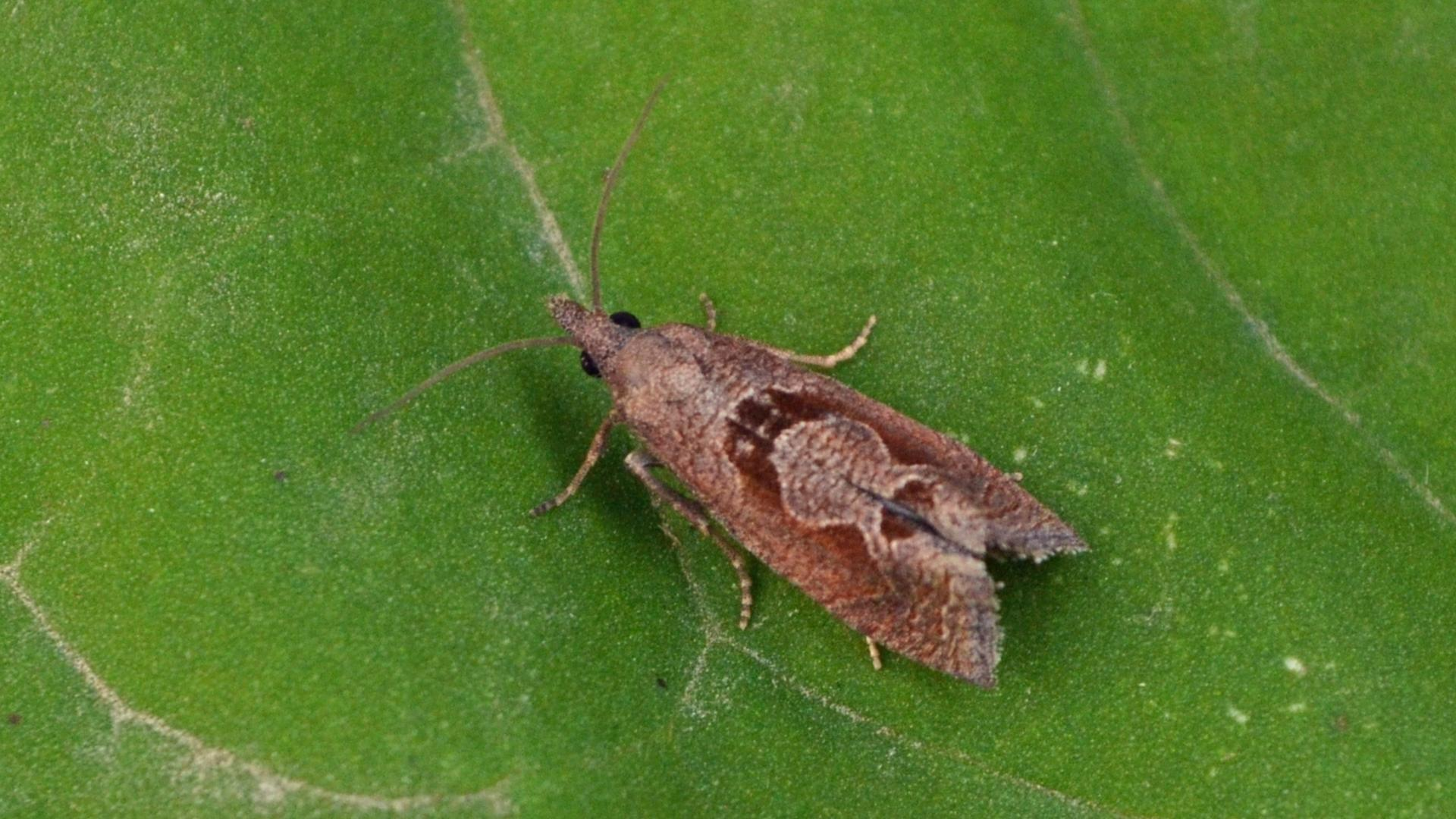

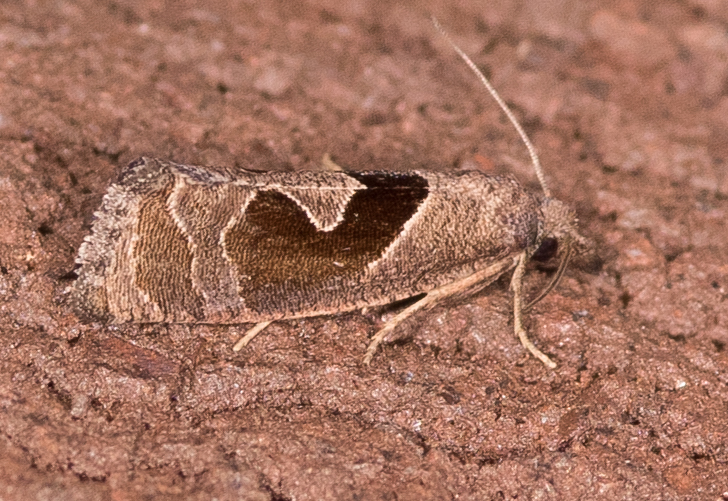

Scientific classification
- Kingdom: Animalia
- Phylum: Arthropoda
- Clade: Pancrustacea
- Class: Insecta
- Order: Lepidoptera
- Family: Tortricidae
- Genus: Eucosma
- Species: E. similiana

Binomial name
- Eucosma similiana (Clemens, 1860)

Synonyms
- Poecilochroma similiana Clemens, 1860; Pelochrista similiana; Eucosma dorsisignatana var. confluana Kearfott, 1905; Eucosma engelana Kearfott, 1908; Paedisca similana Fernald, 1882

= Eucosma similiana =

Species of moth

Eucosma similiana is a species of moth of the family Tortricidae. It is found in North America, where it has been recorded from the north-eastern United States and south-eastern Canada. The habitat consists of fields and waste areas.

The length of the forewings is 8.1–11 mm for males and 8.2–10.3 mm for females. Adults are on wing from July to September.

The larvae feed on Solidago species. They feed in the rootstalks of their host plant.

== Taxonomy ==
The species was formerly listed as a subspecies of Eucosma dorsisignatana.
