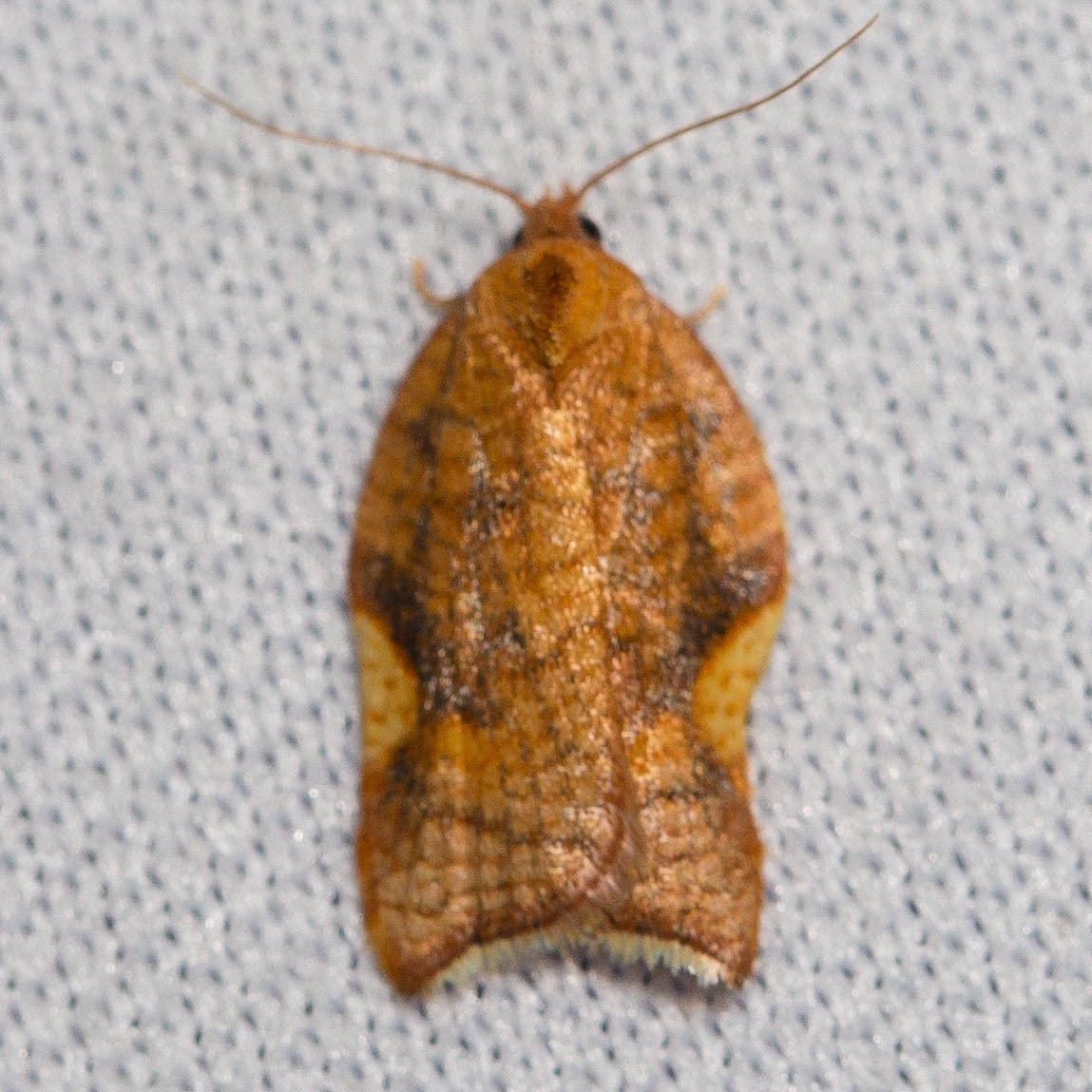

Scientific classification
- Domain: Eukaryota
- Kingdom: Animalia
- Phylum: Arthropoda
- Class: Insecta
- Order: Lepidoptera
- Family: Tortricidae
- Genus: Acleris
- Species: A. foliana

Binomial name
- Acleris foliana (Walsingham, 1879)

Synonyms
- Teras foliana Walsingham, 1879

= Acleris foliana =

Species of moth

Acleris foliana is a species of moth in the family Tortricidae. It is found in North America, where it has been recorded from Arizona, California, Colorado, Utah and Wyoming.

The wingspan is 16–18 mm. Adults have been recorded on wing from May to August.

The larvae feed on Cercocarpus betuloides, Cercocarpus ledifolius and Cercocarpus montanus.
