= Acleris fragariana =

Scientific classification
- Domain: Eukaryota
- Kingdom: Animalia
- Phylum: Arthropoda
- Class: Insecta
- Order: Lepidoptera
- Family: Tortricidae
- Genus: Acleris
- Species: A. fragariana

Binomial name
- Acleris fragariana Kearfott, 1904

Synonyms
- Peronea fragariana

Species of moth

Acleris fragariana is a species of moth of the family Tortricidae. It is found in North America, where it has been recorded from Alberta, California, Maine, Minnesota, New Hampshire, New York, Ontario and Washington.

The wingspan is 15–16 mm. Adults have been recorded on wing from July to October.

The larvae feed on Myrica gale, Aronia melanocarpa, Fragaria (including Fragaria virginiana), Prunus, Rosa, Rubus and Pouteria species.
