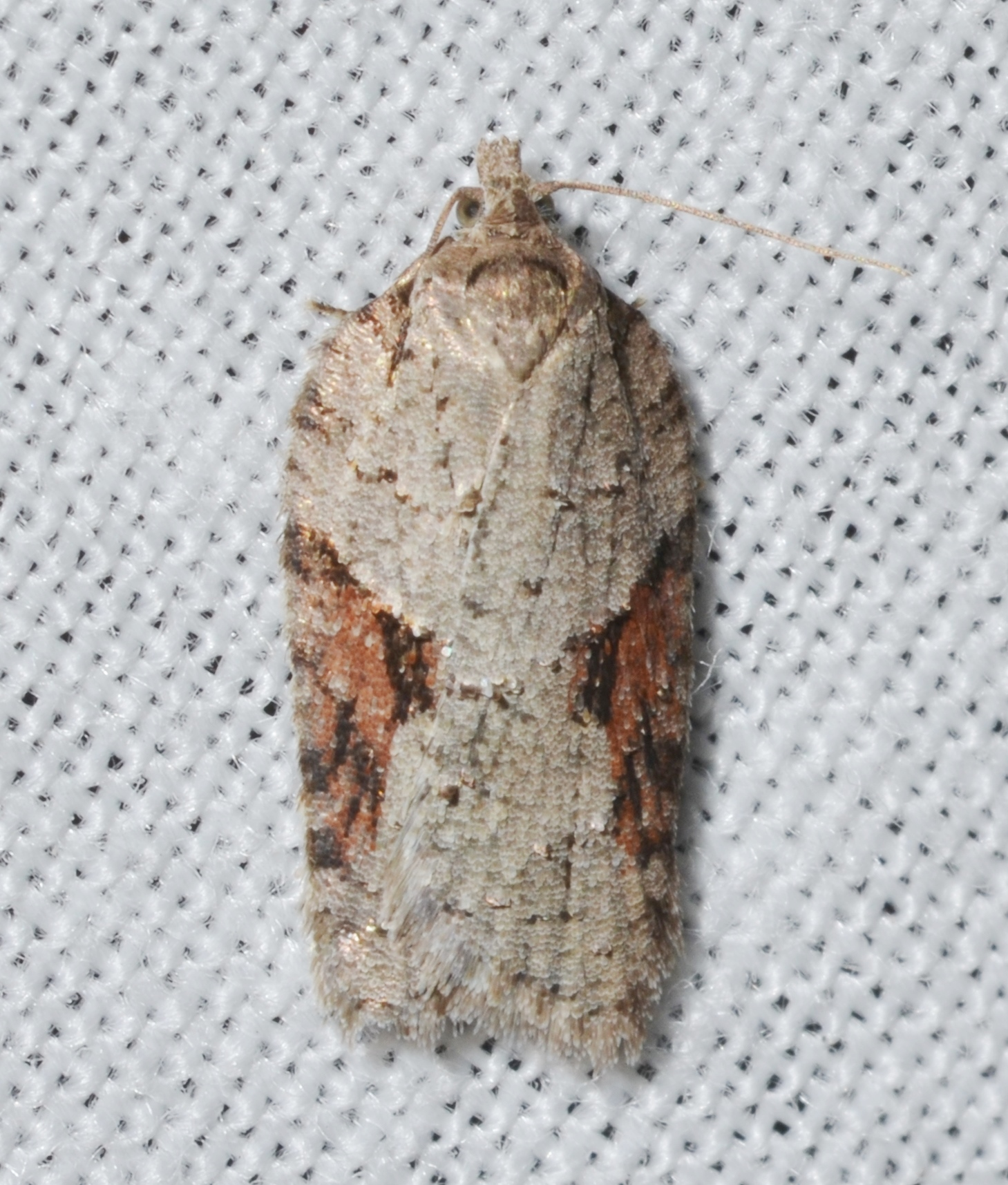

Scientific classification
- Kingdom: Animalia
- Phylum: Arthropoda
- Clade: Pancrustacea
- Class: Insecta
- Order: Lepidoptera
- Family: Tortricidae
- Genus: Acleris
- Species: A. ptychogrammos

Binomial name
- Acleris ptychogrammos (Zeller, 1875)

Synonyms
- Teras hastiana var. ptychogrammos Zeller, 1875; Peronea ptychogrammos

= Acleris ptychogrammos =

Species of moth

Acleris ptychogrammos is a species of moth of the family Tortricidae. It is found in North America, where it has been recorded from Alabama, British Columbia, Illinois, Indiana, Kentucky, Maine, Manitoba, Maryland, Massachusetts, Michigan, Mississippi, New Hampshire, New York, North Carolina, Ohio, Oklahoma, Ontario, West Virginia and Wisconsin.

The wingspan is about 15 mm. Adults have been recorded on wing nearly year round in the south.

The larvae feed on Cornus sericea.
