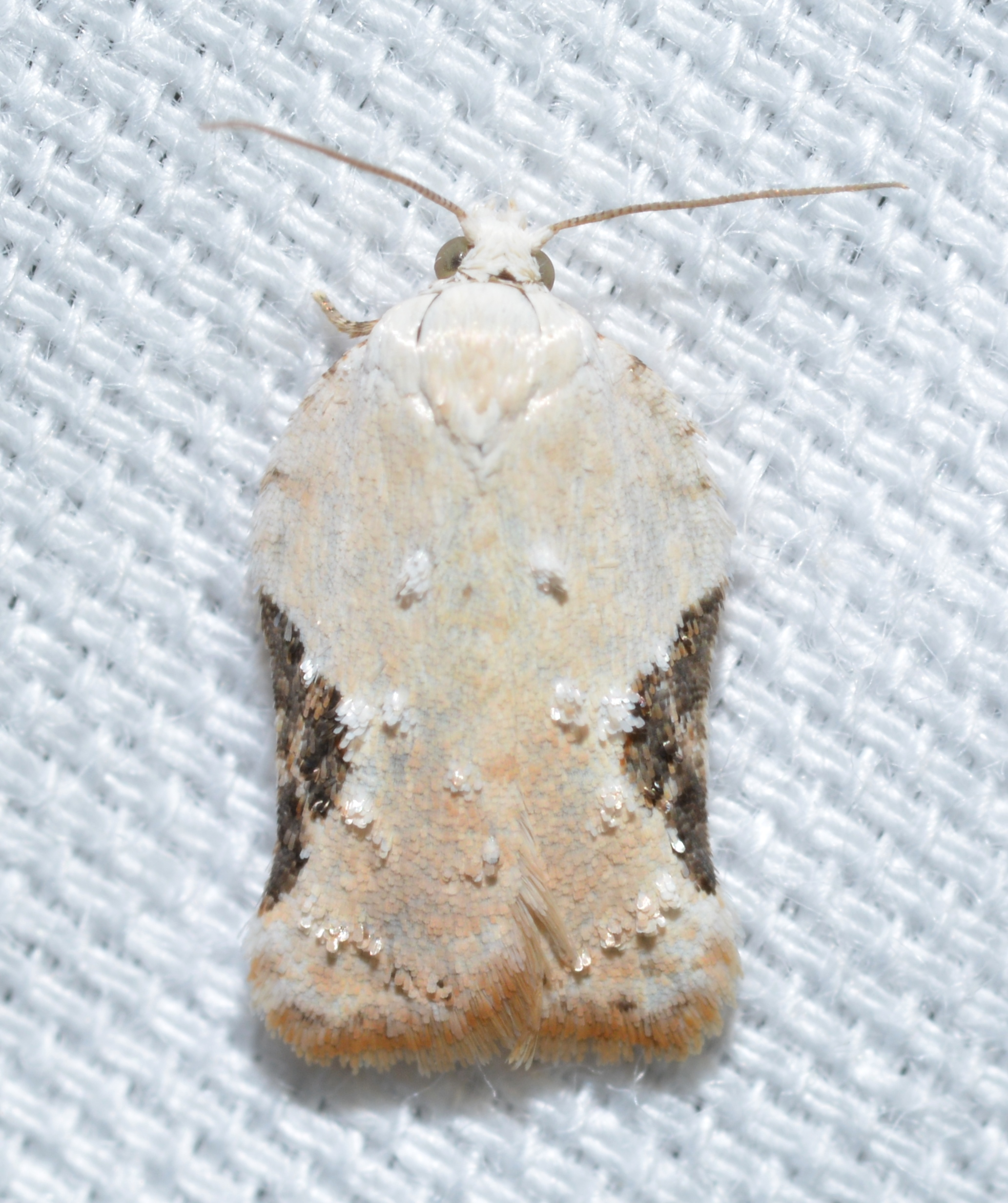

Scientific classification
- Kingdom: Animalia
- Phylum: Arthropoda
- Class: Insecta
- Order: Lepidoptera
- Family: Tortricidae
- Genus: Acleris
- Species: A. subnivana

Binomial name
- Acleris subnivana (Walker, 1863)

Synonyms
- Penthina subnivana Walker, 1863; Peronea subnivana; Teras deflectana Robinson, 1869; Teras peculiana Zeller, 1875

= Acleris subnivana =

Species of moth

Acleris subnivana, the common acleris, is a species of moth of the family Tortricidae. It is found in North America, where it has been recorded from Arkansas, Illinois, Indiana, Kentucky, Maine, Maryland, Massachusetts, Michigan, Mississippi, New Brunswick, New Hampshire, New York, North Carolina, Ohio, Oklahoma, Ontario, Pennsylvania, Quebec, South Carolina, Tennessee, West Virginia and Wisconsin.

The wingspan is 15–16 mm. Adults have been recorded on wing year round.

The larvae feed on Vernonia and Quercus species (including Quercus rubra).
