= Acleris flavivittana =

Multiform leafroller moth

Scientific classification
- Kingdom: Animalia
- Phylum: Arthropoda
- Clade: Pancrustacea
- Class: Insecta
- Order: Lepidoptera
- Family: Tortricidae
- Genus: Acleris
- Species: A. flavivittana

Binomial name
- Acleris flavivittana (Clemens, 1864)

Synonyms
- Peronea flavivittana Clemens, 1864; Teras perspicuana Robinson, 1869

Species of moth

Acleris flavivittana, the multiform leafroller moth, is a species of moth of the family Tortricidae. It is found in North America, where it has been recorded from Georgia, Illinois, Indiana, Kentucky, Maine, Maryland, Massachusetts, Michigan, New Brunswick, New Hampshire, New Jersey, New York, North Carolina, Ohio, Ontario, Pennsylvania, Quebec, Tennessee, Vermont, Virginia, Washington, West Virginia and Wisconsin.

The wingspan is 18–19 mm. Adults have been recorded on wing year round.

The larvae feed on Malus pumila and Prunus pensylvanica.
