= Acleris cornana =

Scientific classification
- Domain: Eukaryota
- Kingdom: Animalia
- Phylum: Arthropoda
- Class: Insecta
- Order: Lepidoptera
- Family: Tortricidae
- Genus: Acleris
- Species: A. cornana

Binomial name
- Acleris cornana (McDunnough, 1933)

Synonyms
- Peronea cornana McDunnough, 1933

Species of moth

Acleris cornana is a species of moth of the family Tortricidae. It is found in North America, where it has been recorded from Alberta, British Columbia, Illinois, Indiana, Kentucky, Maine, Manitoba, Maryland, Michigan, Minnesota, New Brunswick, New York, North Carolina, Ohio, Ontario, Quebec, Vermont, Washington and Wisconsin.

The wingspan is 14–16 mm. The forewings are uniform olive grey. Adults have been recorded on wing from March to November.

The larvae feed on Alnus incana and Cornus species (including Cornus canadensis, Cornus racemosa and Cornus sericea).
