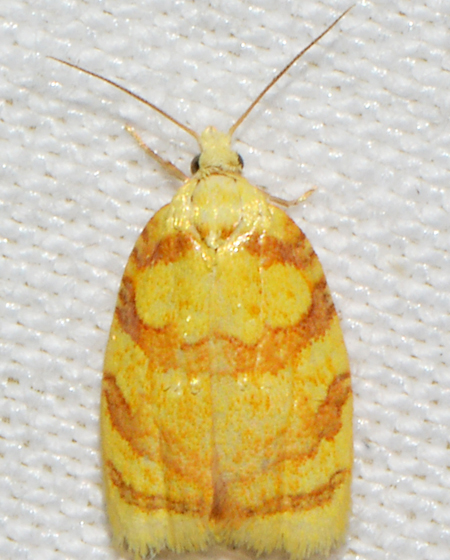

Scientific classification
- Kingdom: Animalia
- Phylum: Arthropoda
- Clade: Pancrustacea
- Class: Insecta
- Order: Lepidoptera
- Family: Tortricidae
- Genus: Acleris
- Species: A. albicomana

Binomial name
- Acleris albicomana (Clemens, 1865)

Synonyms
- Xanthosetia albicomana Clemens, 1865; Croesia albicomana

= Acleris albicomana =

Species of moth

Acleris albicomana, the red-edged acleris moth, is a species of moth of the family Tortricidae. It is found in North America, where it has been recorded from Alberta, Arizona, British Columbia, California, Colorado, Florida, Illinois, Indiana, Iowa, Kentucky, Maine, Manitoba, Maryland, Minnesota, Montana, New Mexico, New York, North Carolina, Ohio, Ontario, Oregon, Pennsylvania, Saskatchewan, Tennessee, Virginia and Utah.

The wingspan is 12–14 mm. Adults have been recorded on wing from April to September.

The larvae feed on Gaylussacia, Vaccinium and Quercus species, as well as Rosa californica and Rosa gymnocarpa.
