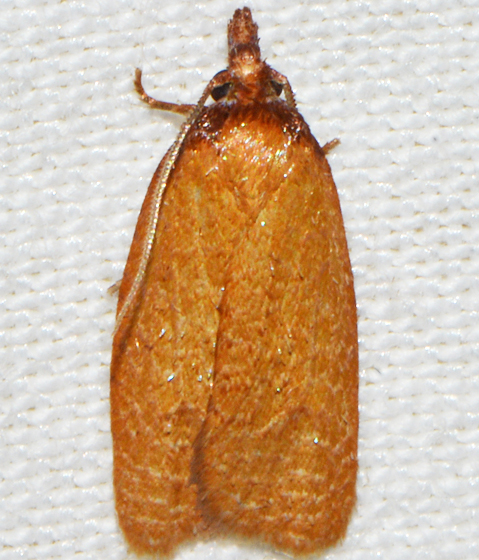

Scientific classification
- Domain: Eukaryota
- Kingdom: Animalia
- Phylum: Arthropoda
- Class: Insecta
- Order: Lepidoptera
- Family: Tortricidae
- Genus: Sparganothis
- Species: S. distincta

Binomial name
- Sparganothis distincta (Walsingham, 1884)

Synonyms
- Oenectra distincta Walsingham, 1884; Sparganothis putmanana Freeman, 1940; Sparganothis solidana Freeman, 1941; Sparganothis salinana McDunnough, 1961

= Sparganothis distincta =

Species of moth

Sparganothis distincta, the distinct sparganothis moth, is a species of moth of the family Tortricidae. It is found in North America from Kansas and Ohio northeast to Maine and New Brunswick, south to Florida and west to Texas, Arizona and Utah.

The wingspan is 22–23 mm.

The larvae are leaf tiers of Solidago species.
