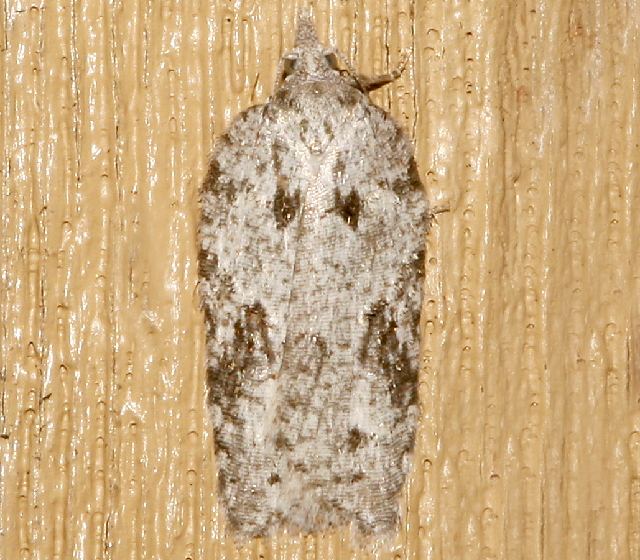

Scientific classification
- Domain: Eukaryota
- Kingdom: Animalia
- Phylum: Arthropoda
- Class: Insecta
- Order: Lepidoptera
- Family: Tortricidae
- Genus: Acleris
- Species: A. maximana

Binomial name
- Acleris maximana (Barnes & Busck, 1920)

Synonyms
- Peronea maximana Barnes & Busck, 1920; Peronea maxima Frost, 1926

= Acleris maximana =

Species of moth

Acleris maximana is a species of moth of the family Tortricidae first described by William Barnes and August Busck in 1920. It is found in North America, where it has been recorded from Alberta, British Columbia, California, Maryland, Massachusetts, Michigan, Montana, New Brunswick, North Carolina, Ontario, Pennsylvania, Saskatchewan, Tennessee, Utah and Washington.

The wingspan is 21–28 mm. Adults have been recorded on wing nearly year round.

The larvae feed on Prunus emarginata, Salix, Malus (including Malus pumila) and Populus species (including Populus balsamifera, Populus tremula and Populus tremuloides).
