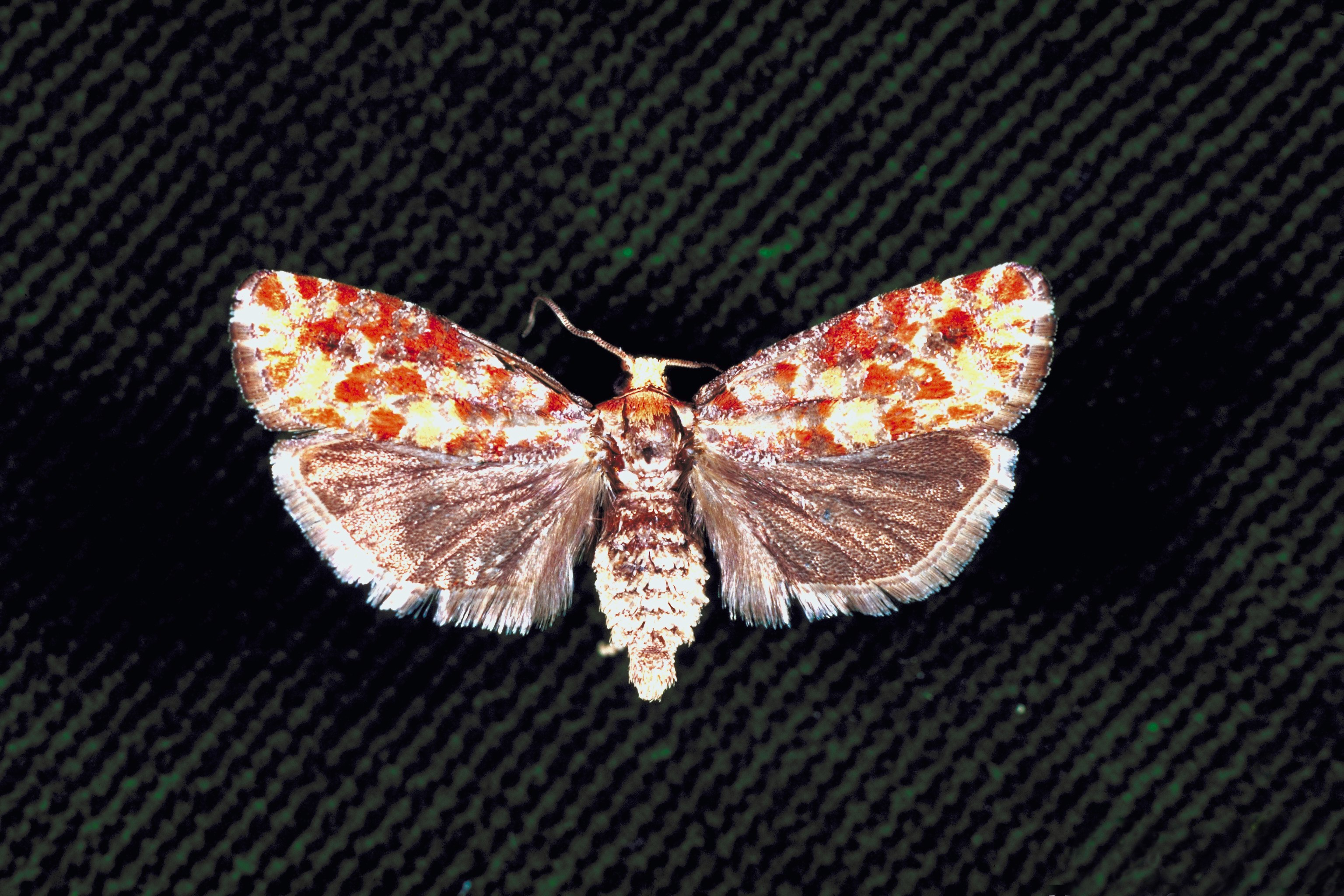

Scientific classification
- Kingdom: Animalia
- Phylum: Arthropoda
- Clade: Pancrustacea
- Class: Insecta
- Order: Lepidoptera
- Family: Tortricidae
- Genus: Eucosma
- Species: E. cocana

Binomial name
- Eucosma cocana Kearfott, 1907

Synonyms
- Eucosma rhodopaea Meyrick, 1912

= Eucosma cocana =

Species of moth

Eucosma cocana, the shortleaf pinecone borer moth, is a species of moth of the family Tortricidae. It is found in south-eastern North America and along the eastern seaboard.

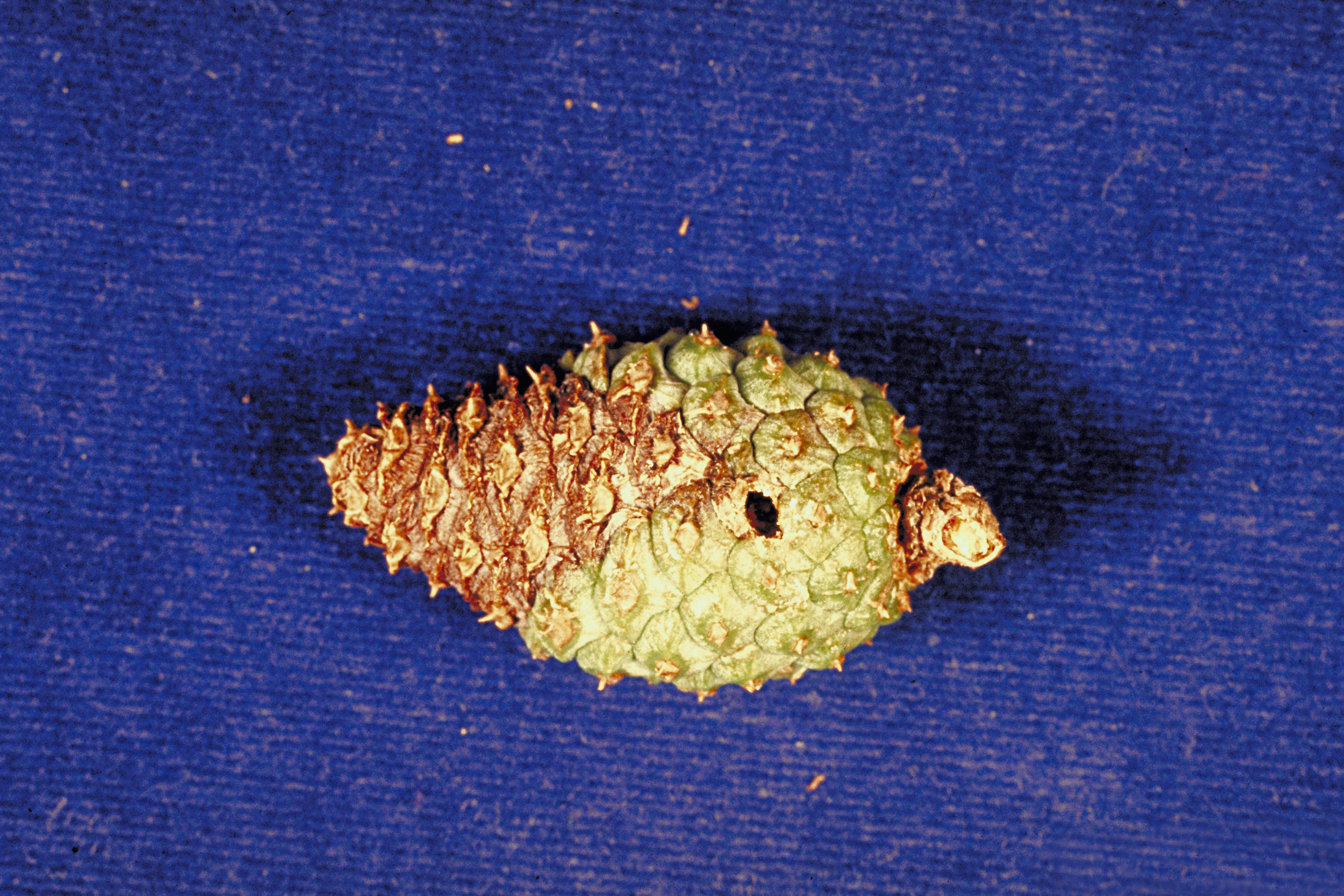
Damage

The wingspan is 18–22 mm.

The larvae feed on Pinus species, including Pinus echinata, Pinus virginiana and Pinus rigida.
