= Acleris kearfottana =

Scientific classification
- Kingdom: Animalia
- Phylum: Arthropoda
- Clade: Pancrustacea
- Class: Insecta
- Order: Lepidoptera
- Family: Tortricidae
- Genus: Acleris
- Species: A. kearfottana

Binomial name
- Acleris kearfottana (McDunnough, 1934)

Synonyms
- Peronea kearfottana McDunnough, 1934

Species of moth

Acleris kearfottana is a species of moth of the family Tortricidae. It is found in North America, where it has been recorded from Maine, Ontario, Pennsylvania, Quebec and West Virginia.

The wingspan is about 15 mm. Adults have been recorded on wing in April, July and from October to November.

The larvae feed on Comptonia peregrina, Myrica (including Myrica gale) and Hamamelis species.
