= Acleris semiannula =

Scientific classification
- Domain: Eukaryota
- Kingdom: Animalia
- Phylum: Arthropoda
- Class: Insecta
- Order: Lepidoptera
- Family: Tortricidae
- Genus: Acleris
- Species: A. semiannula

Binomial name
- Acleris semiannula (Robinson, 1869)

Synonyms
- Teras semiannula Robinson, 1869; Peronea semiannula

Species of moth

Acleris semiannula is a species of moth of the family Tortricidae. It is found in North America, where it has been recorded from Alberta, British Columbia, Illinois, Maine, Maryland, Mississippi, New Brunswick, New York, Ohio, Ontario, Pennsylvania, Quebec, South Carolina, West Virginia and Wisconsin.

The wingspan is 12–15 mm. Adults have been recorded on wing year round.

The larvae feed on Acer rubrum, Acer saccharinum and Quercus alba.
