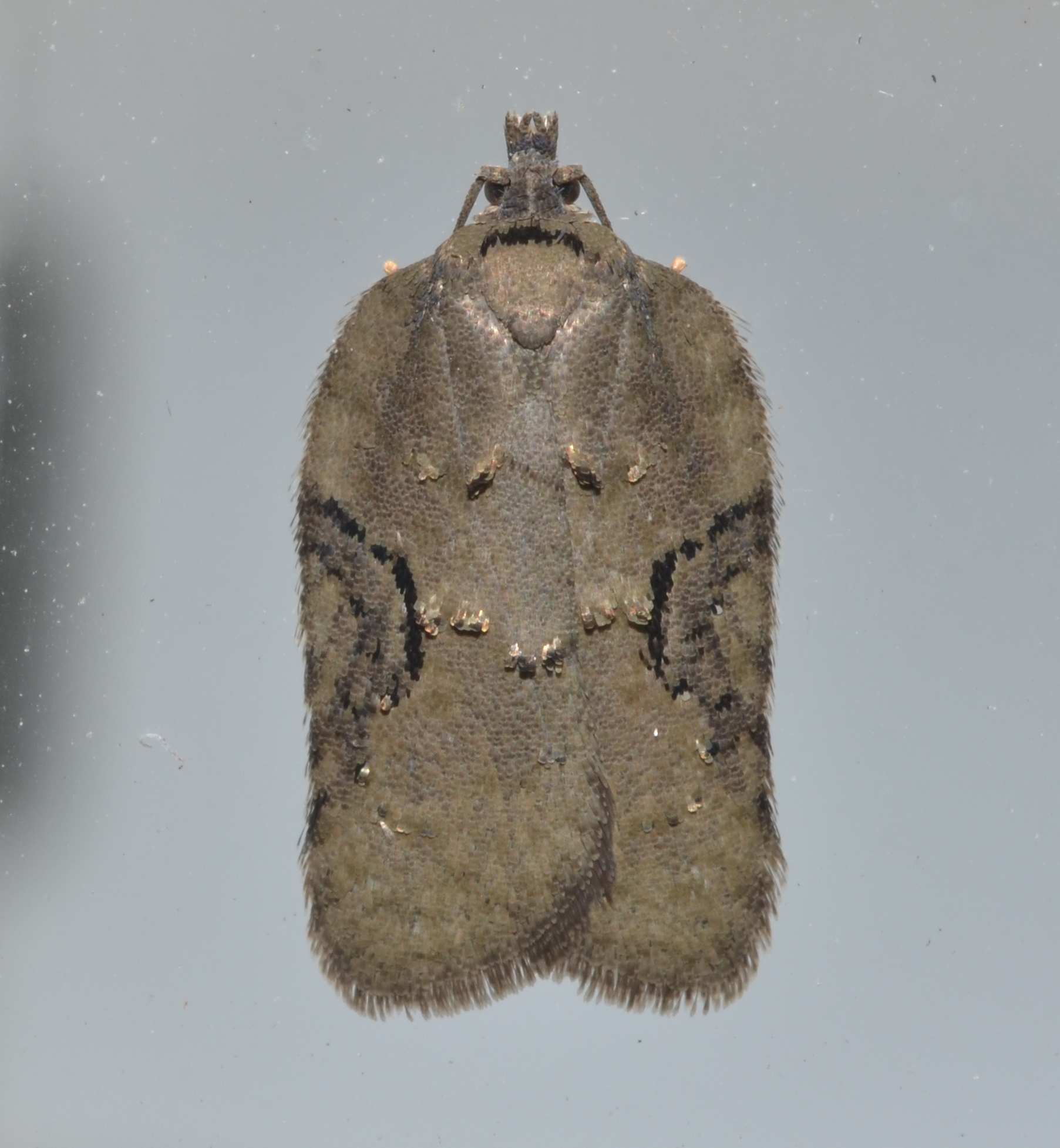

Scientific classification
- Kingdom: Animalia
- Phylum: Arthropoda
- Class: Insecta
- Order: Lepidoptera
- Family: Tortricidae
- Genus: Acleris
- Species: A. chalybeana

Binomial name
- Acleris chalybeana (Fernald, 1882)

Synonyms
- Teras chalybeana Fernald, 1882; Peronea chalybeana

= Acleris chalybeana =

Species of moth

Acleris chalybeana, the lesser maple leafroller moth, is a species of moth of the family Tortricidae. It is found in North America, where it has been recorded from Arkansas, Connecticut, Florida, Illinois, Indiana, Kentucky, Maine, Maryland, Mississippi, New Hampshire, New Jersey, New York, North Carolina, Ohio, Ontario, Pennsylvania, Quebec, South Carolina, Tennessee, West Virginia and Wisconsin.

The wingspan is 20–21 mm. The forewings are olive grey. Adults have been recorded on wing from March to November.

The larvae feed on the leaves of Acer rubrum, Acer saccharinum, Acer spicatum, Quercus rubra, Betula (including Betula papyrifera), Corylus and Fagus species. They are light green and reach a length of about 19 mm. Early instar larvae may overwinter in hibernacula on twigs of their host plant. Pupation takes place in a folded leaf shelter.
