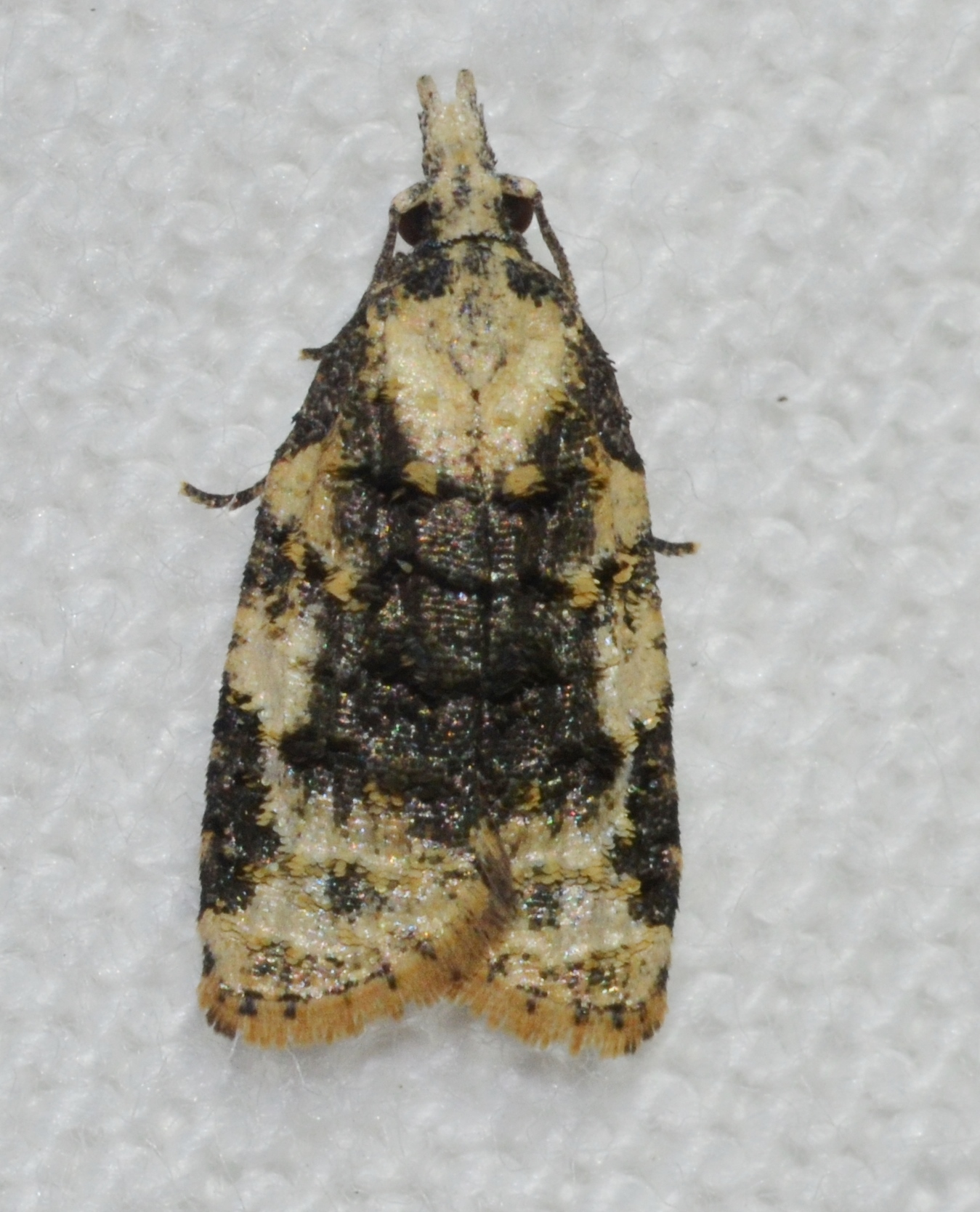

Scientific classification
- Kingdom: Animalia
- Phylum: Arthropoda
- Clade: Pancrustacea
- Class: Insecta
- Order: Lepidoptera
- Family: Tortricidae
- Genus: Platynota
- Species: P. exasperatana

Binomial name
- Platynota exasperatana (Zeller, 1875)

Synonyms
- Tortrix exasperatana Zeller, 1875; Sparganothis scotiana McDunnough, 1961; Platynota scotiana

= Platynota exasperatana =

Species of moth

Platynota exasperatana, the exasperating platynota moth, is a species of moth of the family Tortricidae. It is found in North America from Quebec to Florida, west to Texas and north to Michigan and Ontario.

The wingspan is about 13 mm. Adults have been recorded on wing from July to August.
