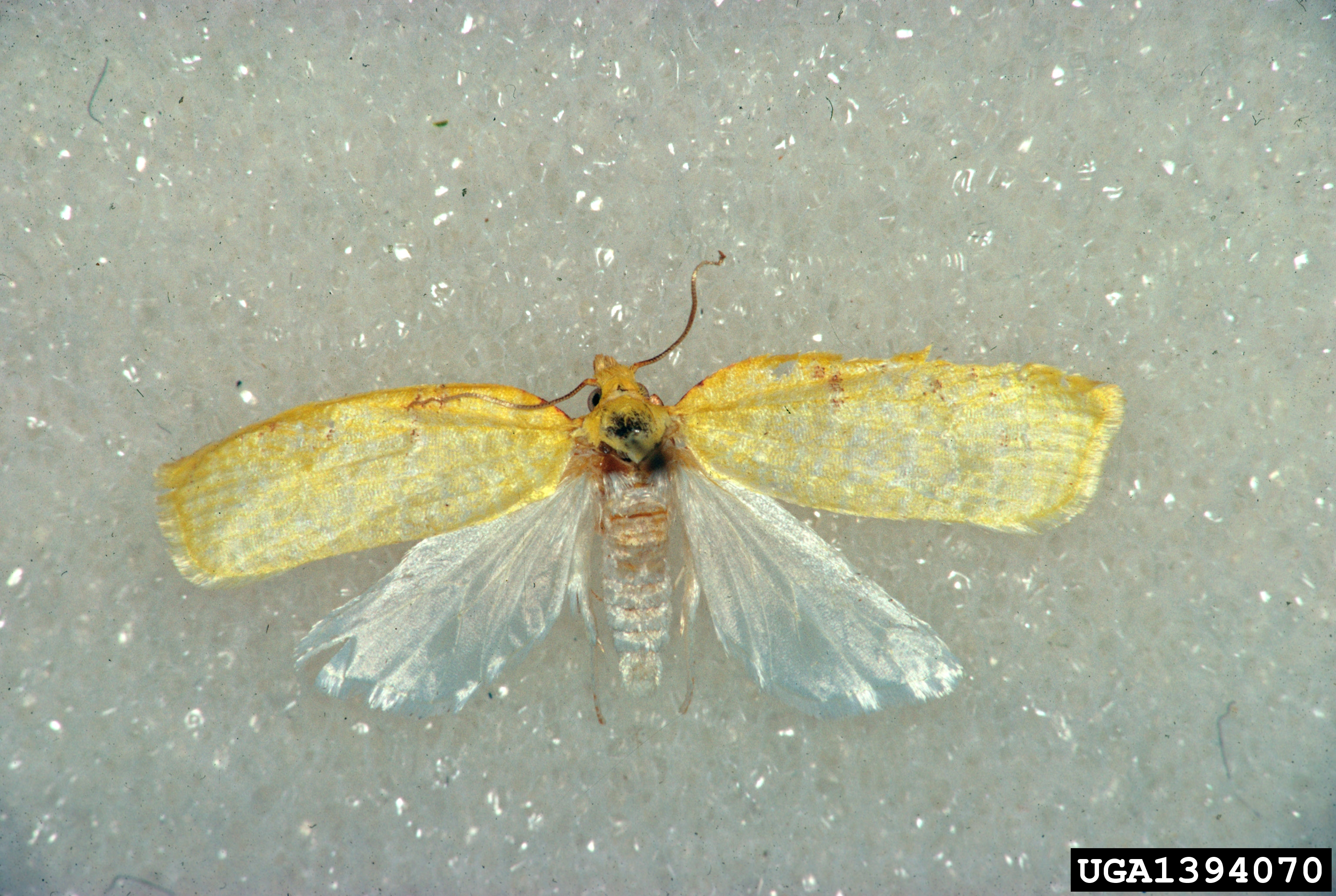

Scientific classification
- Domain: Eukaryota
- Kingdom: Animalia
- Phylum: Arthropoda
- Class: Insecta
- Order: Lepidoptera
- Family: Tortricidae
- Genus: Sparganothis
- Species: S. pettitana

Binomial name
- Sparganothis pettitana (Robinson, 1869)

Synonyms
- Tortrix pettitana Robinson, 1869; Cenopis pettitana; Sparganothis acerivorana MacKay, 1952

= Sparganothis pettitana =

Species of moth

The maple-basswood leafroller (Sparganothis pettitana) is a moth of the family Tortricidae. It is found in eastern North America, from Nova Scotia to Florida, west to Texas.

The wingspan is about 20 mm. Adults are on wing from May to July. There is one generation per year.
