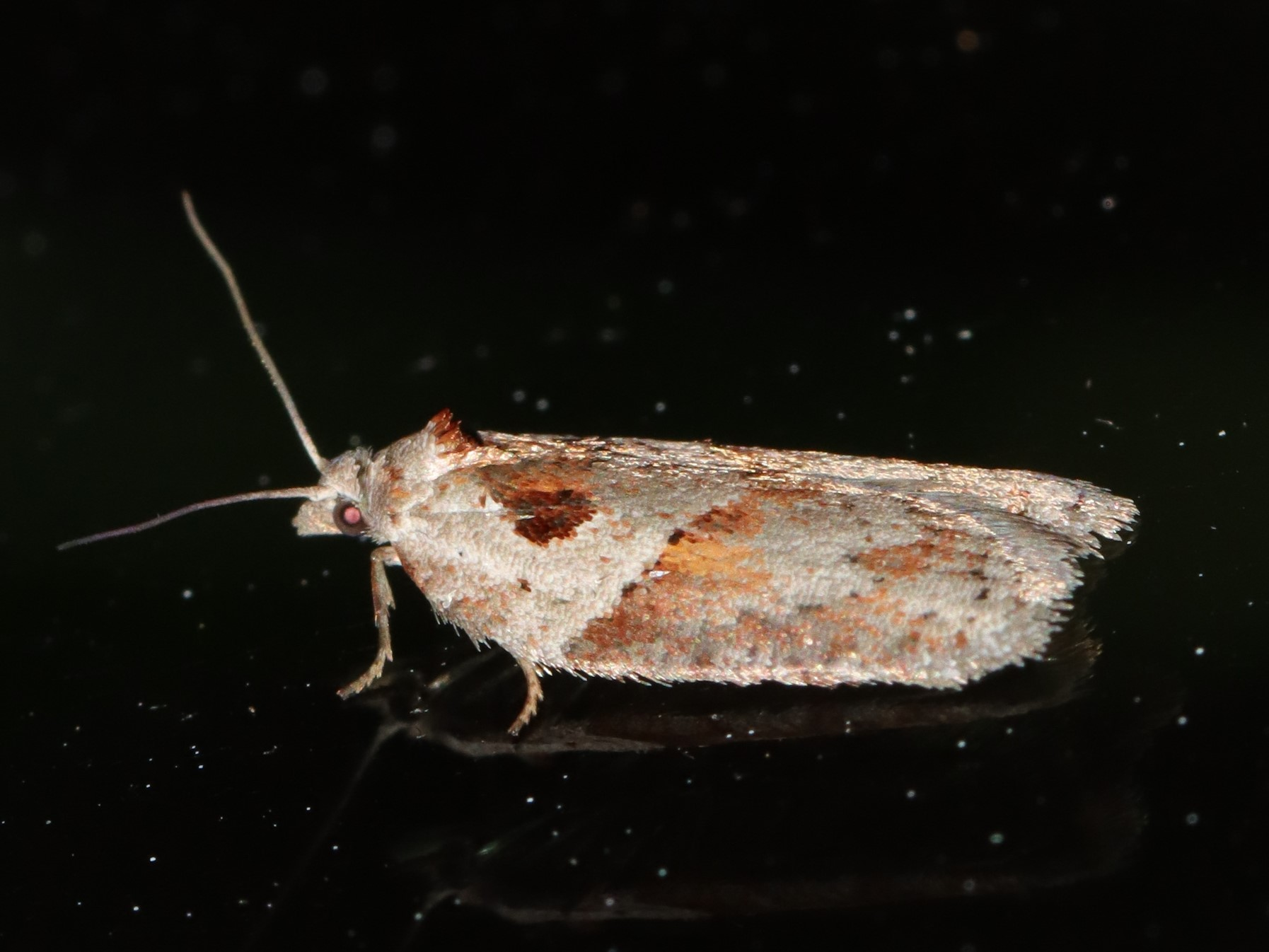

Scientific classification
- Kingdom: Animalia
- Phylum: Arthropoda
- Clade: Pancrustacea
- Class: Insecta
- Order: Lepidoptera
- Family: Tortricidae
- Genus: Acleris
- Species: A. maculidorsana

Binomial name
- Acleris maculidorsana (Clemens, 1864)

Synonyms
- Cnephasia maculidorsana Clemens, 1864; Peronea maculidorsana; Peronea hypericana Ely, 1910

= Acleris maculidorsana =

Species of moth

Acleris maculidorsana, the stained-back leafroller moth, is a species of moth of the family Tortricidae. It is found in North America, where it has been recorded from Arkansas, Florida, Georgia, Kentucky, Maine, Maryland, Massachusetts, Michigan, Mississippi, New Jersey, North Carolina, Ohio, Ontario, Pennsylvania, South Carolina, Tennessee, Virginia and Wisconsin.

The wingspan is 15–18 mm. Adults have been recorded on wing nearly year round.

The larvae feed on Chamaedaphne calyculata, Hypericum (including Hypericum perforatum), Kalmia and Vaccinium species.
