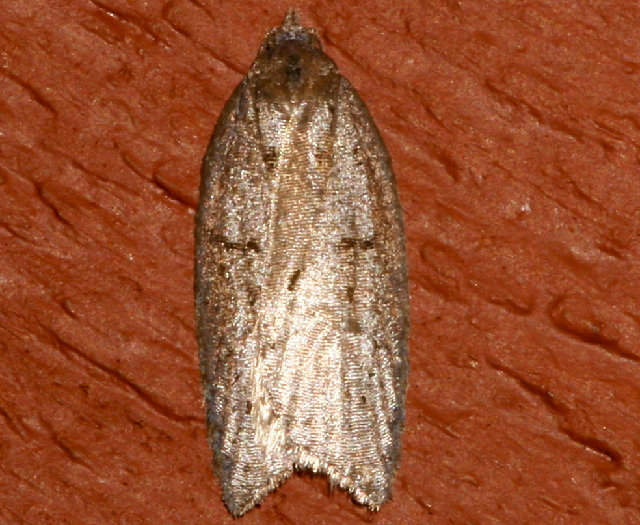

Scientific classification
- Domain: Eukaryota
- Kingdom: Animalia
- Phylum: Arthropoda
- Class: Insecta
- Order: Lepidoptera
- Family: Tortricidae
- Genus: Acleris
- Species: A. bowmanana

Binomial name
- Acleris bowmanana (McDunnough, 1934)

Synonyms
- Peronea bowmanana McDunnough, 1934

= Acleris bowmanana =

Species of moth

Acleris bowmanana is a species of moth of the family Tortricidae. It is found in North America, where it has been recorded from Alberta, British Columbia, California, Maine, Manitoba, Maryland, Michigan, New Brunswick, Ontario, Quebec, West Virginia and Wisconsin.

The wingspan is about 22 mm for males and 18–20 mm for females. Adults have been recorded on wing from January to November.

The larvae feed on Myrica gale, Picea engelmannii, Picea glauca, Aronia melanocarpa, Spiraea and Rubus species.
