= Neoeulia dorsistriatana =

Scientific classification
- Kingdom: Animalia
- Phylum: Arthropoda
- Class: Insecta
- Order: Lepidoptera
- Family: Tortricidae
- Genus: Neoeulia
- Species: N. dorsistriatana

Binomial name
- Neoeulia dorsistriatana (Walsingham, 1884)

Synonyms
- Conchylis dorsistriatana Walsingham, 1884

Species of moth

Neoeulia dorsistriatana is a species of moth of the family Tortricidae. It is found in Arizona in the United States.
