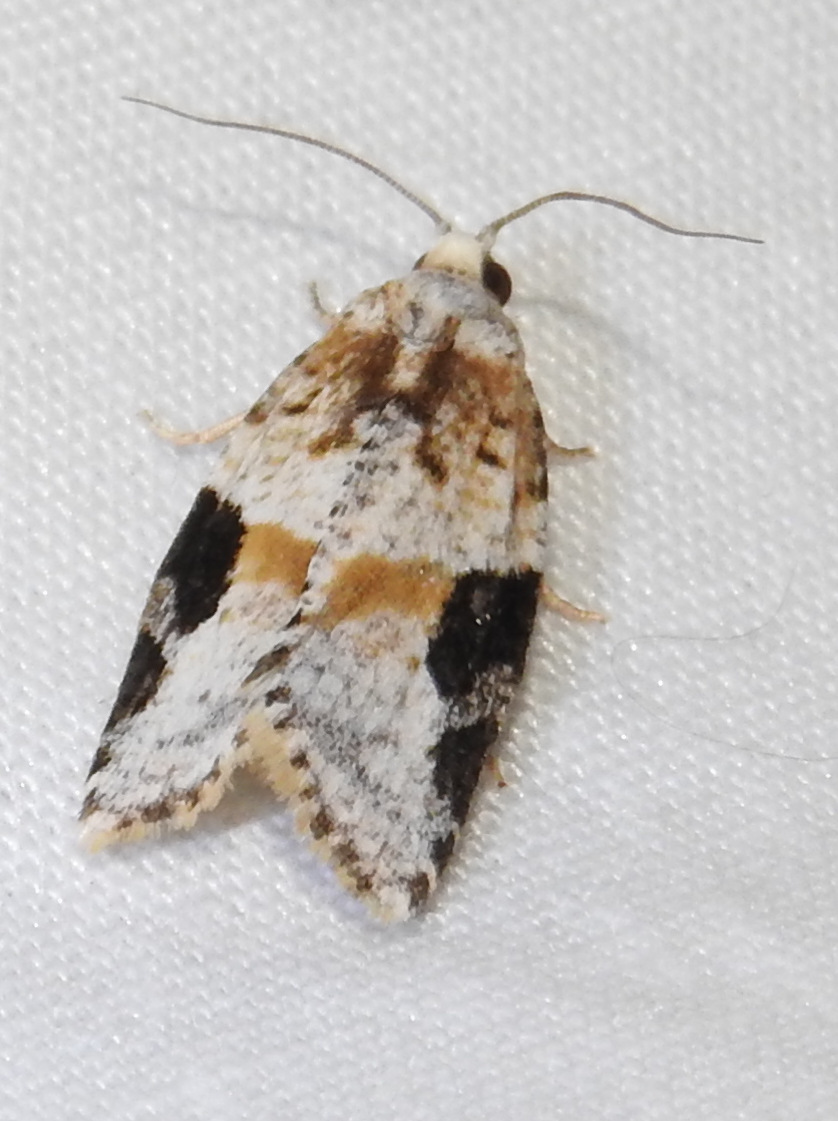

Scientific classification
- Domain: Eukaryota
- Kingdom: Animalia
- Phylum: Arthropoda
- Class: Insecta
- Order: Lepidoptera
- Family: Tortricidae
- Genus: Argyrotaenia
- Species: A. mariana

Binomial name
- Argyrotaenia mariana (Fernald, 1882)

Synonyms
- Lophoderus mariana Fernald, 1882

= Argyrotaenia mariana =

Species of moth

Argyrotaenia mariana, the gray-banded leafroller moth, is a species of moth of the family Tortricidae. It is found in North America, where it has been recorded from Connecticut, Florida, Georgia, Illinois, Indiana, Kentucky, Maine, Maryland, Massachusetts, New Brunswick, New Hampshire, New York, North Carolina, Ohio, Ontario, Pennsylvania, Quebec, Tennessee and West Virginia.

The wingspan is about 20 mm. Adults have been recorded on wing from March to August.

The larvae feed on Acer species, Prenanthes species (including Prenanthes trifoliata) Alnus species, Betula species (including Betula alleghaniensis, Betula papyrifera, Betula populifolia), Viburnum species, Kalmia angustifolia, Vaccinium species (including Vaccinium uliginosum), Quercus species, Malus species (including Malus pumila, Malus sylvestris), Prunus virginiana, Pyrus species, Populus tremuloides, Salix species and Ulmus americana.
