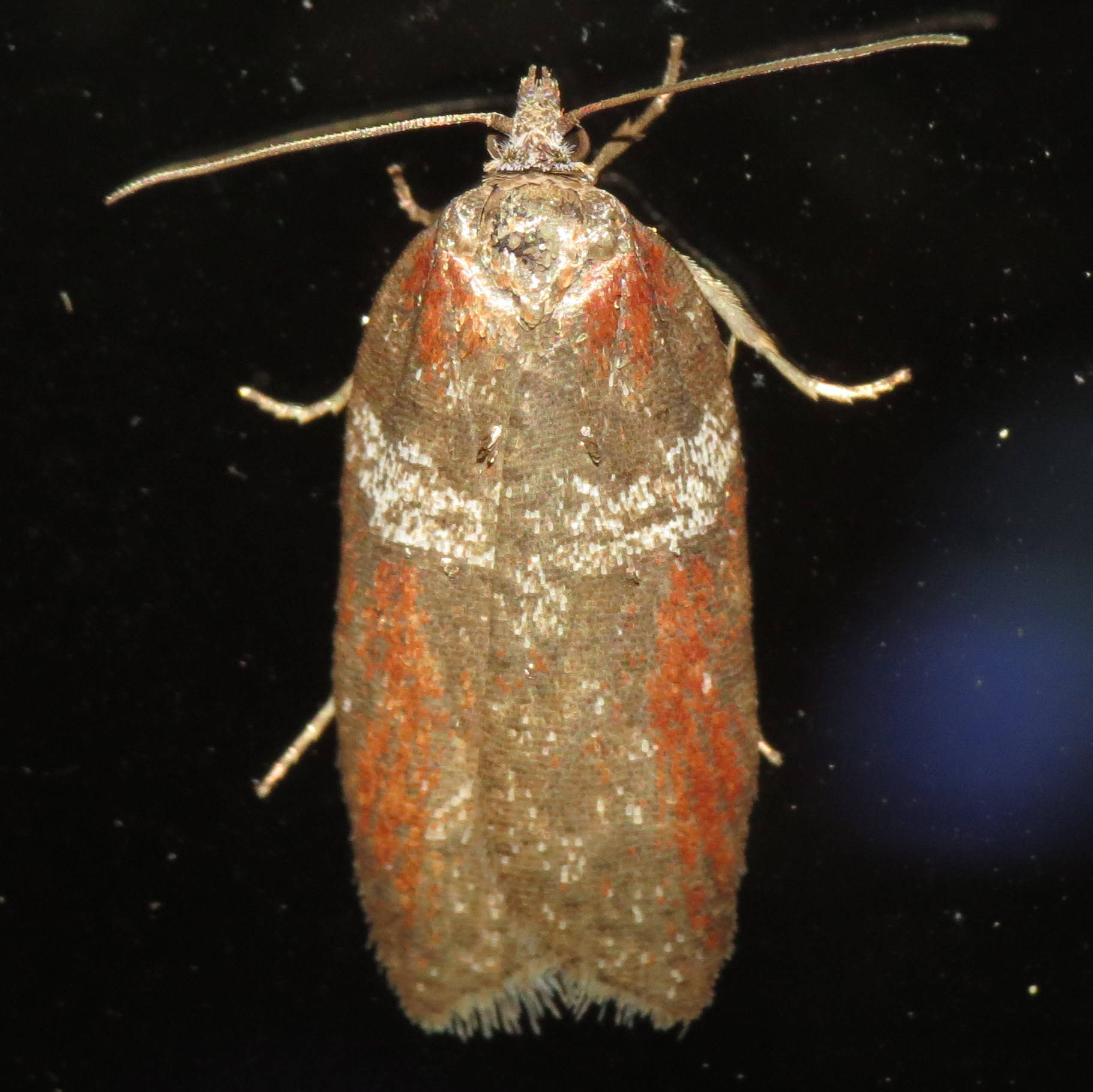
- Acleris celiana - Searsmont Maine, May 2014

Scientific classification
- Domain: Eukaryota
- Kingdom: Animalia
- Phylum: Arthropoda
- Class: Insecta
- Order: Lepidoptera
- Family: Tortricidae
- Genus: Acleris
- Species: A. celiana

Binomial name
- Acleris celiana (Robinson, 1869)

Synonyms
- Teras celiana Robinson, 1869; Peronea celiana; Acleris albilineana Kearfott, 1907

= Acleris celiana =

Species of moth

Acleris celiana, Celiana's Acleris, is a species of moth of the family Tortricidae. It is found in North America, where it has been recorded from Alberta, British Columbia, Illinois, Maine, Massachusetts, Michigan, Minnesota, New Brunswick, New Hampshire, North Carolina, North Dakota, Ontario, Quebec, Virginia and Wisconsin.

The wingspan is about 18 mm. Adults have been recorded on wing from March to November.

The larvae feed on Prunus virginiana, Betula (including Betula nana and Betula papyrifera) and Salix species.
