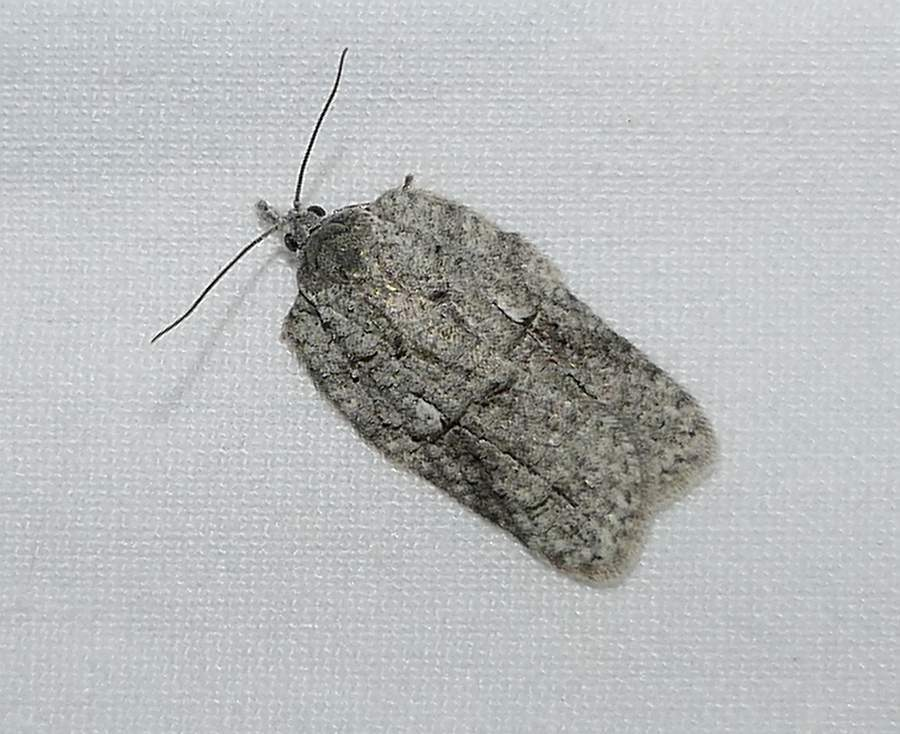

Scientific classification
- Domain: Eukaryota
- Kingdom: Animalia
- Phylum: Arthropoda
- Class: Insecta
- Order: Lepidoptera
- Family: Tortricidae
- Genus: Acleris
- Species: A. nigrolinea

Binomial name
- Acleris nigrolinea (Robinson, 1869)

Synonyms
- List: Teras nigrolinea Robinson, 1869; Acleris nigrilinea; Peronea nigrilinea; Acleris disputabilis Obraztsov, 1963; Teras ferruginiguttana Fernald, 1882

= Acleris nigrolinea =

Species of moth

Acleris nigrolinea is a species of moth in the family Tortricidae. It is found in North America, where it has been recorded across Canada from British Columbia to New Brunswick, and in the United States as far south as California, Arizona, Tennessee and North Carolina.

The wingspan is 22–27 mm. Adults have been recorded on wing nearly year round depending on the location.

The larvae feed on Betula alleghaniensis, Betula papyrifera, Prunus virginiana, Populus balsamifera, Populus tremuloides, Abies, Pinus and Salix species.
