= Acleris oxycoccana =

Scientific classification
- Kingdom: Animalia
- Phylum: Arthropoda
- Clade: Pancrustacea
- Class: Insecta
- Order: Lepidoptera
- Family: Tortricidae
- Genus: Acleris
- Species: A. oxycoccana

Binomial name
- Acleris oxycoccana (Packard, 1869)

Synonyms
- Tortrix oxycoccana Packard, 1869; Peronea oxycoccana

Species of moth

Acleris oxycoccana is a species of moth of the family Tortricidae. It is found in North America, where it has been recorded from Alberta, British Columbia, Indiana, Maine, Manitoba, Michigan, Minnesota, Newfoundland, Ontario, Pennsylvania, West Virginia and Wisconsin.

The wingspan is 13–15 mm. Adults have been recorded on wing nearly year round.

The larvae feed on Chamaedaphne calyculata and Prunus pumila.
