= Acleris minuta =

Scientific classification
- Domain: Eukaryota
- Kingdom: Animalia
- Phylum: Arthropoda
- Class: Insecta
- Order: Lepidoptera
- Family: Tortricidae
- Genus: Acleris
- Species: A. minuta

Binomial name
- Acleris minuta (Robinson, 1869)

Synonyms
- Tortrix minuta Robinson, 1869; Peronea minuta; Tortrix cinderella Riley, 1872; Tortrix malivorana Le Baron, 1871; Tortrix vacciniivorana Packard, 1870; Teras variolana Zeller, 1875

Species of moth

Acleris minuta, the yellow-headed fireworm or lesser apple leaf-folder, is a species of moth of the family Tortricidae. It is found in eastern North America.

The length of the forewings is 6.5–9.5 mm. Adults are on wing in up to three generations per year and have been recorded on wing from June to August and in October.

The larvae feed on Myrica gale, Calluna, Kalmia (including Kalmia angustifolia), Vaccinium (including Vaccinium macrocarpon), Malus (including Malus pumila), Prunus, Pyrus and Salix species.
