= Acleris keiferi =

Scientific classification
- Kingdom: Animalia
- Phylum: Arthropoda
- Clade: Pancrustacea
- Class: Insecta
- Order: Lepidoptera
- Family: Tortricidae
- Genus: Acleris
- Species: A. keiferi

Binomial name
- Acleris keiferi Powell, 1964

Species of moth

Acleris keiferi is a species of moth of the family Tortricidae. It is found in North America, where it has been recorded from California and Idaho.

Adults have been recorded on wing from May to October.

The larvae feed on Rosa californica, Rubus ursinus and Fragaria species.
