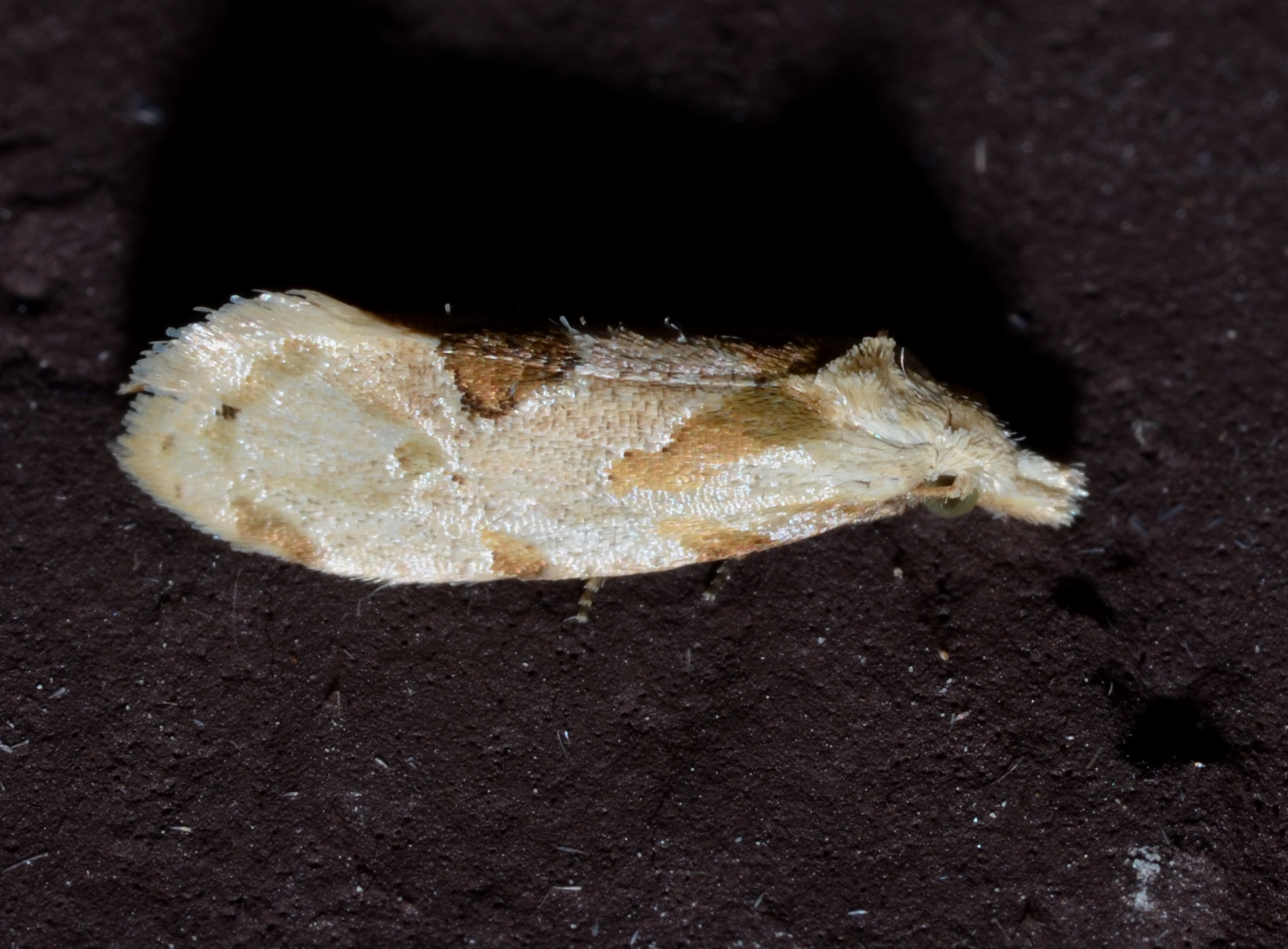

Scientific classification
- Domain: Eukaryota
- Kingdom: Animalia
- Phylum: Arthropoda
- Class: Insecta
- Order: Lepidoptera
- Family: Tortricidae
- Genus: Aethes
- Species: A. angulatana

Binomial name
- Aethes angulatana (Robinson, 1869)

Synonyms
- Conchylis angulatana Robinson, 1869; Hysterosia angulatana; Phalonia angulatana; Phtheochroa angulatana

= Aethes angulatana =

Species of moth

Aethes angulatana, the angular aethes, is a species of moth of the family Tortricidae. It is found from Quebec and Maine to Florida, west to Texas and north to Minnesota.

The wingspan is 10–16 mm. Adults are on wing from June to September in the northern part of the range but earlier in the south.
