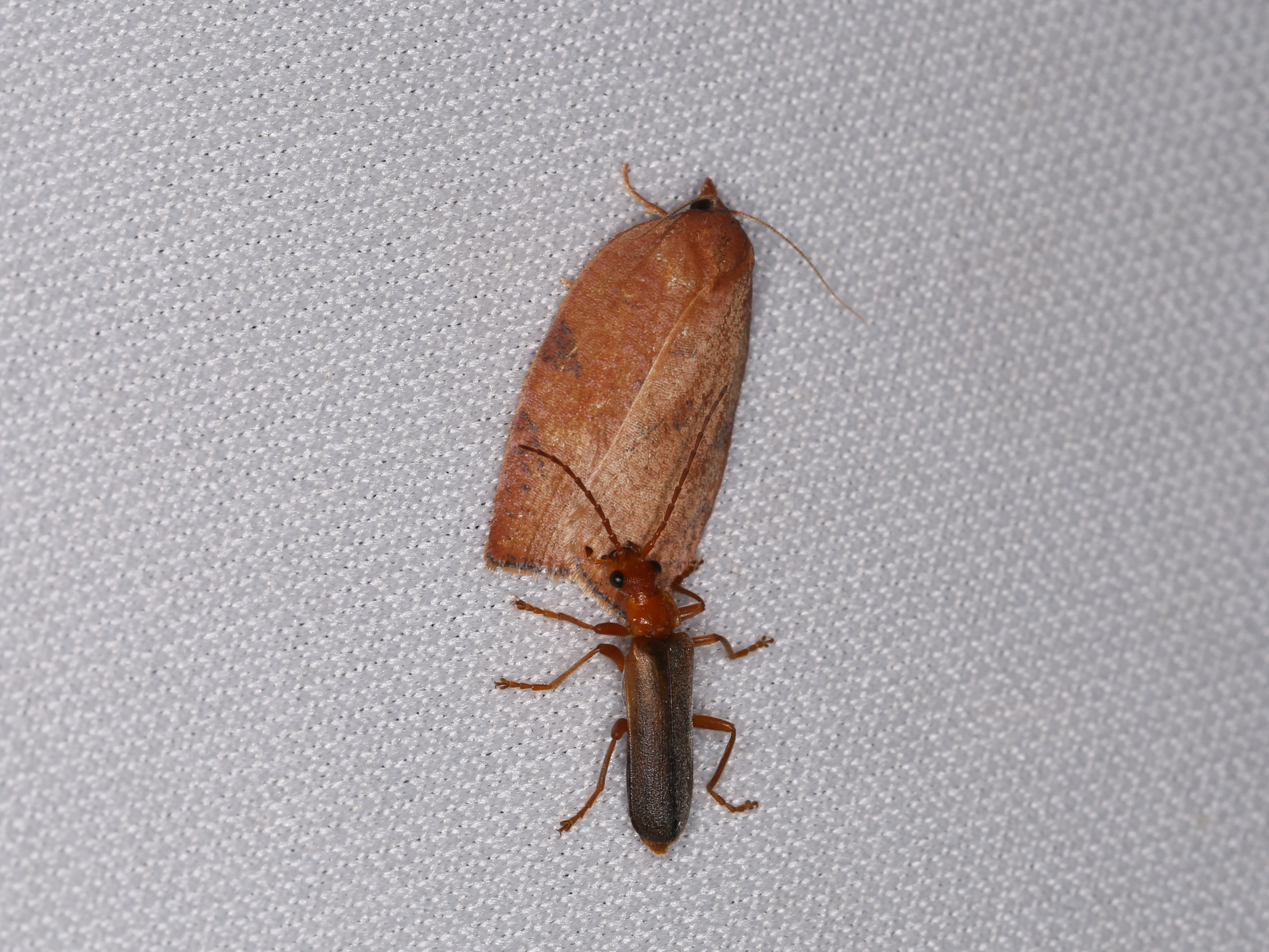

Scientific classification
- Kingdom: Animalia
- Phylum: Arthropoda
- Clade: Pancrustacea
- Class: Insecta
- Order: Lepidoptera
- Family: Tortricidae
- Genus: Amorbia
- Species: A. cuneanum

Binomial name
- Amorbia cuneanum (Walsingham, 1879)

Synonyms
- Hendecastema cuneana Walsingham, 1879; Amorbia cuneana; Hendecastema adumbrana Walsingham, 1879; Amorbia adumbrana; Amorbia essigana Busck, 1929; Amorbia synneurana Barnes & Busck, 1920

= Amorbia cuneanum =

Species of moth

Amorbia cuneanum, the western avocado leafroller moth, is a species of moth of the family Tortricidae. It is found from Baja California, Mexico, to south-western Canada. To the east, the range extends to Arizona and Idaho in the United States.

The length of the forewings is 11.5–13 mm for males and 12–14.5 mm for females. Adults are on wing year round in two generations per year.

The larvae feed on Abies concolor, Rhus laurina, Arctostaphylos insularis, Arcotostaphylos patula, Persea americana, Laurus species, Ceanothus arboreus, Heteromeles arbutifolia, Lyonothamnus floribundus, Prunus species (including Prunus lyonii), Citrus species and Salix species. Full-grown larvae reach a length of about 25 mm.
