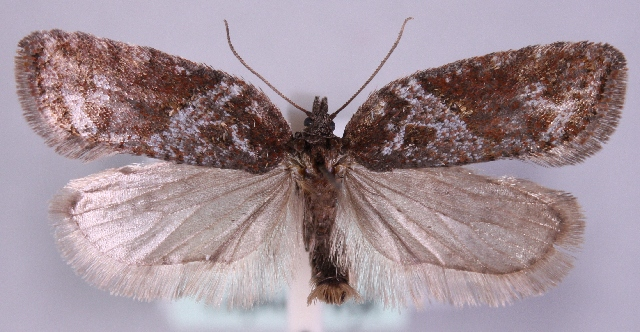

Scientific classification
- Kingdom: Animalia
- Phylum: Arthropoda
- Class: Insecta
- Order: Lepidoptera
- Family: Tortricidae
- Genus: Acleris
- Species: A. arcticana

Binomial name
- Acleris arcticana (Guenee, 1845)

Synonyms
- Teras arcticana Guenee, 1845; Teras articana Ragonot, 1894; Acleris boreana Wolff, 1964; Peronea caryosphena Meyrick, 1937; Peronea walkerana McDunnough, 1934

= Acleris arcticana =

Species of moth

Acleris arcticana is a species of moth of the family Tortricidae. It is found in Norway, Sweden, Finland, Greenland and North America, where it has been recorded from Ontario, Illinois and Wisconsin.

The wingspan is 14–24 mm. Adults are on wing from April to June and from August to September.

The larvae feed on Salix glauca.
