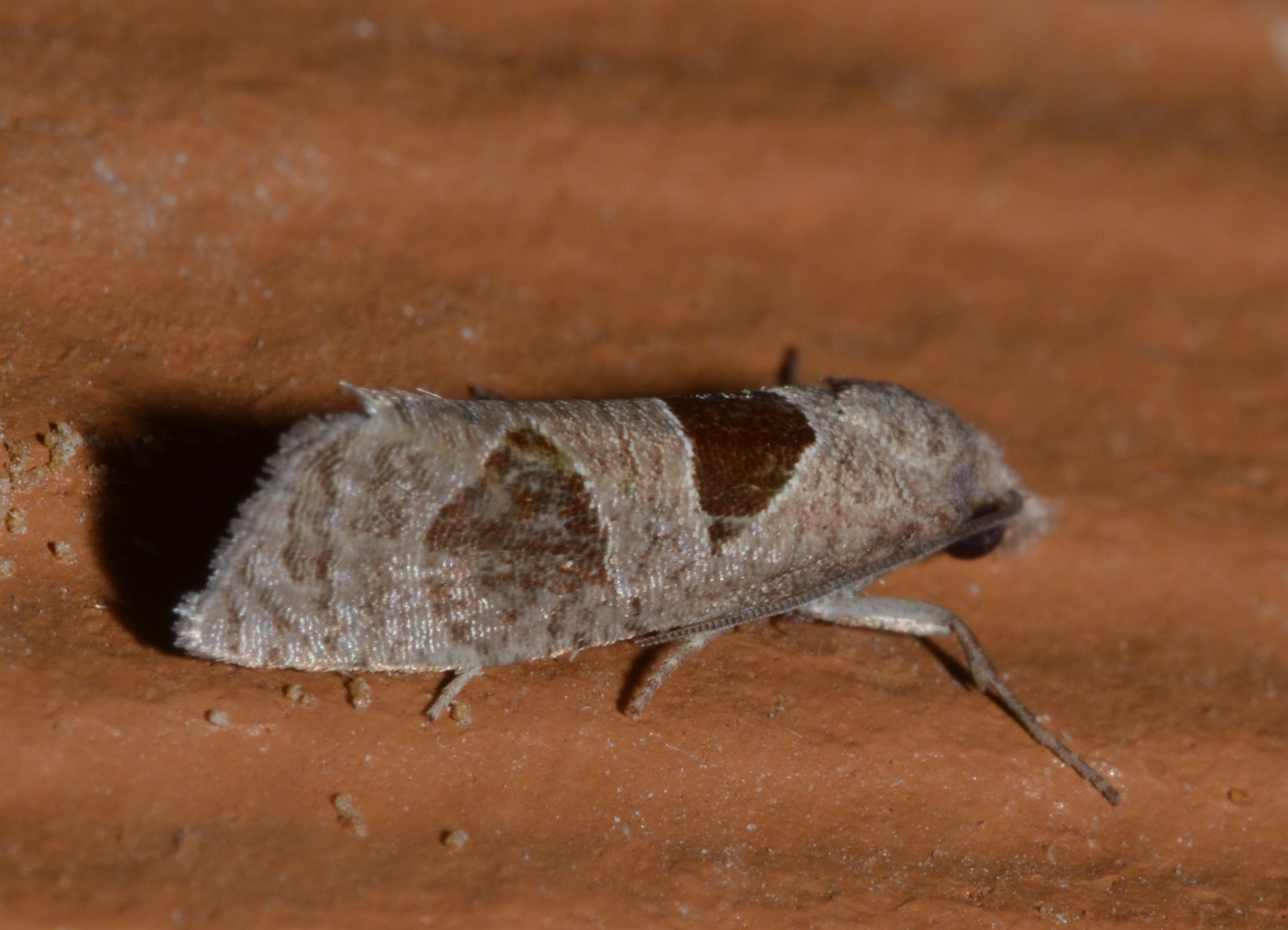

Scientific classification
- Kingdom: Animalia
- Phylum: Arthropoda
- Clade: Pancrustacea
- Class: Insecta
- Order: Lepidoptera
- Family: Tortricidae
- Genus: Eucosma
- Species: E. dorsisignatana

Binomial name
- Eucosma dorsisignatana (Clemens, 1860)

Synonyms
- Poecilochroma dorsisignatana Clemens, 1860; Pelochrista dorsisignatana; Paedisca clavana Zeller, 1875; Eucosma dorsisignatana var. diffusana Kearfott, 1905; Carpocapsa distigmana Walker, 1863

= Eucosma dorsisignatana =

Species of moth

Eucosma dorsisignatana, the triangle-backed eucosma, is a species of moth of the family Tortricidae. It is found in North America, where it has been recorded from Nova Scotia to Florida, west to Texas and north to Manitoba.

The wingspan is 12–22 mm. Adults are on wing from July to November.

The larvae feed on the roots of Solidago species.
