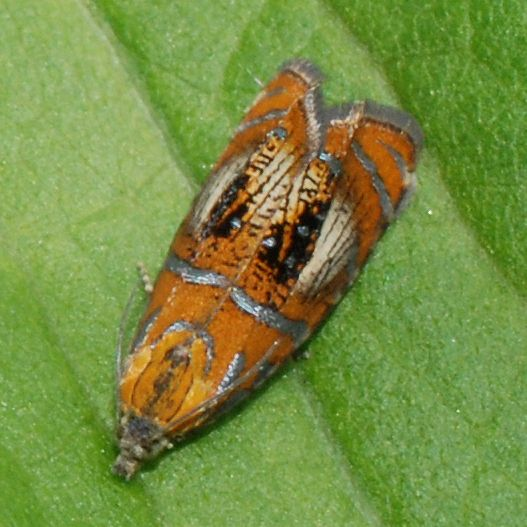
- Adult O. arcuella in the Welser Heide (Austria)

Scientific classification
- Kingdom: Animalia
- Phylum: Arthropoda
- Clade: Pancrustacea
- Class: Insecta
- Order: Lepidoptera
- Family: Tortricidae
- Tribe: Olethreutini
- Genus: Olethreutes; Hübner, 1822

Type species
- Phalaena arcuella Clerck, 1759

Diversity
- 131 species (but see text)

Synonyms
- Exartema Clemens, 1860; Mixodia Guenée, 1845; Roxana Stephens, 1834 and see text

= Olethreutes =

Genus of tortrix moths

Olethreutes is a large genus of tortrix moths (family Tortricidae). It is the type genus of its tribe (Olethreutini) and subfamily (Olethreutinae).

Celyphoides, Loxoterma and Paracelypha are sometimes listed as junior synonyms of Olethreutes. But the type species of the first is Tortrix flavipalpana (now Celypha flavipalpana), that of the second is T. latifasciana (now C. aurofasciana), and that of the third is Phalaena rivulana (now Syricoris rivulana). This makes Celyphoides and Loxoterma junior subjective synonyms of Celypha and Paracelypha a junior subjective synonym of Syricoris, at least according to the present delimitation of these genera.

== Species ==
This genus has long served as "wastebin genus" for Olethreutinae, many of which were formerly placed here but are nowadays assigned to related genera. Especially Argyroploce was included in Olethreutes by some authors even in recent times. Phiaris micana (the type species of Phiaris) has erroneously been listed in the present genus, even though Phiaris is generally regarded as distinct; its delimitation versus Olethreutes requires more study however.

The 131 species at least provisionally placed in Olethreutes today are:

- Olethreutes agatha Falkovitsh, 1966
- Olethreutes agnota Diakonoff, 1973
- Olethreutes albiciliana (Fernald, 1882)
- Olethreutes aliana Kawabe, 1993
- Olethreutes anisorrhopa Diakonoff, 1983
- Olethreutes appalachiana (Braun, 1951)
- Olethreutes appendiceum (Zeller, 1875)
- Olethreutes arcuella
- Olethreutes astrologana (Zeller, 1875)
- Olethreutes atrodentana (Fernald, 1882)
- Olethreutes auricapitana (Walsingham, 1879)
- Olethreutes aviana (Falkovitsh, 1959)
- Olethreutes baccatana (McDunnough, 1942)
- Olethreutes bicoloranum (McDunnough, 1922)
- Olethreutes bidentata Kuznetzov, 1971
- Olethreutes bipartitana (Clemens, 1860)
- Olethreutes bowmanana (McDunnough, 1923)
- Olethreutes brevirostratum (Heinrich, 1926)
- Olethreutes brunneopurpurata (Heinrich, 1923)
- Olethreutes buckellana (McDunnough, 1922)
- Olethreutes cacuminana (Kennel, 1901)
- Olethreutes camillana (Kennel, 1918)
- Olethreutes cana Kawabe, 1993
- Olethreutes capnodesma (Meyrick, 1922)
- Olethreutes captiosana (Falkovitsh, 1960)
- Olethreutes carolana (McDunnough, 1922)
- Olethreutes clavana (Walker, 1863)
- Olethreutes comandranum (Clarke, 1953)
- Olethreutes concinnana (Clemens, 1865)
- Olethreutes connectum (McDunnough, 1935)
- Olethreutes coruscana (Clemens, 1860)
- Olethreutes corylana (Fernald, 1882)
- Olethreutes costimaculana (Fernald, 1882)
- Olethreutes delitana (Staudinger, 1880)
- Olethreutes deprecatoria Heinrich, 1926
- Olethreutes devotana Kearfott, 1907
- Olethreutes diallacta (Meyrick, 1932)
- Olethreutes dissolutana (Stange, 1886)
- Olethreutes doubledayana (Barrett, 1872)
- Olethreutes electrofuscum (Heinrich, 1923)
- Olethreutes ernestiana (Obraztsov, 1961)
- Olethreutes exaeresimum (Heinrich, 1926)
- Olethreutes exaridanus Kuznetzov in Kuznetzov & Mikkola, 1991
- Olethreutes exoletum (Zeller, 1875)
- Olethreutes fagigemmeana (Chambers, 1878)
- Olethreutes fasciatana (Clemens, 1860)
- Olethreutes ferriferana (Walker, 1863)
- Olethreutes ferrolineana (Walker, 1863)
- Olethreutes ferrugineanum (Riley, 1881)
- Olethreutes flammanus Kawabe, 1993
- Olethreutes footiana (Fernald, 1882)
- Olethreutes fraternanum (McDunnough, 1924)
- Olethreutes furfuranum (McDunnough, 1922)
- Olethreutes galaxana Kearfott, 1907
- Olethreutes galevora (McDunnough, 1956)
- Olethreutes glaciana (Möschler, 1860)
- Olethreutes griseoalbana (Walsingham, 1879)
- Olethreutes hamameliana (McDunnough, 1944)
- Olethreutes heinrichana (McDunnough, 1927)
- Olethreutes helveticana (Duponchel, 1844)
- Olethreutes hemiplaca (Meyrick, 1922)
- Olethreutes hippocastanum (Kearfott, 1907)
- Olethreutes humeralis (Walsingham, 1900)
- Olethreutes hummeli (Caradja, 1935)
- Olethreutes ineptana (Kennel, 1901)
- Olethreutes inornatana (Clemens, 1860)
- Olethreutes inquietana (Walker, 1863)
- Olethreutes irina Falkovitsh, 1966
- Olethreutes kamtshadala (Falkovitsh, 1966)
- Olethreutes kennethana McDunnough, 1941
- Olethreutes kurdistana (Amsel, 1959)
- Olethreutes lacunana (Freeman, 1941)
- Olethreutes magadana (Falkovitsh, 1965)
- Olethreutes malana (Fernald, 1882)
- Olethreutes manoi (Kawabe, 1987)
- Olethreutes mediopartitum (Heinrich, 1923)
- Olethreutes meifengensis Kawabe, 1993
- Olethreutes melanomesum (Heinrich, 1923)
- Olethreutes mengelana (Fernald, 1894)
- Olethreutes merrickanum (Kearfott, 1907)
- Olethreutes metallicana (Hübner, [1799])
- Olethreutes minaki (McDunnough, 1929)
- Olethreutes moderata Falkovitsh, 1962
- Olethreutes monetiferanum (Riley, 1881)
- Olethreutes mysteriana Miller, 1979
- Olethreutes nananum (McDunnough, 1922)
- Olethreutes nigranum (Heinrich, 1923)
- Olethreutes nigricrista Kuznetzov, 1976
- Olethreutes nitidana (Clemens, 1860)
- Olethreutes nomas Diakonoff, 1983
- Olethreutes nordeggana (McDunnough, 1922)
- Olethreutes nubicincta Diakonoff, 1973
- Olethreutes obovata (Walsingham, 1900)
- Olethreutes obsoletana (Zetterstedt, 1839)
- Olethreutes ochrosuffusanum (Heinrich, 1923)
- Olethreutes olivaceana (Fernald, 1882)
- Olethreutes orthocosma (Meyrick, 1931)
- Olethreutes osmundana (Fernald, 1879)
- Olethreutes palustrana (Lienig & Zeller, 1846)
- Olethreutes perdicoptera (Wileman & Stringer, 1929)
- Olethreutes permundana (Clemens, 1860)
- Olethreutes pfeifferiana (Obraztsov, 1961)
- Olethreutes polluxana (McDunnough, 1922)
- Olethreutes praeterminata (Caradja, 1933)
- Olethreutes predotai Hartig, 1938
- Olethreutes punctanum (Walsingham, 1903)
- Olethreutes quadrifidum (Zeller, 1875)
- Olethreutes rusticanum (McDunnough, 1922)
- Olethreutes sayonae Kawabe, 1993
- Olethreutes schulziana (Fabricius, 1776)
- Olethreutes sciotana (Heinrich, 1923)
- Olethreutes scoriana (Guenée, 1845)
- Olethreutes septentrionana (Curtis in Ross, 1835)
- Olethreutes sericoranum (Walsingham, 1879)
- Olethreutes sordidana (McDunnough, 1922)
- Olethreutes spiraeanus Kuznetzov, 1962
- Olethreutes stibiana (Guenée, 1845)
- Olethreutes submissanum (McDunnough, 1922)
- Olethreutes subnubilum (Heinrich, 1923)
- Olethreutes subretracta Kawabe, 1976
- Olethreutes subtilana (Falkovitsh, 1959)
- Olethreutes tenebricum (Heinrich, 1926)
- Olethreutes tephrea Falkovitsh, 1966
- Olethreutes tilianum (Heinrich, 1923)
- Olethreutes trinitana (McDunnough, 1931)
- Olethreutes troglodanum (McDunnough, 1922)
- Olethreutes turfosana (Herrich-Schäffer, 1851)
- Olethreutes umbrosana (Freyer, 1842)
- Olethreutes valdanum (McDunnough, 1922)
- Olethreutes versicolorana (Clemens, 1860)
- Olethreutes viburnanum (McDunnough, 1935)
