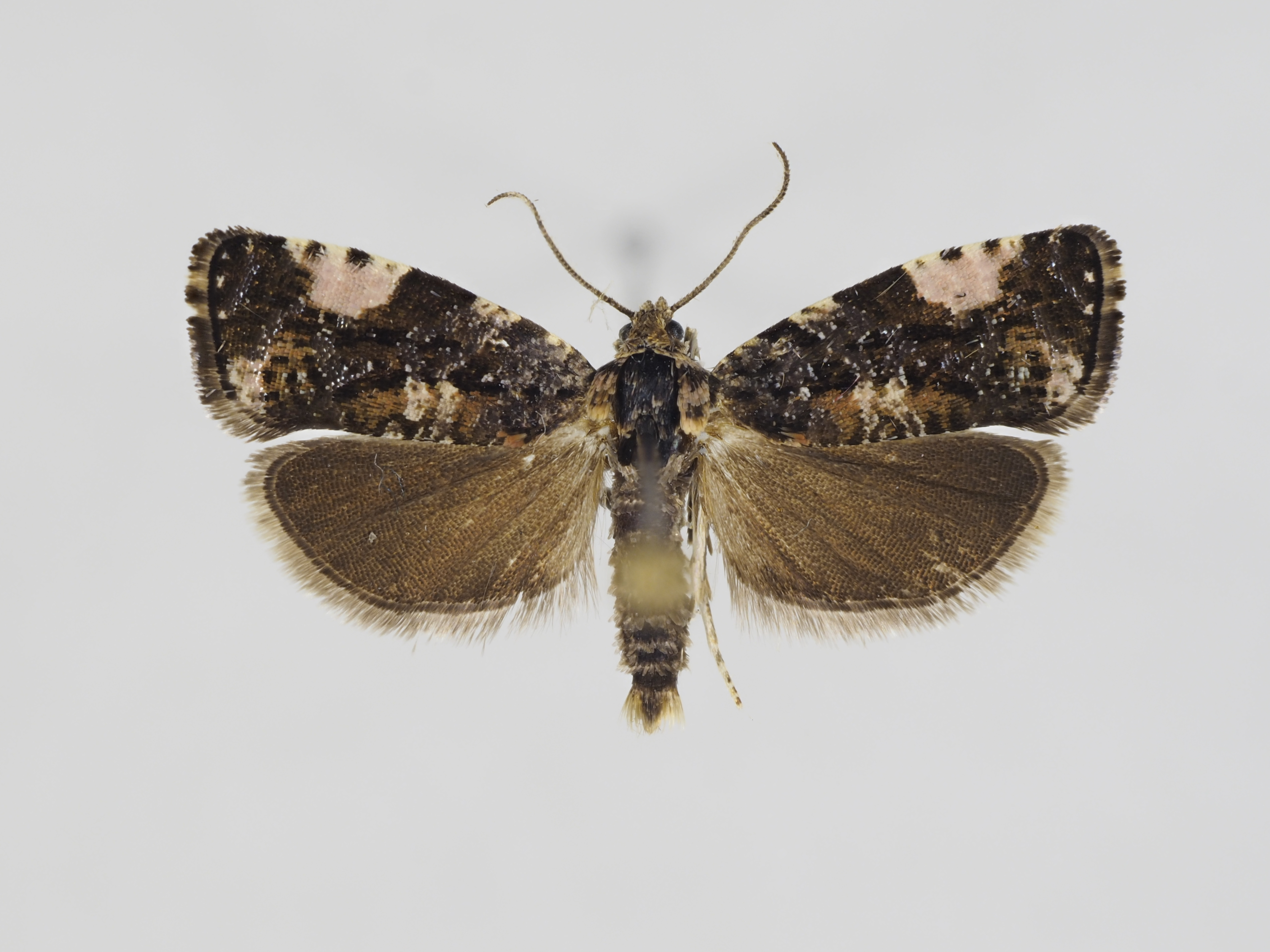

Scientific classification
- Kingdom: Animalia
- Phylum: Arthropoda
- Class: Insecta
- Order: Lepidoptera
- Family: Tortricidae
- Genus: Argyroploce
- Species: A. externa

Binomial name
- Argyroploce externa (Eversmann, 1844)

= Argyroploce externa =

Species of moth

Argyroploce externa is a species of tortrix moth. It is native to Europe and North America.
