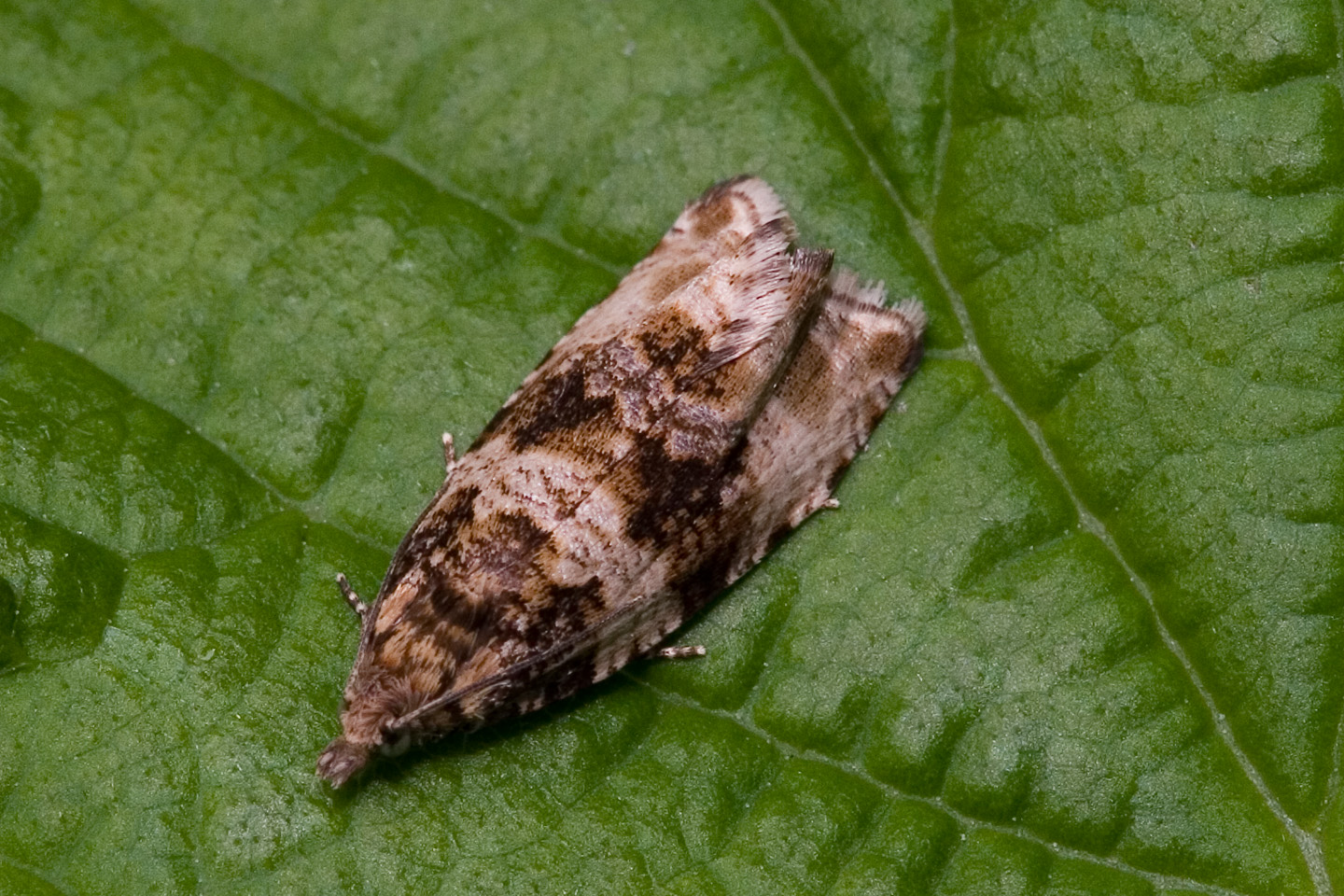

Scientific classification
- Domain: Eukaryota
- Kingdom: Animalia
- Phylum: Arthropoda
- Class: Insecta
- Order: Lepidoptera
- Family: Tortricidae
- Genus: Celypha
- Species: C. cespitana

Binomial name
- Celypha cespitana (Hübner, 1817)

Synonyms
- List: Tortrix cespitana Hübner, 1817; Rhyacionia flavofasciana Humphreys & Westwood, 1845; Orthotaenia gramineana Curtis, 1831; Sericoris instrutana Clemens, 1865; Argyroploce kirinana Toll, 1949; Argyroploce cespitana ab. marpurgna Strand, 1920; Sericoris poana Zeller, 1875; Phalaena umbriana Scopoli, 1763

= Celypha cespitana =

Species of moth

Celypha cespitana is a moth of the family Tortricidae. It is found in the Palearctic realm, from western Europe to the Ural Mountains, Transcaucasia, Asia Minor, the Near East, Iran, Russia (Siberia, Central Asia, Cisbaikal, Tuva, the Russian Far East), north-eastern China (Manchuria), Korea and Japan (Hokkaido, Honshu). It is also found in the Nearctic realm.

The wingspan is about 15 mm. The palpi are porrected, the second joint broadly scaled, terminal very short. The forewings with the costa less arched than in Celypha doubledayana (Barrett, 1872) and the termen more oblique. The ground colour is silvery - whitish, strigulated with ochreous, greyish ochreous, reddish, or dark fuscous. The costa is black-marked. The basal patch has the edge angularly indented. The central fascia has two sharp posterior projections. An oblique praetornal spot, and triangular terminal patch are both ochreous or ferruginous, mixed with black or dark fuscous. The hindwings are grey. Julius von Kennel provides a full description.

The moth flies from late May to September in western Europe.

The larvae feed on various herbaceous plants.
