= Phiaris turfosana =

Scientific classification
- Domain: Eukaryota
- Kingdom: Animalia
- Phylum: Arthropoda
- Class: Insecta
- Order: Lepidoptera
- Family: Tortricidae
- Genus: Phiaris
- Species: P. turfosana

Binomial name
- Phiaris turfosana (Herrich-Schäffer, 1851)

Species of moth

Phiaris turfosana is a species of moth belonging to the family Tortricidae.

It is native to Europe and Northern America.
