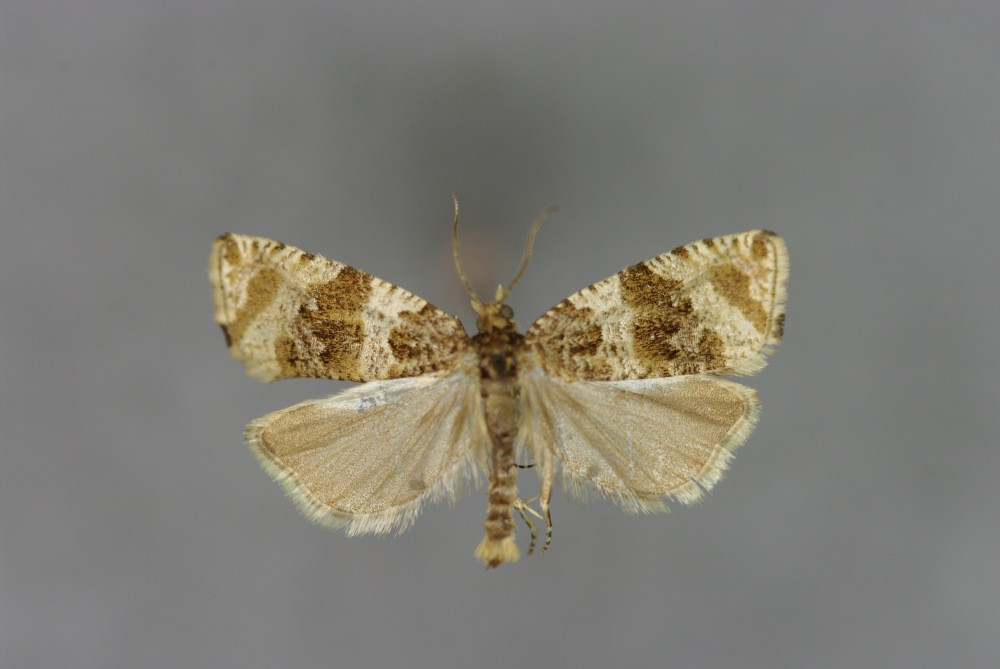
- Phiaris umbrosana

Scientific classification
- Domain: Eukaryota
- Kingdom: Animalia
- Phylum: Arthropoda
- Class: Insecta
- Order: Lepidoptera
- Family: Tortricidae
- Genus: Phiaris
- Species: P. umbrosana

Binomial name
- Phiaris umbrosana (Freyer, 1842)

= Phiaris umbrosana =

Species of moth

Phiaris umbrosana is a species of moth belonging to the family Tortricidae.

It is native to Europe.
