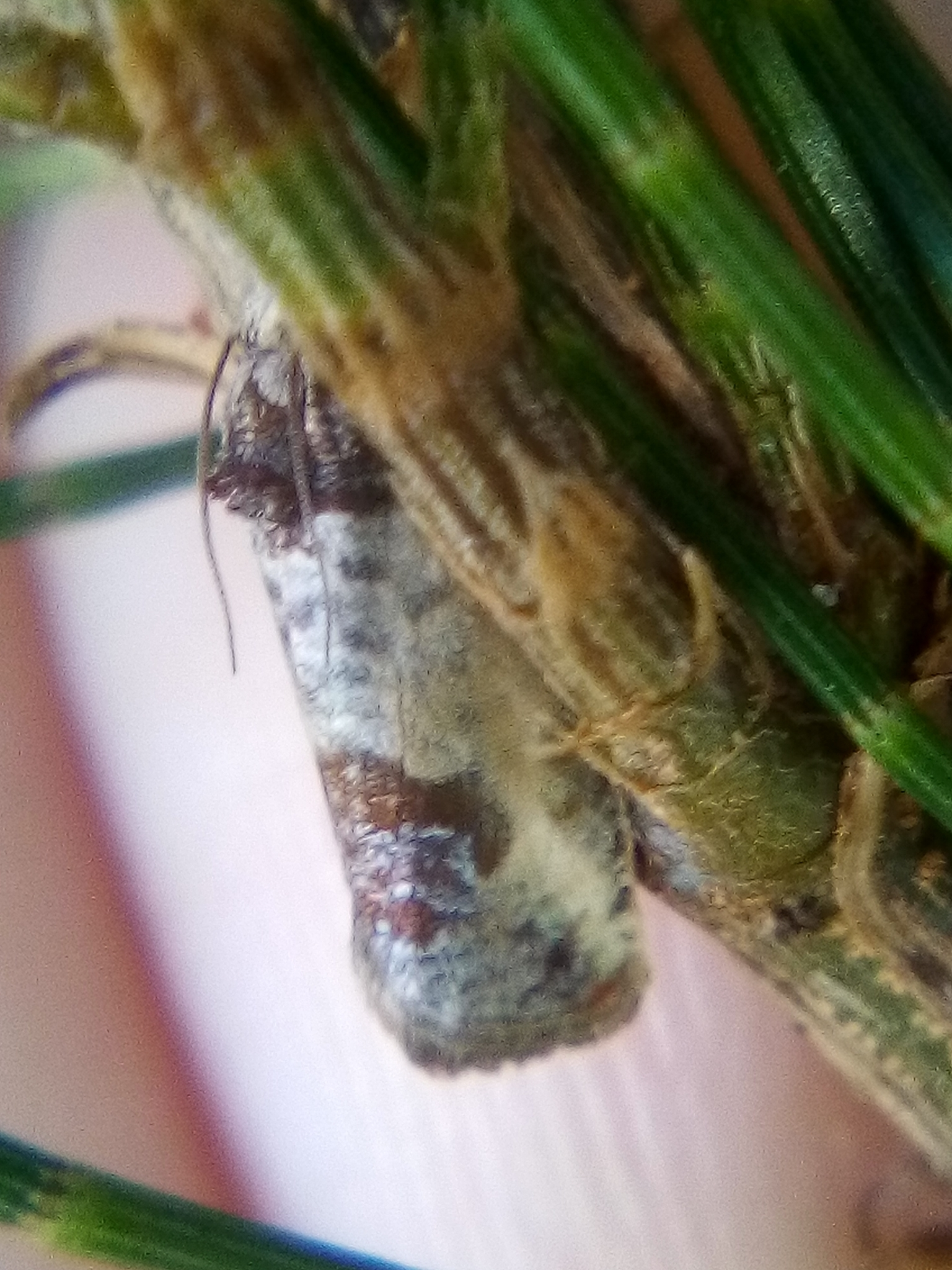

Scientific classification
- Kingdom: Animalia
- Phylum: Arthropoda
- Clade: Pancrustacea
- Class: Insecta
- Order: Lepidoptera
- Family: Tortricidae
- Genus: Argyroploce
- Species: A. chlorosaris

Binomial name
- Argyroploce chlorosaris Meyrick, 1914

= Argyroploce chlorosaris =

Species of moths

Argyroploce chlorosaris is a species of moth in the family Tortricidae. It was first described by Edward Meyrick in 1914. This species is endemic to New Zealand. The classification of this moth within the genus Argyroploce is regarded as unsatisfactory and in need of revision. As such this species is currently also known as Argyroploce (s.l.) chlorosaris.

== Host species ==
The larval host of this species is Metrosideros excelsa. The larve live inside the seeds of this tree.
