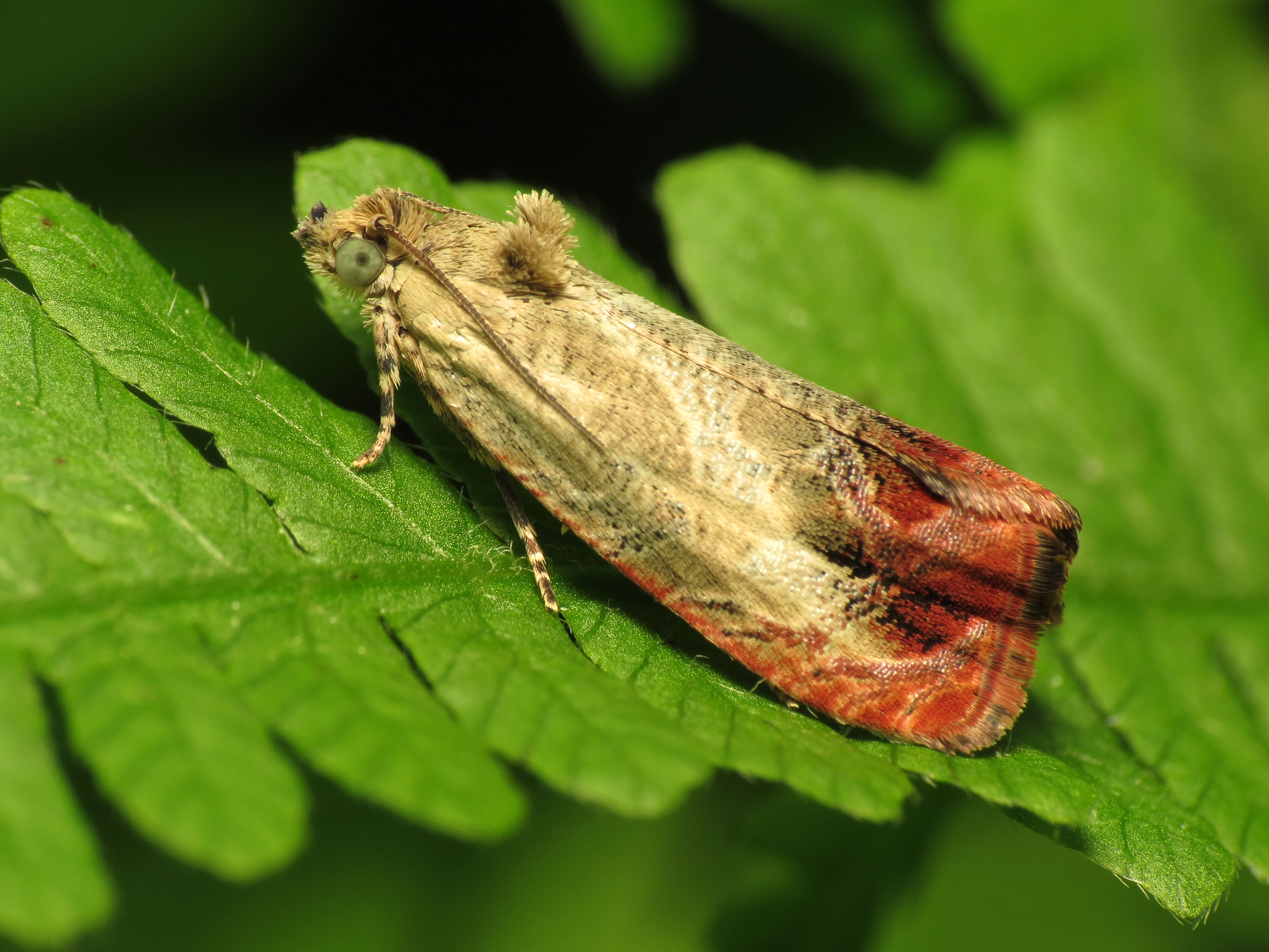

Scientific classification
- Domain: Eukaryota
- Kingdom: Animalia
- Phylum: Arthropoda
- Class: Insecta
- Order: Lepidoptera
- Family: Tortricidae
- Genus: Olethreutes
- Species: O. hamameliana

Binomial name
- Olethreutes hamameliana McDunnough, 1944

= Olethreutes hamameliana =

Species of moth

Olethreutes hamameliana is a species of tortricid moth in the family Tortricidae.

The MONA or Hodges number for Olethreutes hamameliana is 2804.

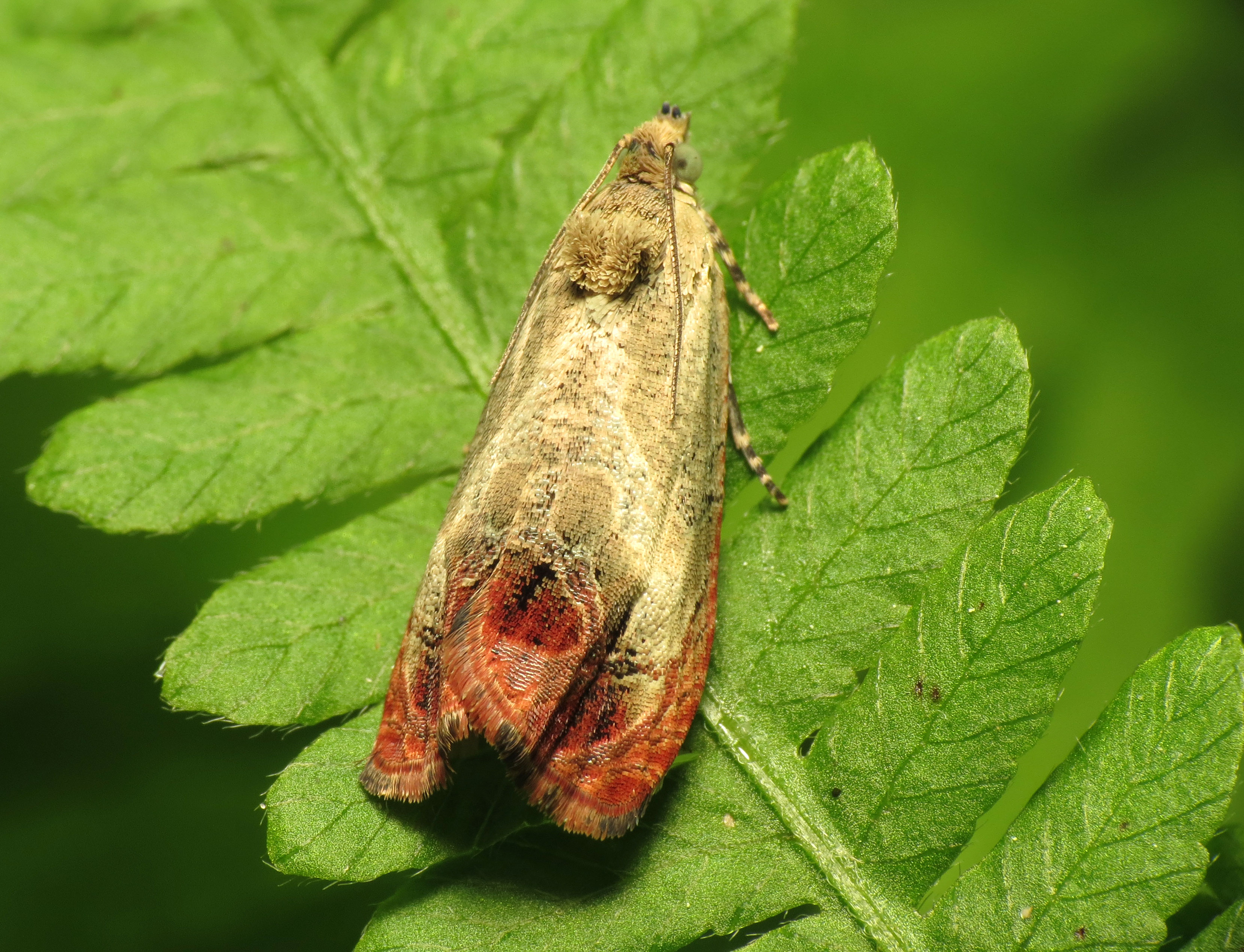
