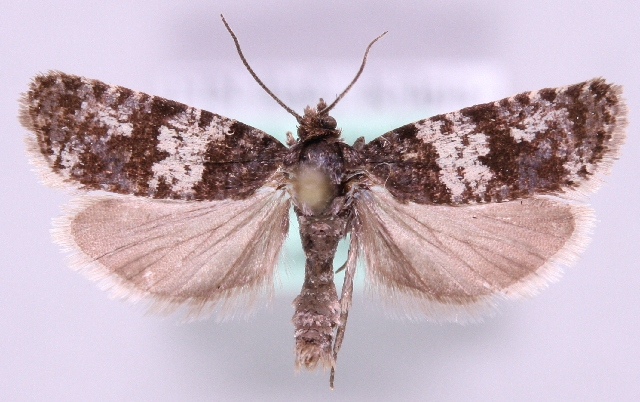

Scientific classification
- Kingdom: Animalia
- Phylum: Arthropoda
- Class: Insecta
- Order: Lepidoptera
- Family: Tortricidae
- Genus: Argyroploce
- Species: A. noricana

Binomial name
- Argyroploce noricana (Herrich-Schäffer, 1851)

Synonyms
- Tortrix (Paedisca) noricana Herrich-Schäffer, 1851; Olethreutes noricanus; Argyroploce noricanus; Argyroploce noricana var. dovreana Barca, 1922; Tortrix (Paedisca) noricana Herrich-Schäffer, 1848

= Argyroploce noricana =

Species of moth

Argyroploce noricana is a moth of the family Tortricidae. It was described by Gottlieb August Wilhelm Herrich-Schäffer in 1851. It is found from Scandinavia and northern Russia south to Italy and from France east to Bulgaria and Romania.

The wingspan is 14–16 mm. Adults are on wing from June to August.

The larvae feed on Dryas octopetala.
