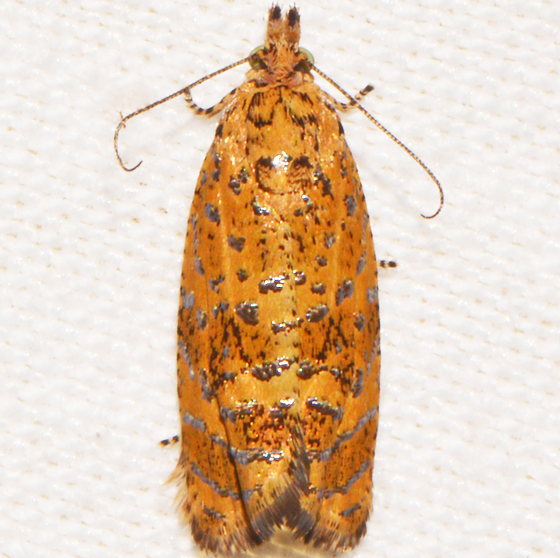

Scientific classification
- Kingdom: Animalia
- Phylum: Arthropoda
- Class: Insecta
- Order: Lepidoptera
- Family: Tortricidae
- Genus: Olethreutes
- Species: O. ferrolineana

Binomial name
- Olethreutes ferrolineana (Walker, 1863)

= Olethreutes ferrolineana =

Species of moth

Olethreutes ferrolineana is a species of tortricid moth in the family Tortricidae.

The MONA or Hodges number for Olethreutes ferrolineana is 2838.1.
