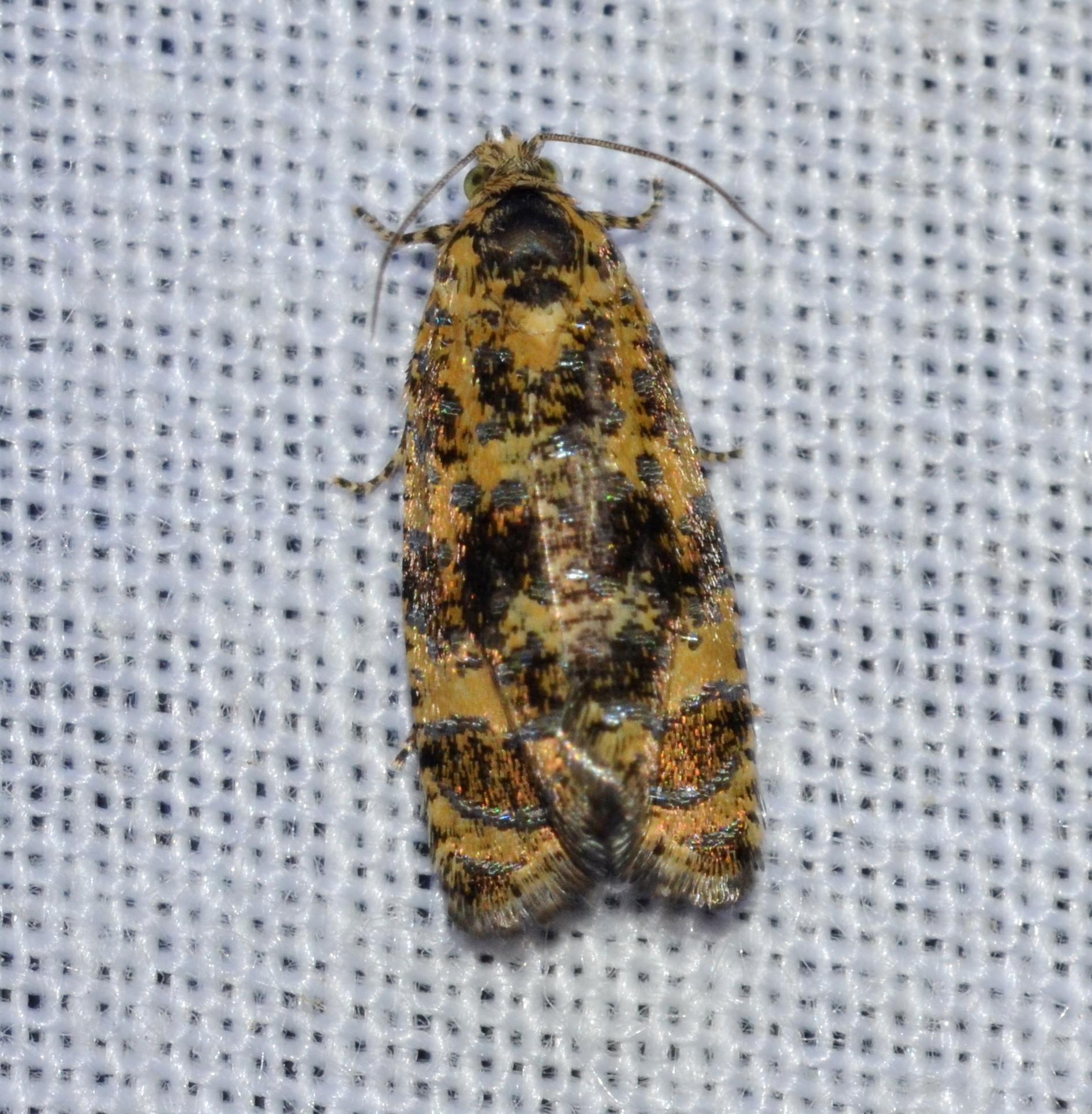

Scientific classification
- Kingdom: Animalia
- Phylum: Arthropoda
- Clade: Pancrustacea
- Class: Insecta
- Order: Lepidoptera
- Family: Tortricidae
- Genus: Olethreutes
- Species: O. coruscana

Binomial name
- Olethreutes coruscana (Clemens, 1860)

Synonyms
- Antithesia coruscana Clemens, 1860; Sericoris constellatana Zeller, 1875; Sericoris puncticostana Walker, 1863

= Olethreutes coruscana =

Species of moth

Olethreutes coruscana is a moth of the family Tortricidae. It is found in North America, where it has been recorded from Alberta, Illinois, Indiana, Iowa, Kansas, Kentucky, Maine, Manitoba, Maryland, Massachusetts, New Hampshire, New Jersey, North Carolina, Ohio, Ontario, Vermont and Virginia.

The wingspan is 14–16 mm. Adults are mainly one wing from May to July.
