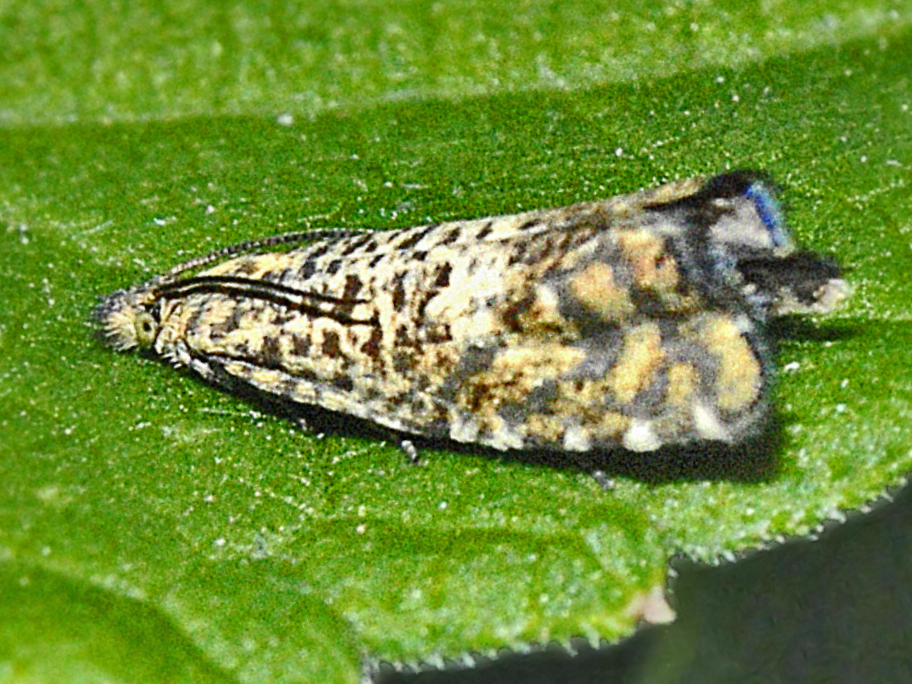

Scientific classification
- Kingdom: Animalia
- Phylum: Arthropoda
- Class: Insecta
- Order: Lepidoptera
- Family: Tortricidae
- Genus: Phiaris
- Species: P. stibiana

Binomial name
- Phiaris stibiana (Guenée, 1845)

Synonyms
- Sericoris stibiana Guenée, 1845; Olethreutes stibiana (Guenée, 1845)

= Phiaris stibiana =

Species of moth

Phiaris stibiana is a species of moth in the family Tortricidae first described by Achille Guenée in 1845. It occurs across most of Europe. It was first formally described in 1845 as Sericoris stibiana.

== Distribution ==
This species is present in most of Europe (Albania, Austria, Bosnia and Herzegovina, Bulgaria, Czech Republic, east European Russia, France, Germany, Greece, Hungary, Italy, North Macedonia, northwest European Russia, Poland, Romania, Slovakia, Slovenia, south European Russia, and former Yugoslavia), in the eastern Palearctic realm, and in the Near East.

== Description ==
Phiaris stibiana can reach a wingspan of about 20 mm (0.79 in). These medium-sized moths show pale brown forewings with dark brown markings and usually some silvery transversal thin stripes. The hindwings are uniformly brown.

== Biology ==
Adults can be found from June to July, while larvae are present in August. They have been observed feeding on Alnus, Prunus, Vaccinium, Teucrium, Viburnum, and Rubus fruticosus.
