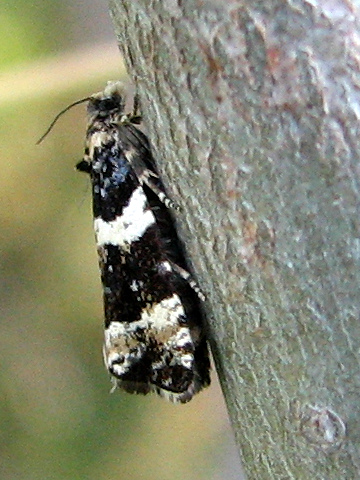

Scientific classification
- Domain: Eukaryota
- Kingdom: Animalia
- Phylum: Arthropoda
- Class: Insecta
- Order: Lepidoptera
- Family: Tortricidae
- Genus: Phiaris
- Species: P. bipunctana

Binomial name
- Phiaris bipunctana (Fabricius, 1794)

Synonyms
- Pyralis bipunctana Fabricius, 1794; Loxoterma bipunctana (Fabricius, 1794); Olethreutes bipunctana (Fabricius, 1794); Olethreutes bipunctana yama Kawabe

= Phiaris bipunctana =

Species of moth

Phiaris bipunctana is a moth of the family Tortricidae. It is found in most of Europe (except Iceland, Ireland, Great Britain, the Iberian Peninsula, Hungary, most of the Balkan Peninsula and Ukraine), east to the eastern part of the Palearctic realm. It was recently discovered in Canada (Manitoba).

The wingspan is 17–20 mm. Adults are on wing from April to August in one generation.

The larvae feed on Vaccinium myrtillus, Vaccinium vitis-idaea, Rhododendron and Pyrola. They spin the leaves of their host together and feed inside.
