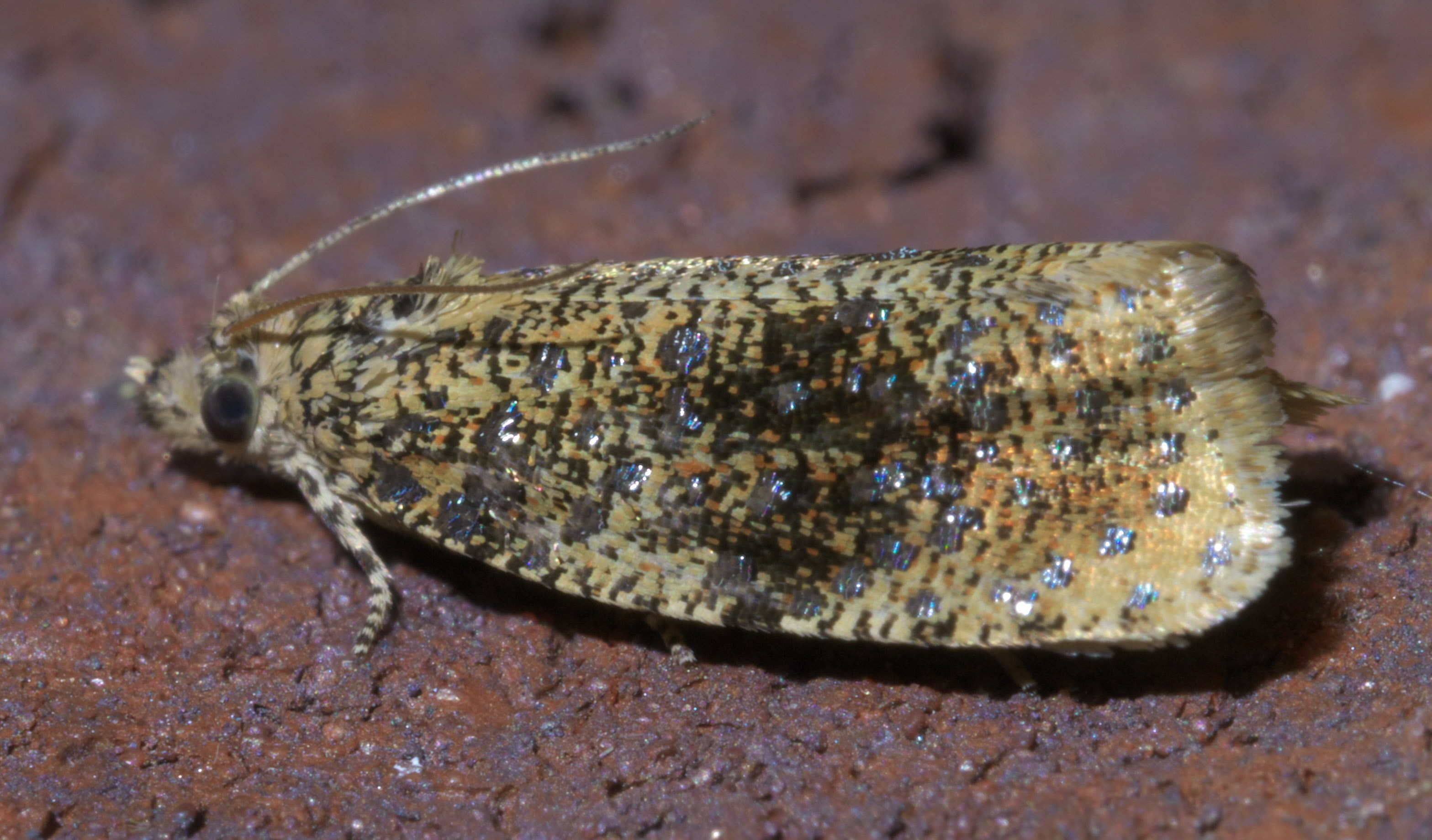

Scientific classification
- Kingdom: Animalia
- Phylum: Arthropoda
- Clade: Pancrustacea
- Class: Insecta
- Order: Lepidoptera
- Family: Tortricidae
- Genus: Olethreutes
- Species: O. astrologana

Binomial name
- Olethreutes astrologana (Zeller, 1875)

= Olethreutes astrologana =

Species of moth

Olethreutes astrologana, commonly known as the astronomer, is a species of tortricid moth in the family Tortricidae.

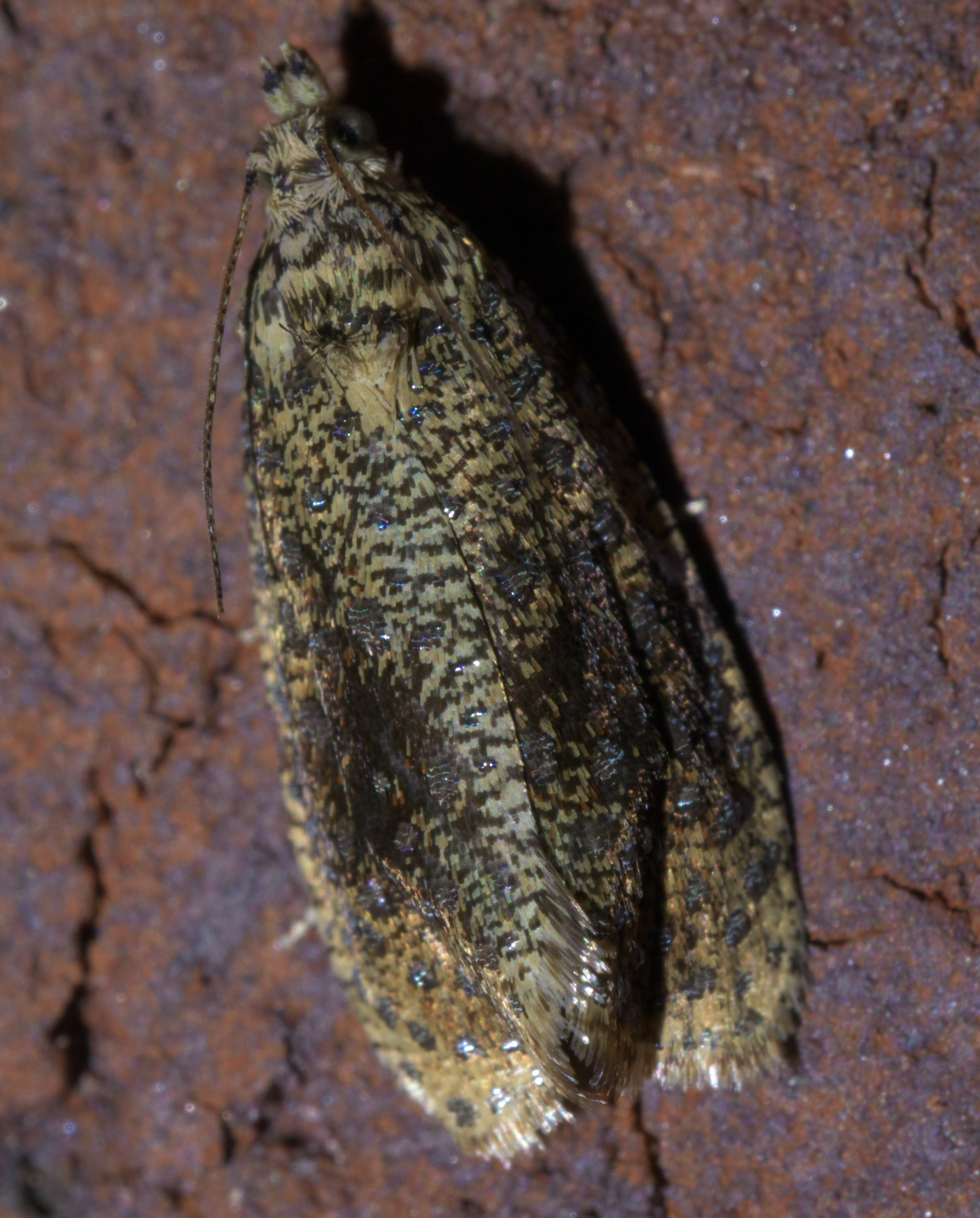
The astronomer, Olethreutes astrologana
