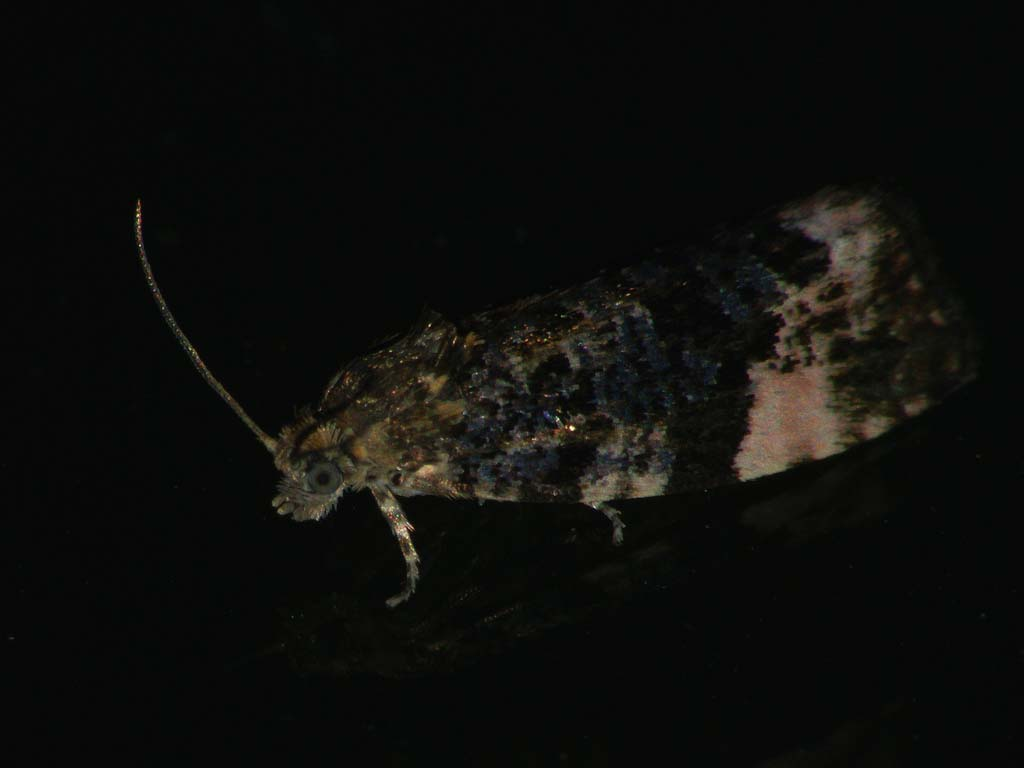

Scientific classification
- Domain: Eukaryota
- Kingdom: Animalia
- Phylum: Arthropoda
- Class: Insecta
- Order: Lepidoptera
- Family: Tortricidae
- Genus: Argyroploce
- Species: A. roseomaculana

Binomial name
- Argyroploce roseomaculana (Denis & Schiffermüller, 1775)

Synonyms
- Tortrix roseomaculana [Denis & Schiffermüller], 1775

= Argyroploce roseomaculana =

Species of moth

Argyroploce roseomaculana is a moth of the family Tortricidae. It was described by Gottlieb August Wilhelm Herrich-Schäffer in 1775. It is found from Scandinavia south to Italy and Romania and from Poland and the Czech Republic east to Russia.

The wingspan is 15–18 mm. Adults are on wing from May to August.

The larvae feed on Pyrola secunda.
