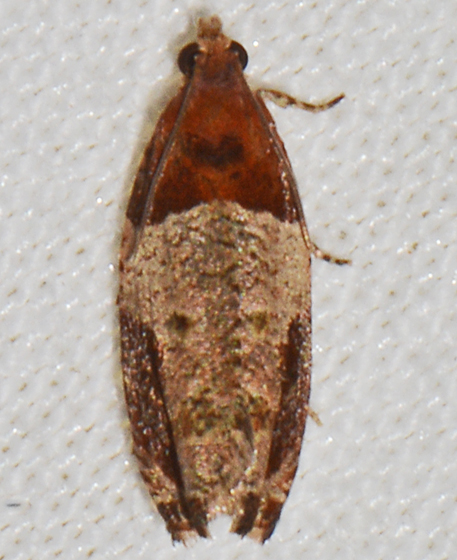

Scientific classification
- Kingdom: Animalia
- Phylum: Arthropoda
- Clade: Pancrustacea
- Class: Insecta
- Order: Lepidoptera
- Family: Tortricidae
- Genus: Olethreutes
- Species: O. ferriferana

Binomial name
- Olethreutes ferriferana Walker, 1863

= Olethreutes ferriferana =

Species of moth

Olethreutes ferriferana, the hydrangea leaftier, is a species of tortricid moth in the family Tortricidae. It is native to eastern North America, from Maine to North Carolina, west to Kentucky, and Texas.

The MONA or Hodges number for Olethreutes ferriferana is 2827.

Hydrangea is the host plant for this species, and caterpillars use a silk to tie developing leaves together, hence the common name. The slightly transparent green caterpillars live inside of this structure, which can superficially resemble a plant gall, because of the way it distorts the plant growth. This does not significantly damage the plant, though it may be managed for aesthetic concerns. Physical removal, rather than pesticides, are the best management technique as caterpillars are protected from pesticides inside of the leaf structure.
