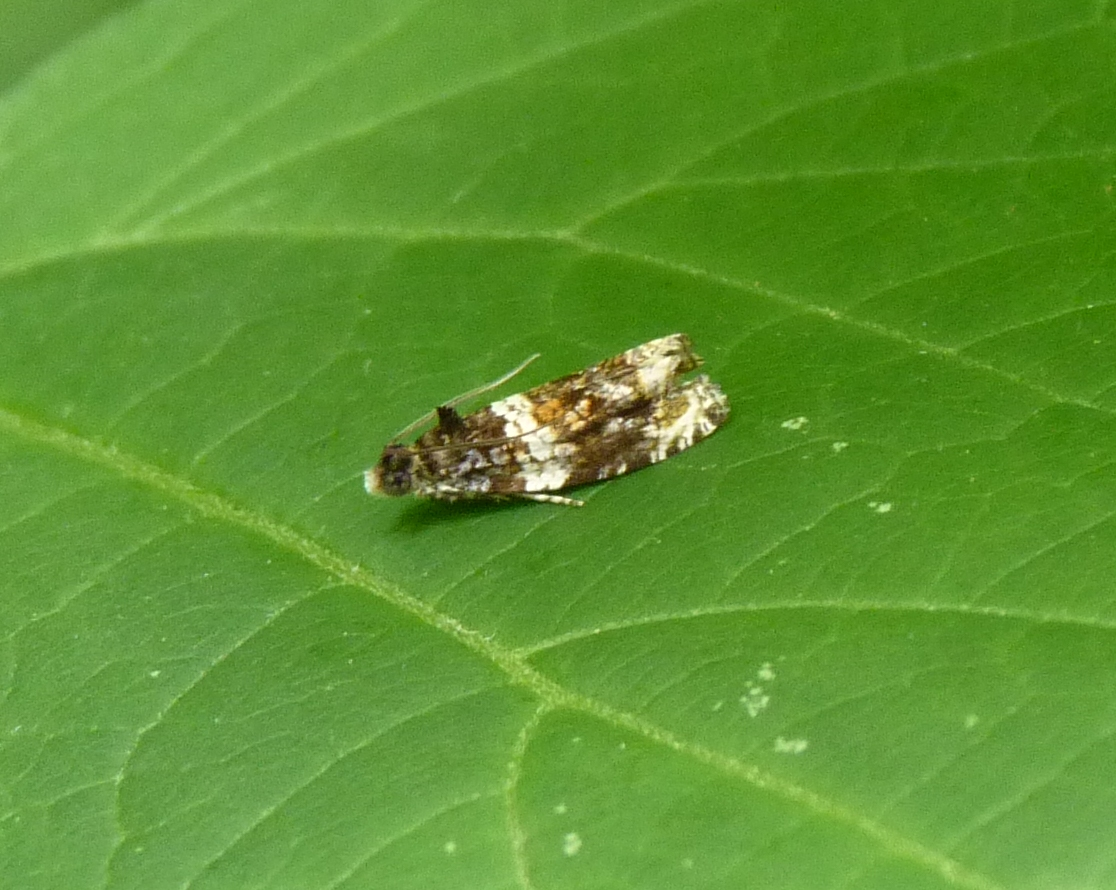

Scientific classification
- Kingdom: Animalia
- Phylum: Arthropoda
- Clade: Pancrustacea
- Class: Insecta
- Order: Lepidoptera
- Family: Tortricidae
- Genus: Olethreutes
- Species: O. fasciatana

Binomial name
- Olethreutes fasciatana (Clemens, 1860)

Synonyms
- Exartema fasciatana Clemens, 1860; Exartema albofasciata Zeller, 1875; Sciaphila decisana Walker, 1862

= Olethreutes fasciatana =

Species of moth

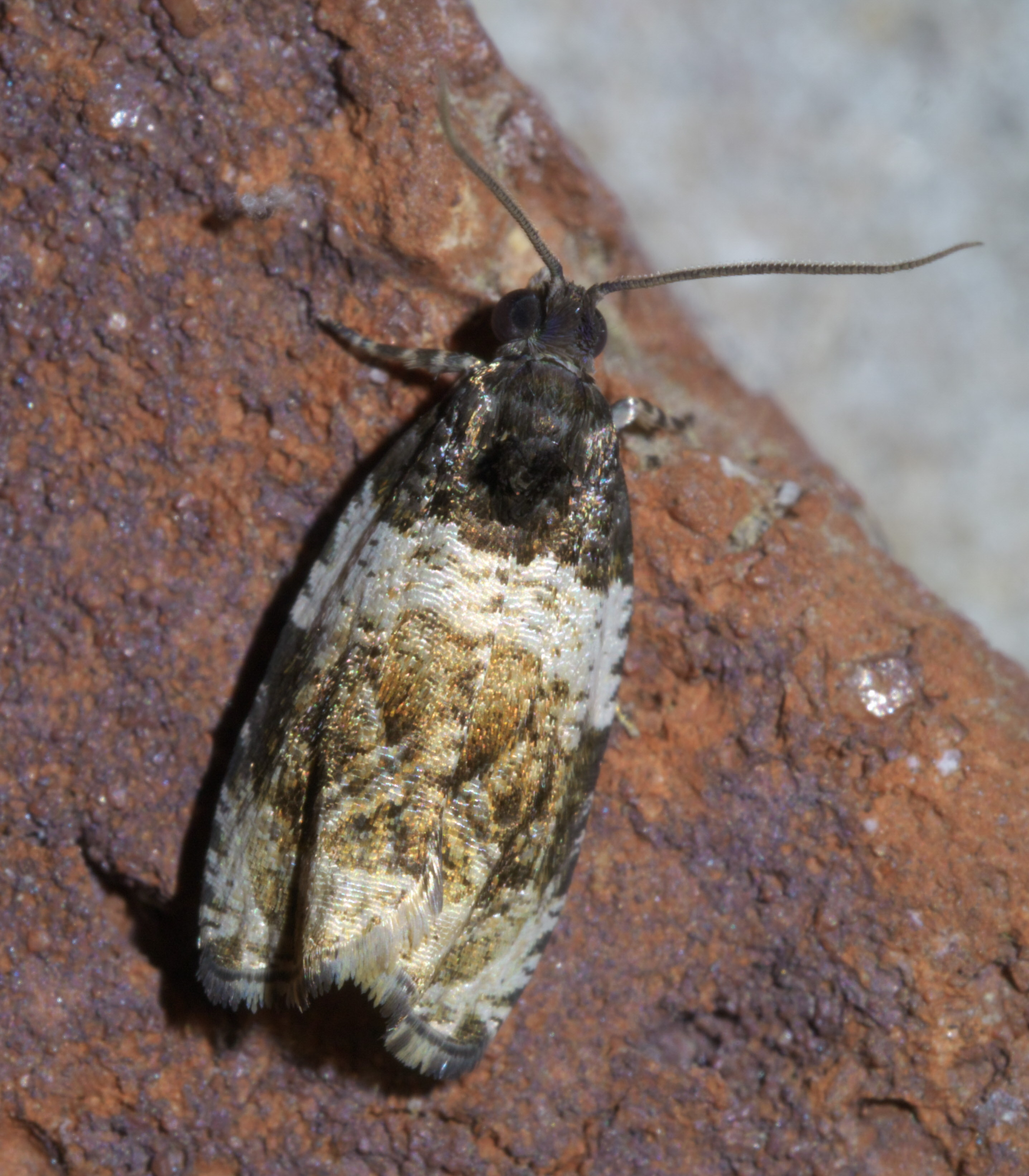
Olethreutes fasciatana, banded olethreutes, size: 8.2 mm

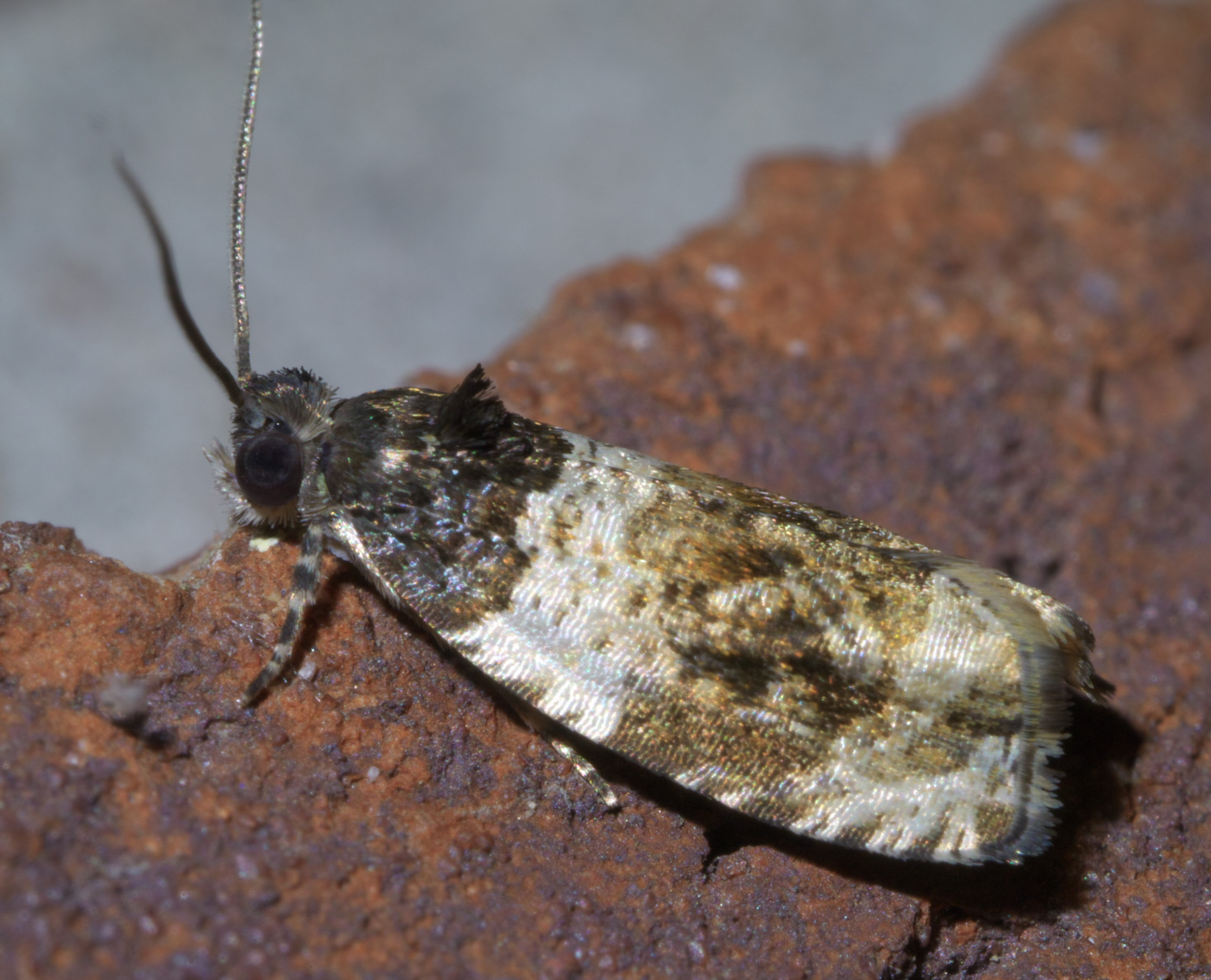
Olethreutes fasciatana, banded olethreutes, size: 8.2 mm

Olethreutes fasciatana is a moth of the family Tortricidae. It is known from North America, including Alabama, Illinois, Maryland, Massachusetts, New Jersey, New York, North Carolina, Ohio, Oklahoma, Pennsylvania and Wisconsin.

The wingspan is about 15 mm. Adults have been recorded in June.

The larvae feed on Salix and Populus species.
