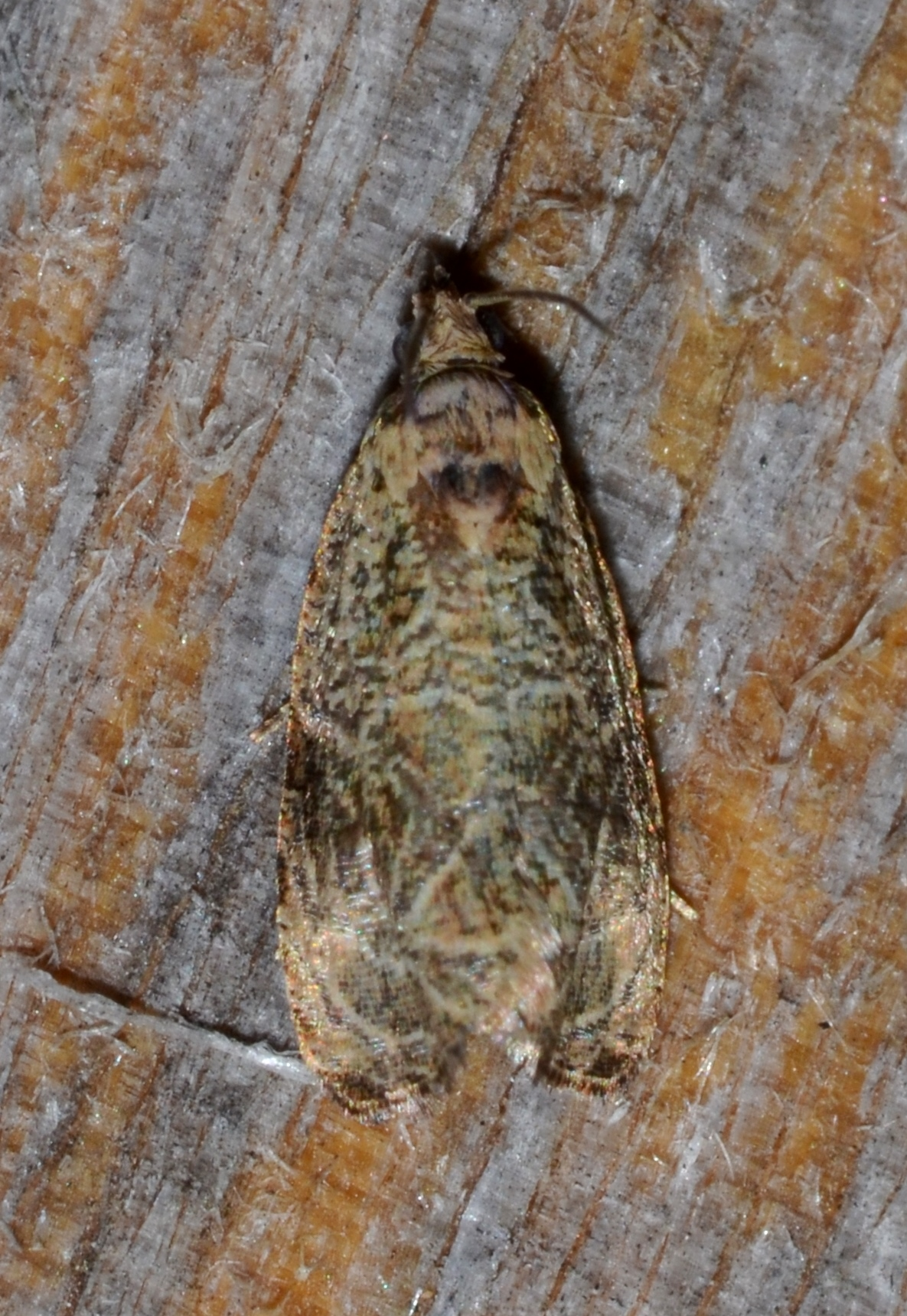

Scientific classification
- Domain: Eukaryota
- Kingdom: Animalia
- Phylum: Arthropoda
- Class: Insecta
- Order: Lepidoptera
- Family: Tortricidae
- Genus: Olethreutes
- Species: O. furfuranum

Binomial name
- Olethreutes furfuranum McDunnough, 1922

= Olethreutes furfuranum =

Species of moth

Olethreutes furfuranum, the woolly-backed moth, is a species of moth in the family Tortricidae, found across eastern North America.

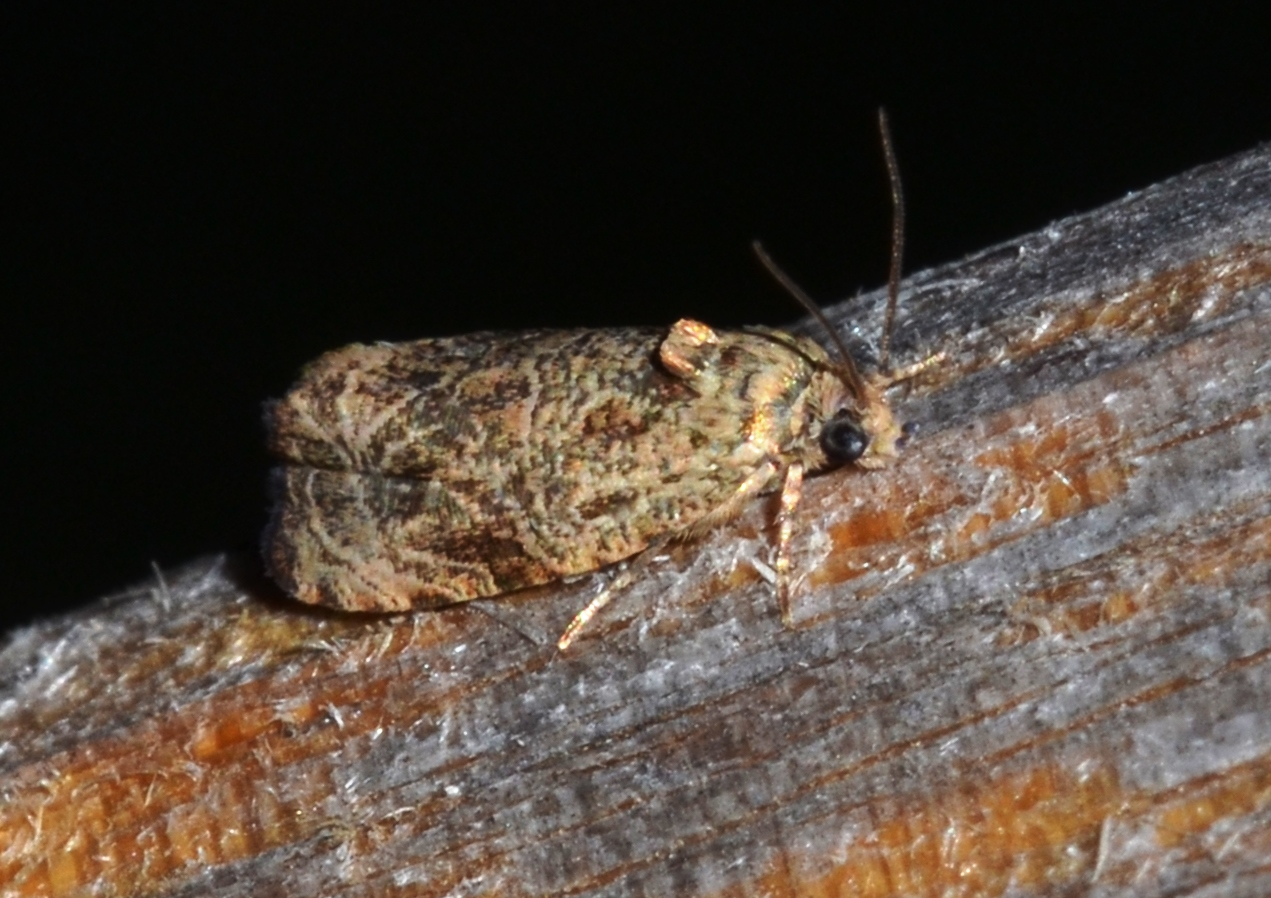
Woolly-backed moth, Olethreutes furfuranum
