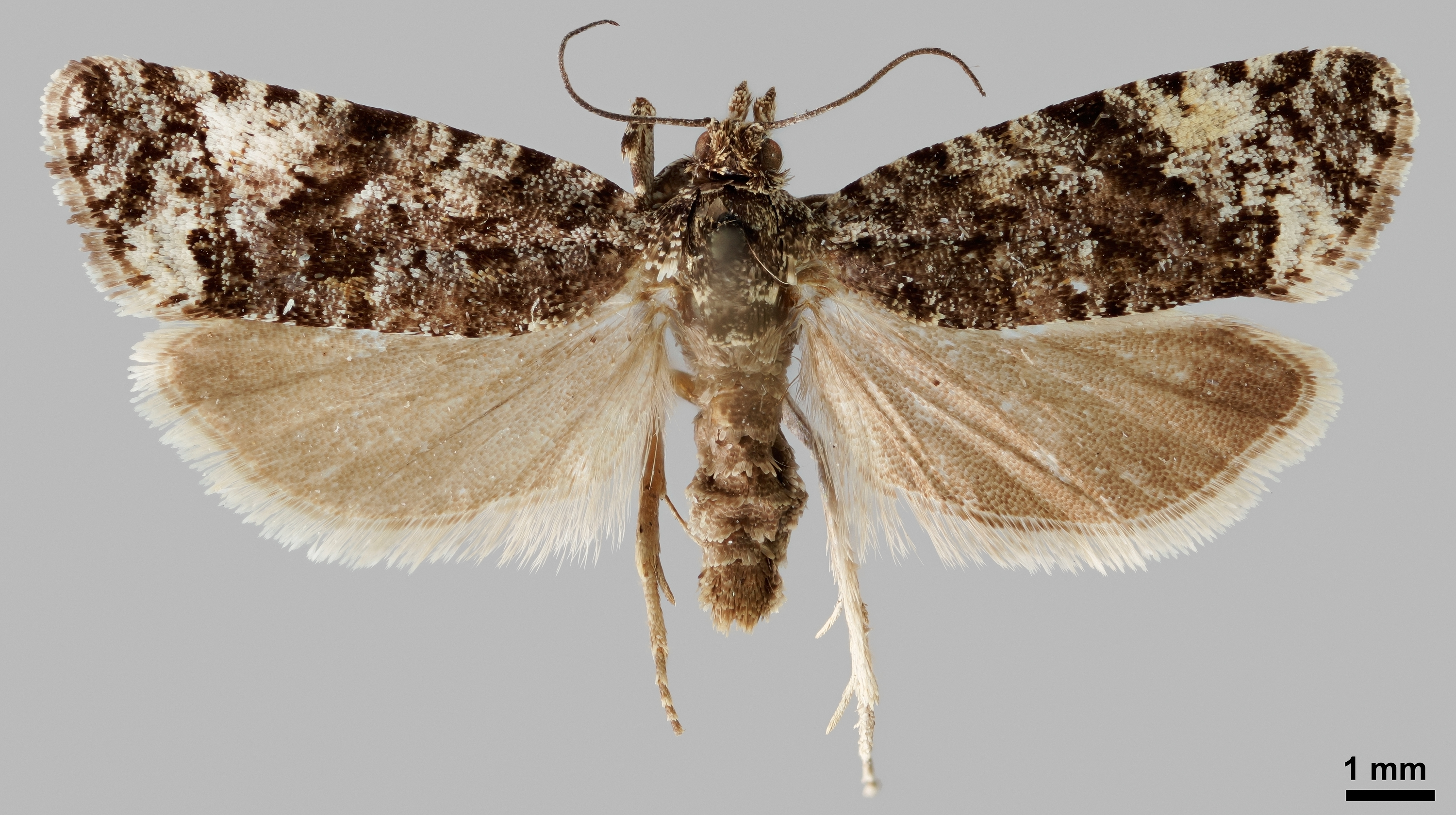

Scientific classification
- Domain: Eukaryota
- Kingdom: Animalia
- Phylum: Arthropoda
- Class: Insecta
- Order: Lepidoptera
- Family: Tortricidae
- Genus: Argyroploce
- Species: A. aquilonana

Binomial name
- Argyroploce aquilonana Karvonen, 1932

= Argyroploce aquilonana =

Species of butterfly

Argyroploce aquilonana is a species of moth belonging to the family Tortricidae.

It is native to Northern Europe and Northern America.
