= Phiaris metallicana =

Scientific classification
- Kingdom: Animalia
- Phylum: Arthropoda
- Class: Insecta
- Order: Lepidoptera
- Family: Tortricidae
- Genus: Phiaris
- Species: P. metallicana

Binomial name
- Phiaris metallicana (Hubner, 1799)

Species of moth

Phiaris metallicana is a species of moth belonging to the family Tortricidae.

It is native to Eurasia and Northern America.
