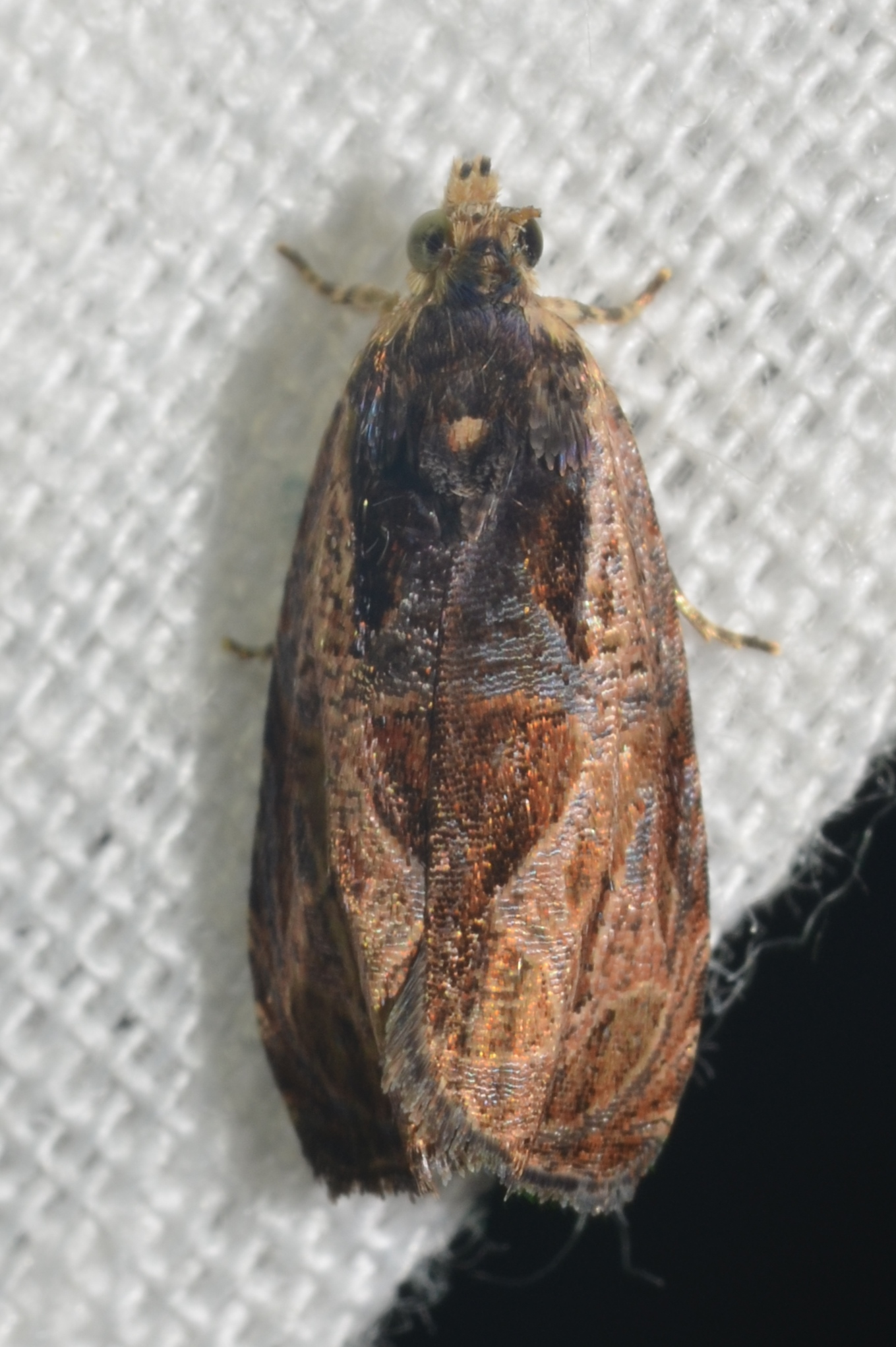

Scientific classification
- Domain: Eukaryota
- Kingdom: Animalia
- Phylum: Arthropoda
- Class: Insecta
- Order: Lepidoptera
- Family: Tortricidae
- Genus: Olethreutes
- Species: O. nigranum

Binomial name
- Olethreutes nigranum Heinrich, 1923

= Olethreutes nigranum =

Species of moth

Olethreutes nigranum, the variable nigranum, is a species of tortricid moth in the family Tortricidae.

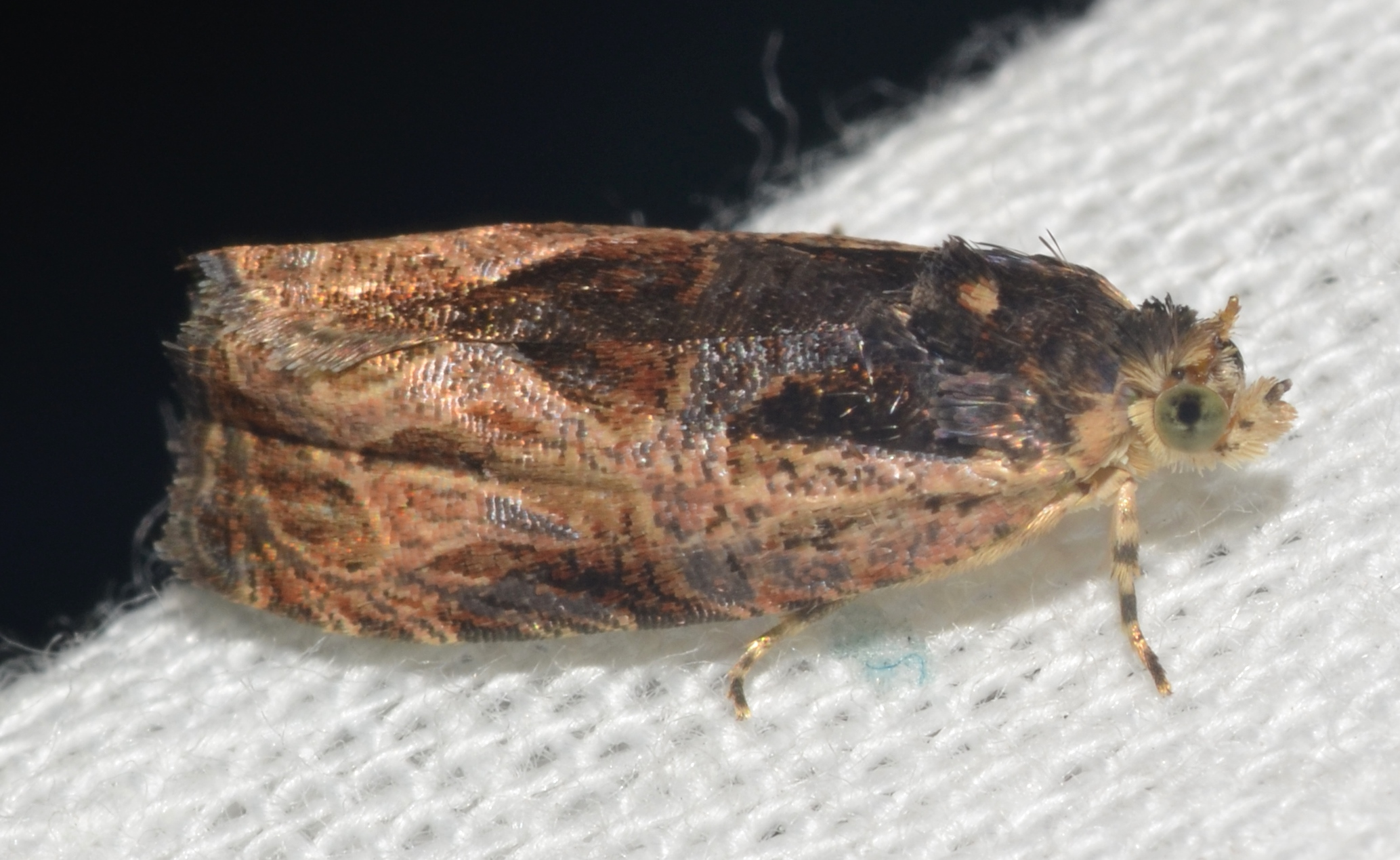
Variable nigranum, Olethreutes nigranum
