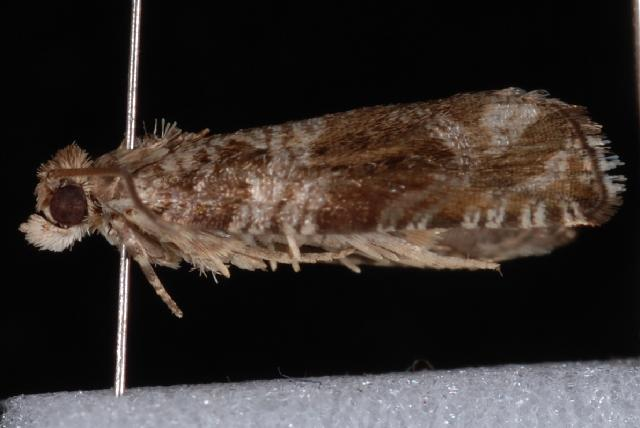

Scientific classification
- Kingdom: Animalia
- Phylum: Arthropoda
- Clade: Pancrustacea
- Class: Insecta
- Order: Lepidoptera
- Family: Tortricidae
- Genus: Olethreutes
- Species: O. appendiceum

Binomial name
- Olethreutes appendiceum (Zeller, 1875)

= Olethreutes appendiceum =

Species of moth

Olethreutes appendiceum, the serviceberry leafroller, is a species of tortricid moth in the family Tortricidae.

The MONA or Hodges number for Olethreutes appendiceum is 2821.
