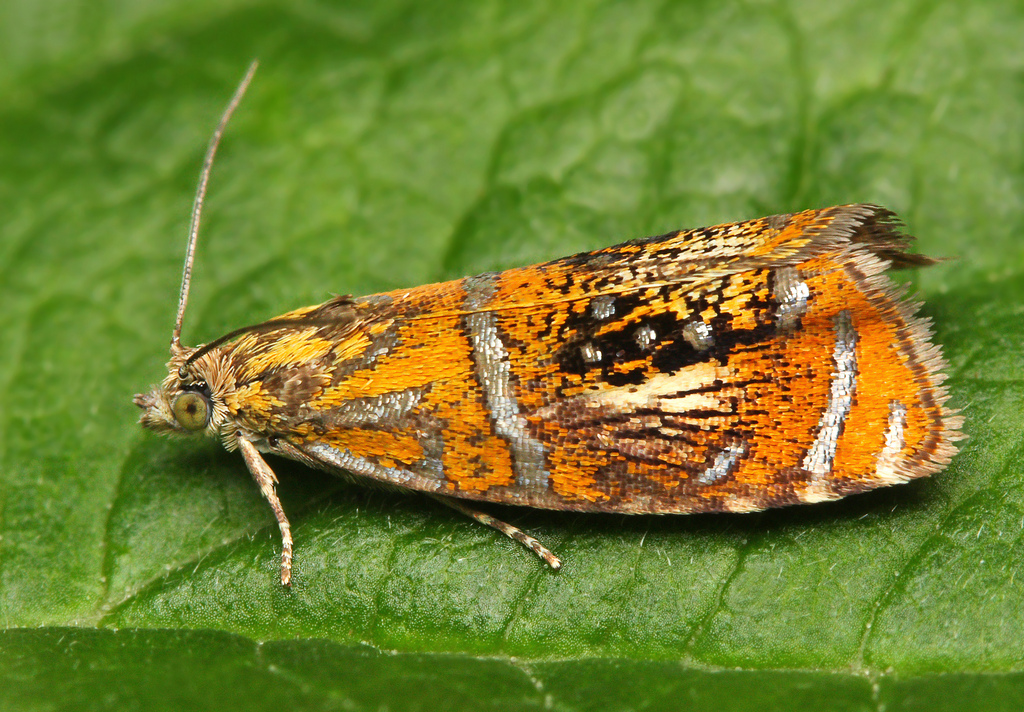
- Adult

Scientific classification
- Kingdom: Animalia
- Phylum: Arthropoda
- Clade: Pancrustacea
- Class: Insecta
- Order: Lepidoptera
- Family: Tortricidae
- Genus: Olethreutes
- Species: O. arcuella

Binomial name
- Olethreutes arcuella (Clerck, 1759)

Synonyms
- Several, see text

= Olethreutes arcuella =

Species of moth

Olethreutes arcuella, the arched marble, is a colorful small moth species of the family Tortricidae.

== Synonyms ==
Junior synonyms of this species are:

- Olethreutes arcuellus (lapsus)
- Phalaena arcuana Linnaeus, 1761
- Phalaena arcuella Clerck, 1759
- Phalaena lambergiana Scopoli, 1763
- Tortrix arcuana (Linnaeus, 1761)

== Distribution ==
This species can be found in most of Europe, in the eastern Palearctic realm, and in the Near East.

== Habitat ==
These moths inhabit woodland, fields, hill pasture and heaths.

== Description ==
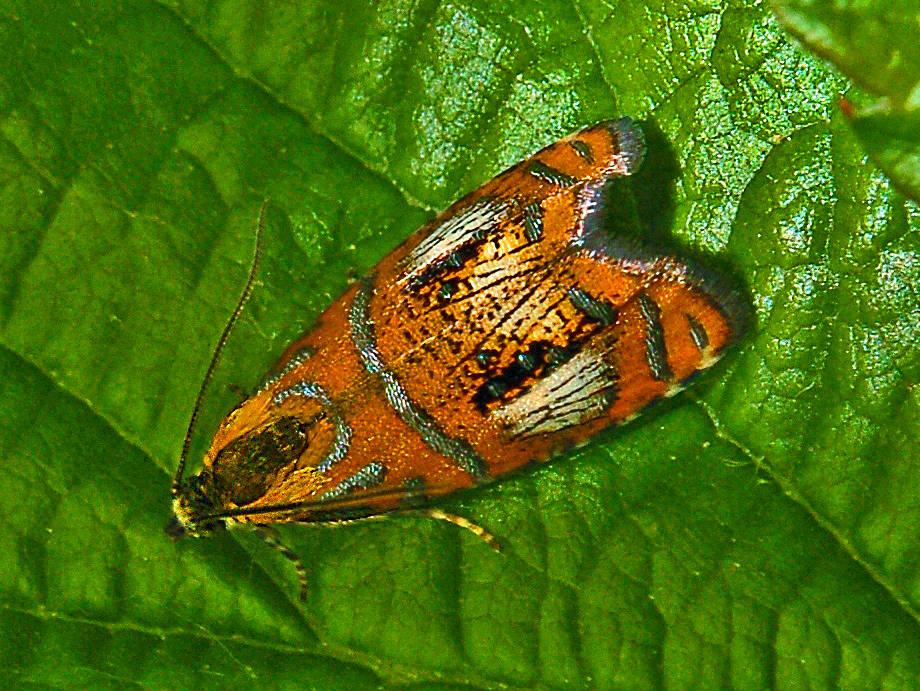
Olethreutes arcuella. Upperside

Olethreutes arcuella has a wingspan of 14–18 mm. Forewings of these medium size moths have an orange-rufous ground colour, with some yellow patches, a few metallic blue-grey or silver-colored streaks and a wide black marking in the middle, which includes a row of three small, silver colored spots. The hindwings are brown. The caterpillars are purplish- gray to violet-brown and have a yellowish-brown head.

This species is quite similar to Olethreutes subtilana, but has rather narrower wings.

== Biology ==
This species usually has one generation (univoltine). The flight time of these day-active moths ranges between late May and August. The caterpillars feed on dead and dried out leaves and similar plant material. Also pupation takes place in plant debris.

== Bibliography ==
- Baixeras, J.; Brown, J.W. & Gilligan, T.M. (2009): Online World Catalogue of the Tortricidae – Olethreutes arcuella. Version 1.3.1. Retrieved 2010-APR-19.
- Savela, Markku (2005): Markku Savela's Lepidoptera and some other life forms – Olethreutes arcuellus [sic]. Version of 2005-SEP-16. Retrieved 2010-APR-19.
- Grabe, Albert (1942): Eigenartige Geschmacksrichtungen bei Kleinschmetterlingsraupen ["Strange tastes among micromoth caterpillars"]. Zeitschrift des Wiener Entomologen-Vereins 27: 105-109 [in German]. PDF fulltext
