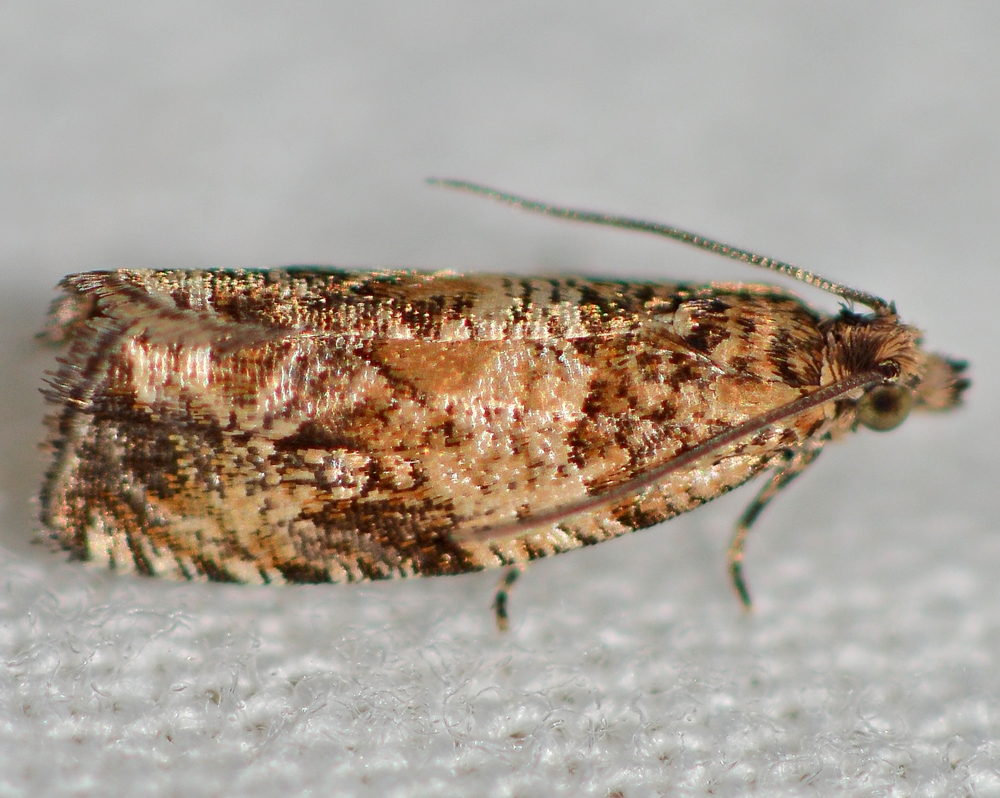

Scientific classification
- Kingdom: Animalia
- Phylum: Arthropoda
- Class: Insecta
- Order: Lepidoptera
- Family: Tortricidae
- Genus: Olethreutes
- Species: O. valdanum

Binomial name
- Olethreutes valdanum McDunnough, 1922

= Olethreutes valdanum =

Species of moth

Olethreutes valdanum is a species of tortricid moth in the family Tortricidae.
