= Olethreutes orthocosma =

Scientific classification
- Kingdom: Animalia
- Phylum: Arthropoda
- Class: Insecta
- Order: Lepidoptera
- Family: Tortricidae
- Genus: Olethreutes
- Species: O. orthocosma

Binomial name
- Olethreutes orthocosma (Meyrick, 1931)

Synonyms
- Argyroploce orthocosma Meyrick, 1931; Celypha orthocosma

Species of moth

Olethreutes orthocosma is a moth of the family Tortricidae. It is found in China, Korea, Japan, Taiwan and the Russian Far East.

The wingspan is 13.0–15.5 mm.

The larvae are probably omnivorous.
