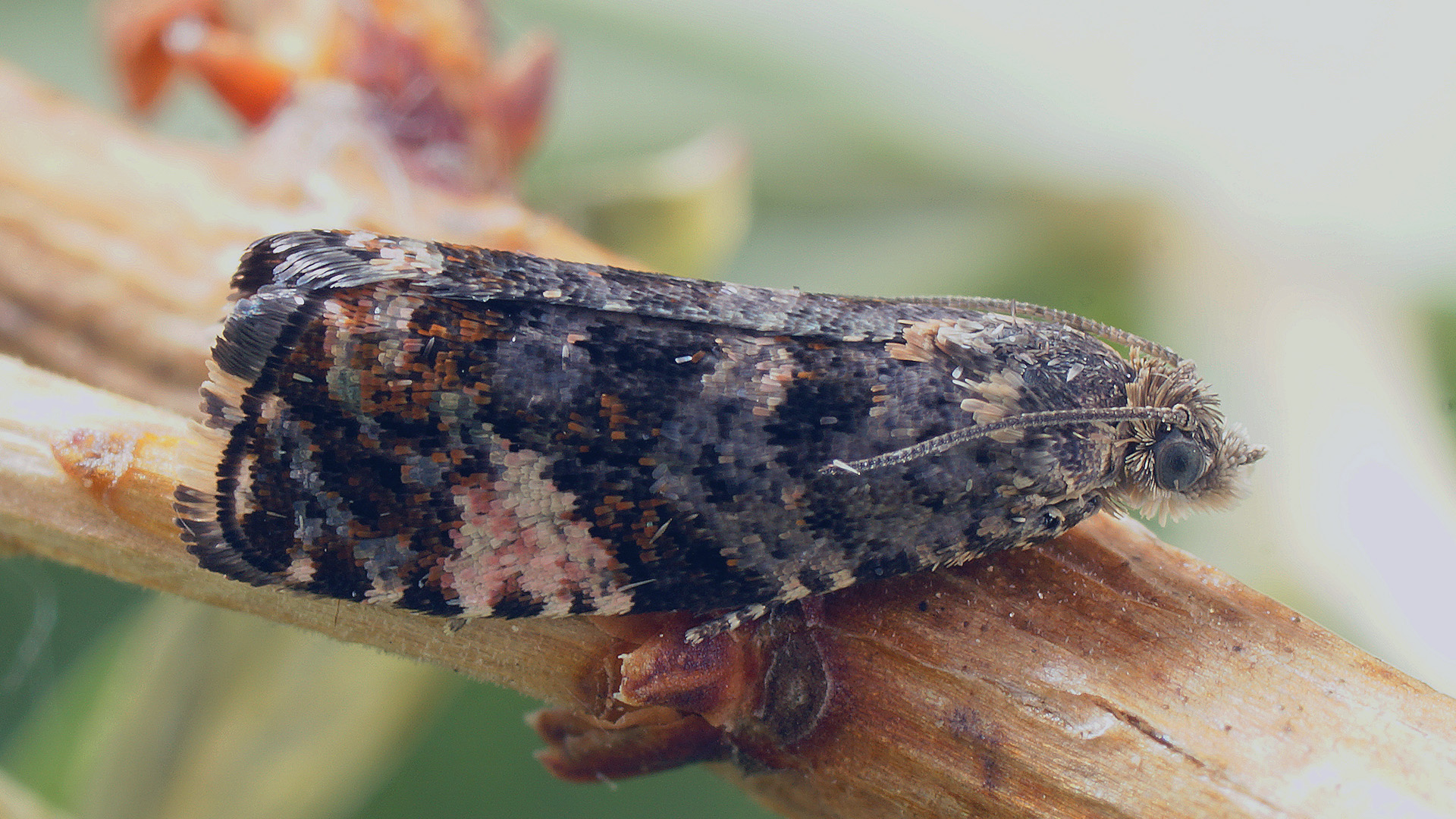

Scientific classification
- Kingdom: Animalia
- Phylum: Arthropoda
- Class: Insecta
- Order: Lepidoptera
- Family: Tortricidae
- Genus: Argyroploce
- Species: A. lediana

Binomial name
- Argyroploce lediana (Linnaeus, 1758)

Synonyms
- Phalaena (Tortrix) lediana Linnaeus, 1758; Olethreutes ledianus; Argyroploce ledianus; Penthina lienigiana Lienig & Zeller, 1846; Argyroploce szmyti Toll, 1957; Conchylis westwoodana Zetterstedt, 1839

= Argyroploce lediana =

Species of moth

Argyroploce lediana is a moth of the family Tortricidae. It was described by Carl Linnaeus in 1758. It is found in Scandinavia, northern Russia, the Baltic region, Germany, Poland, the Czech Republic, Slovakia, Austria and Romania. In the east, the range extends to Japan.

The wingspan is 12–16 mm. Adults are on wing from June to July.

The larvae feed on Ledum palustre.
