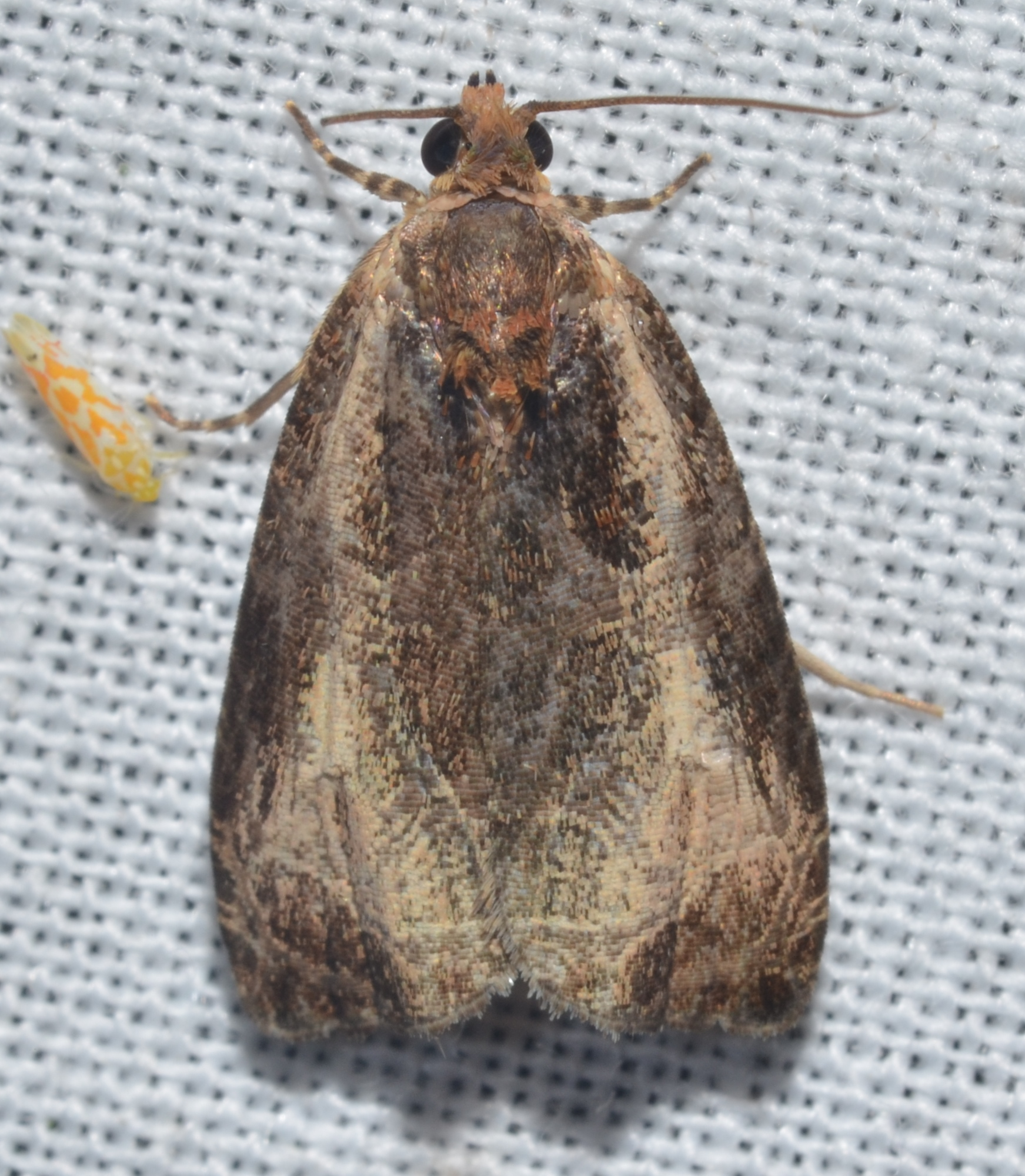

Scientific classification
- Kingdom: Animalia
- Phylum: Arthropoda
- Clade: Pancrustacea
- Class: Insecta
- Order: Lepidoptera
- Family: Tortricidae
- Genus: Olethreutes
- Species: O. inornatana

Binomial name
- Olethreutes inornatana Clemens, 1860

= Olethreutes inornatana =

Species of moth

Olethreutes inornatana, the inornate olethreute, is a species of tortricid moth in the family Tortricidae.

The MONA or Hodges number for Olethreutes inornatana is 2788.
