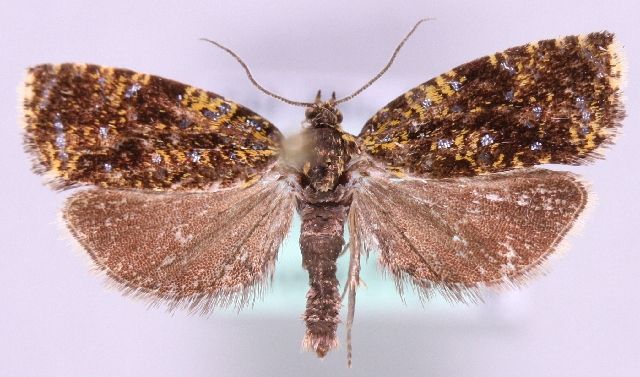

Scientific classification
- Domain: Eukaryota
- Kingdom: Animalia
- Phylum: Arthropoda
- Class: Insecta
- Order: Lepidoptera
- Family: Tortricidae
- Genus: Phiaris
- Species: P. siderana

Binomial name
- Phiaris siderana (Treitschke, 1835)

Synonyms
- Sericoris siderana Treitschke, 1835; Celypha siderana; Argyroploce siderana aurana Caradja, 1939; Sericoris chalybeana Walsingham, 1879; Argyroploce notata Walsingham, 1900

= Phiaris siderana =

Species of moth

Phiaris siderana is a moth of the family Tortricidae. It was described by Georg Friedrich Treitschke in 1835. It is found from Scandinavia south to Italy and Hungary and from France east to Russia.

The larvae feed on Spirea, Aruncus and Filipendula species.
