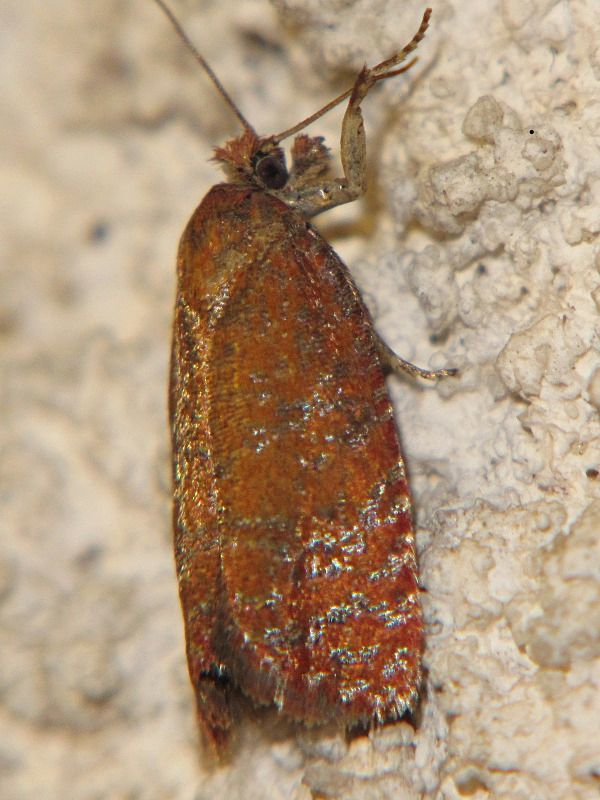

Scientific classification
- Kingdom: Animalia
- Phylum: Arthropoda
- Clade: Pancrustacea
- Class: Insecta
- Order: Lepidoptera
- Family: Tortricidae
- Genus: Argyroploce
- Species: A. arbutella

Binomial name
- Argyroploce arbutella (Linnaeus, 1758)

Synonyms
- Phalaena (Tinea) arbutella Linnaeus, 1758; Penthina arbutella; Olethreutes arbutella; Tortrix arbutana Hubner, [1811-1813]; Penthina arbutella var. furiosella Kennel, 1901

= Argyroploce arbutella =

Species of moth

Argyroploce arbutella is a moth of the family Tortricidae. It is found in most of Europe, from Fennoscandia and northern Russia to the Pyrenees, Sardinia, Italy and Bulgaria and from Ireland to Poland and Romania.

The wingspan is 13–15 mm.

The head and thorax fuscous, crimson-tinged. Forewings reddish-ferruginous, irregularly striated with leaden-grey or silver grey. The hindwings are grey. The larva is blackish-grey. Julius von Kennel provides a full description.

They are on wing from May to June. Larvae can be found from April to May.
