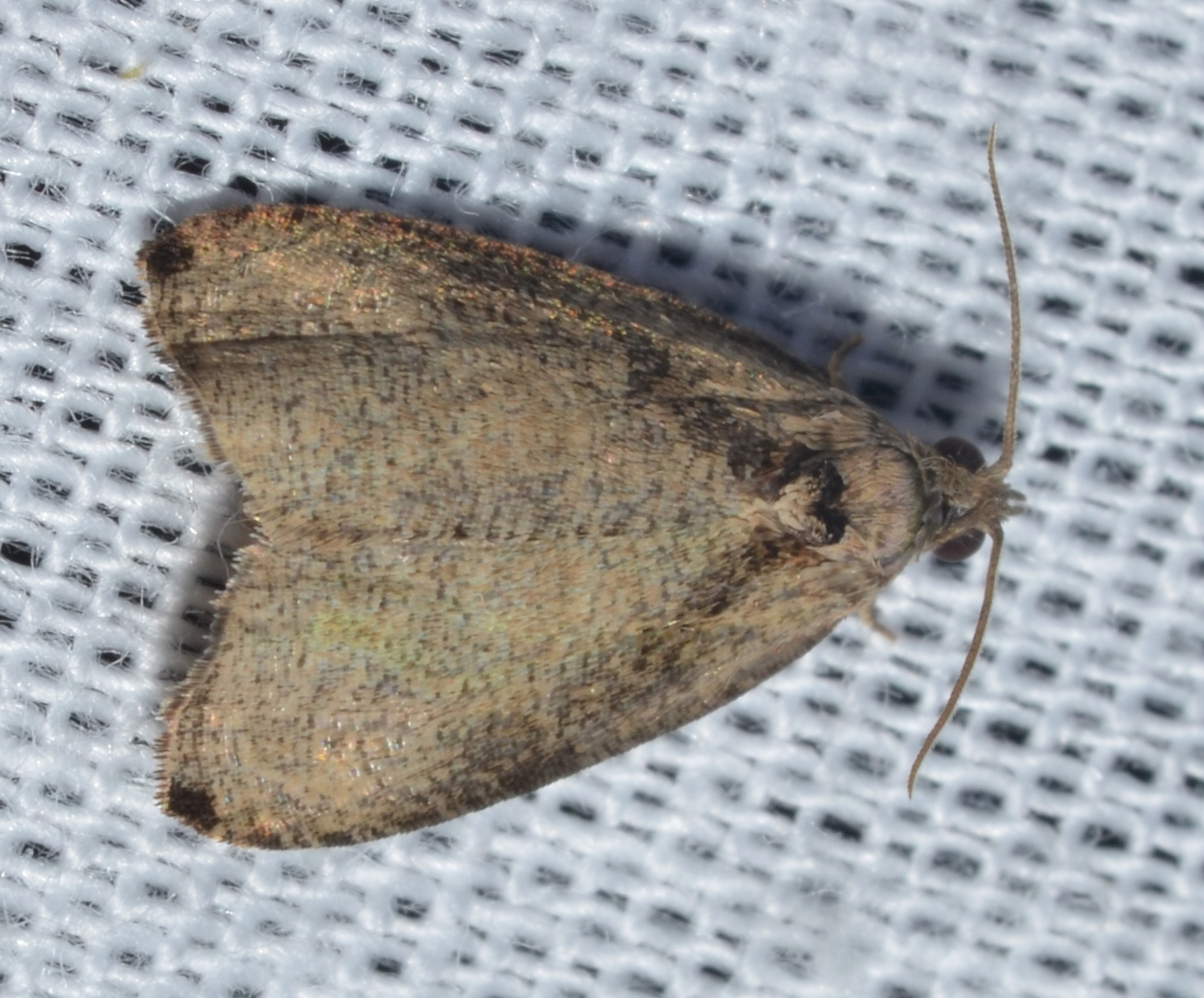

Scientific classification
- Kingdom: Animalia
- Phylum: Arthropoda
- Clade: Pancrustacea
- Class: Insecta
- Order: Lepidoptera
- Family: Tortricidae
- Genus: Olethreutes
- Species: O. exoletum

Binomial name
- Olethreutes exoletum Zeller, 1875

= Olethreutes exoletum =

Species of moth

Olethreutes exoletum, the wretched olethreutes moth, is a species of tortricid moth in the family Tortricidae.

The MONA or Hodges number for Olethreutes exoletum is 2791.
