= Phiaris schulziana =

Scientific classification
- Kingdom: Animalia
- Phylum: Arthropoda
- Class: Insecta
- Order: Lepidoptera
- Family: Tortricidae
- Genus: Phiaris
- Species: P. schulziana

Binomial name
- Phiaris schulziana (Fabricius, 1776)

Synonyms
- Olethreutes schulziana

Species of moth

Phiaris schulziana is a member of the leafroller moth (family Tortricidae), belonging to the genus Phiaris, although sometimes it is placed among Olethreutes. The wingspan is 17–25 millimetres (0.67–0.98 in). The forewings are shining whitish, irregularly striated with ferruginous-red, with some leaden-grey marks before and beyond the middle. The costa is blackish marked. The basal patch is partly ferruginous-red, its edge is angulated. It is indented below the angle. The central fascia has a transverse dorsal spot beyond it and a subapical fascia that are all ferruginous-red and sprinkled with black. The cilia are barred. The hindwings are grey, in the female, darker.

It is found in the moors and heaths of northern Europe and in the taiga habitats across the Palearctic. The larvae are found on heather, crowberry (Empetrum nigrum), and bog cranberry (Vaccinium oxycoccos). The adults are active during the late afternoon and evening from June through August.
