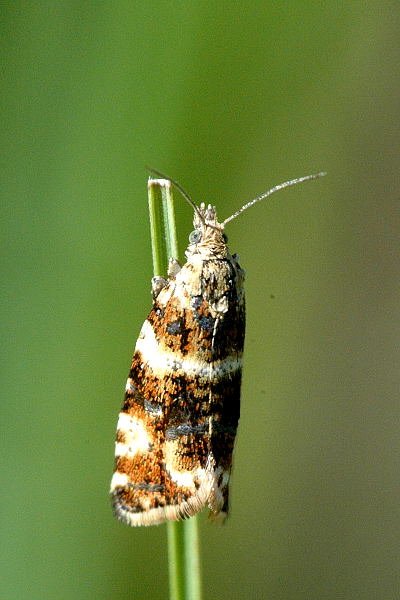

Scientific classification
- Domain: Eukaryota
- Kingdom: Animalia
- Phylum: Arthropoda
- Class: Insecta
- Order: Lepidoptera
- Family: Tortricidae
- Genus: Phiaris
- Species: P. micana

Binomial name
- Phiaris micana (Denis & Schiffermüller, 1775)

Synonyms
- Olethreutes olivana; Olethreutes micana (Denis & Schiffermüller, 1775); Argyrolepia bistrigana Stephens, 1834; Orthotaenia haworthana Stephens, 1834; Sericoris olivana Treitschke, in Ochsenheimer, 1830

= Phiaris micana =

Species of moth

Phiaris micana is a moth of the family Tortricidae. It is found in Europe and across the Palearctic.

The wingspan is 13–18 mm. The ground color of the forewings is brown with varying touches of ochre-coloured scales. In the basal part there is a relatively regular white cross-band that may have some ochre colour along the edge. In the outer part of the wing there is an irregular, white and ochre-coloured band that is often interrupted in the middle. Moreover, in the outer part they are several silvery crosslines. The hindwings are grey-brown. The moth flies from May to July..

The larvae feed on various mosses and herbaceous plants.

== Notes ==
1. The flight season refers to Belgium and the Netherlands. This may vary in other parts of the range.
