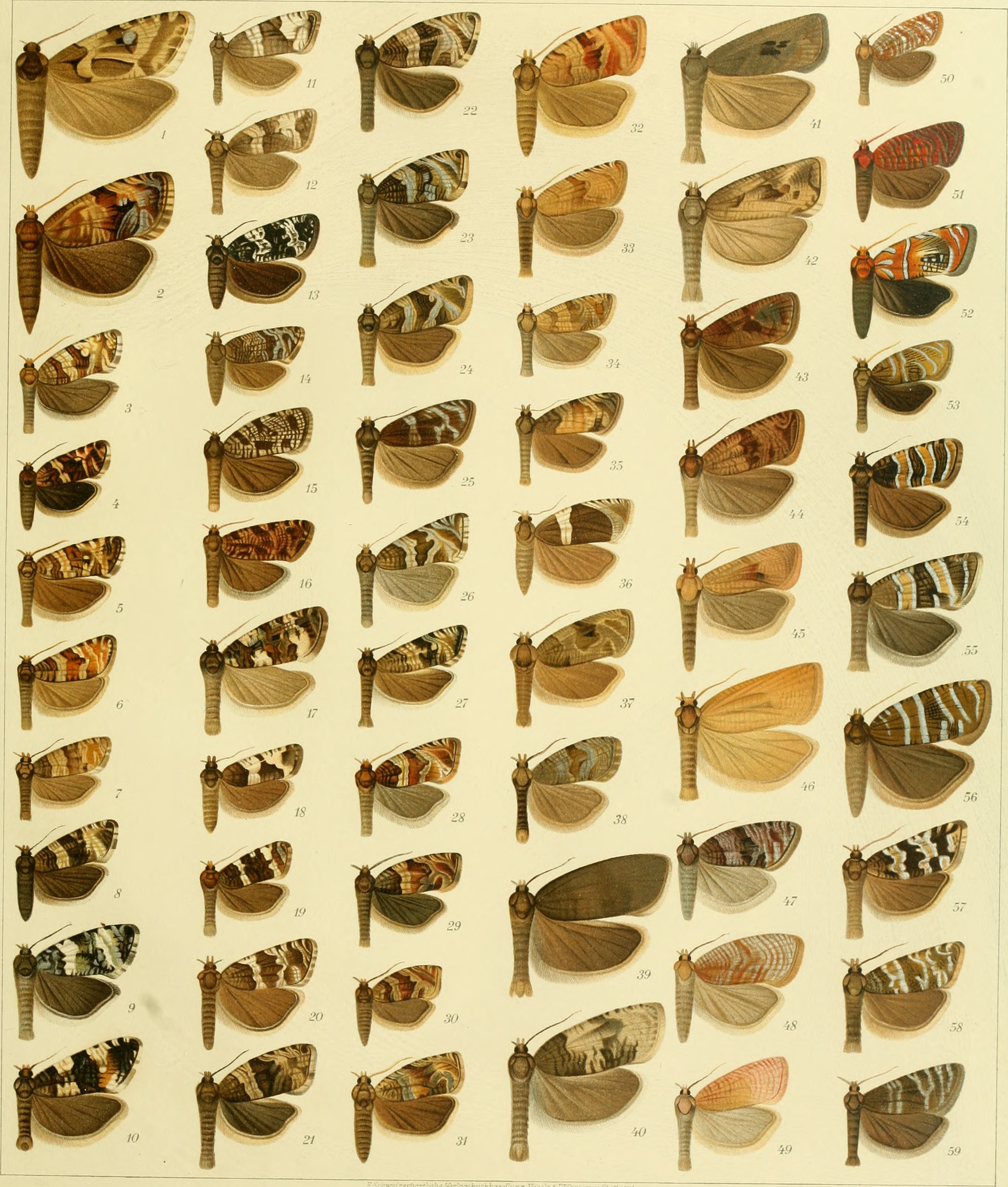
- figure 30

Scientific classification
- Kingdom: Animalia
- Phylum: Arthropoda
- Class: Insecta
- Order: Lepidoptera
- Family: Tortricidae
- Genus: Olethreutes
- Species: O. doubledayana

Binomial name
- Olethreutes doubledayana (Barrett, 1872)

Synonyms
- Celypha doubledayana

= Olethreutes doubledayana =

Species of moth

Olethreutes doubledayana is a moth of the family Tortricidae. It is found in Europe.

The wingspan is 12–13 mm. The palpi are ascending, second joint shortly scaled, terminal rather long. Forewings with costa rather strongly arched, termen little oblique; ochreous - whitish, striated with grey, costa strigulated with dark fuscous; basal patch with sinuate edge, central fascia with two sharp posterior projections, a triangular praetornal spot, and subapical fascia much narrowed costally ochreous or ferruginous-brown, mixed with black. Hindwings are grey.
