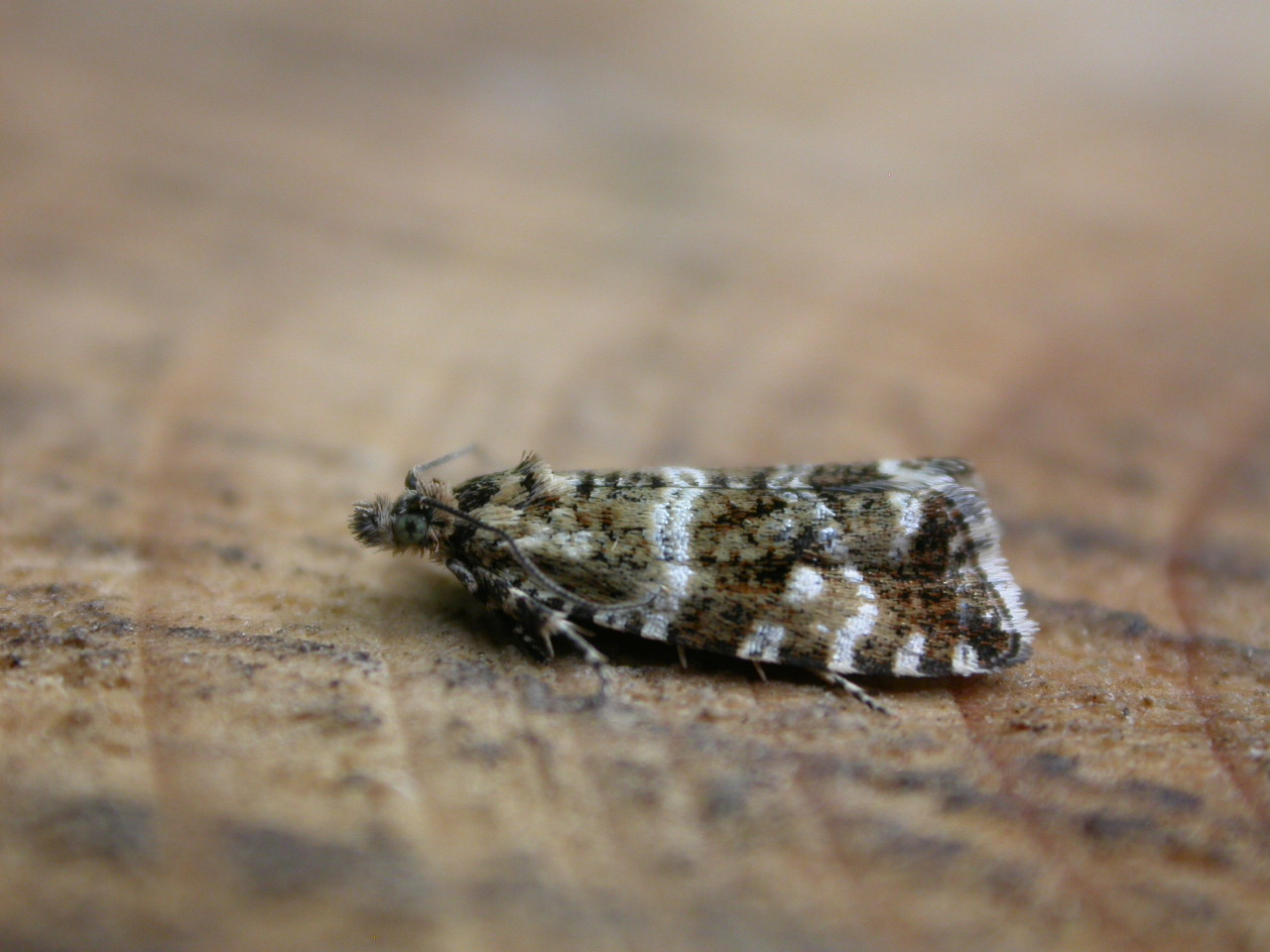

Scientific classification
- Kingdom: Animalia
- Phylum: Arthropoda
- Clade: Pancrustacea
- Class: Insecta
- Order: Lepidoptera
- Family: Tortricidae
- Genus: Olethreutes
- Species: O. palustrana

Binomial name
- Olethreutes palustrana (Lienig & Zeller, 1846)

Synonyms
- Sericoris palustrana Lienig & Zeller, 1846; Phiaris palustrana; Olethreutes disertana Herrich-Schaffer, 1848; Sericoris mendosana Laharpe, 1858; Sericoris puerilana Heinemann, 1863; Argyroploce raneniana Strand, 1920; Argyroploce valesiana Rebel, 1906

= Olethreutes palustrana =

Species of moth

Olethreutes palustrana is a moth of the family Tortricidae. It is found in most of Europe, except the Iberian Peninsula and the Balkan Peninsula. It is also known from the eastern part of the Palearctic realm and North America. The habitat consists of heathland with scattered trees.

The wingspan is 14–16 mm. The forewings are whitish, striated or posteriorly reticulated with pale ferruginous-ochreous. The costa is black-marked, The basal patch with an obliquely sinuate edge. The central fascia is narrowed on dorsum and has a posterior projection below the middle. There is a triangular praetornal spot and the subapical fascia has the anterior edge angulated in middle ferruginous and much marked with black, especially in the female . The hindwings are rather dark grey.

Adults are on wing from the end of May to August.

The larvae feed on various mosses, including Dicranum species.
