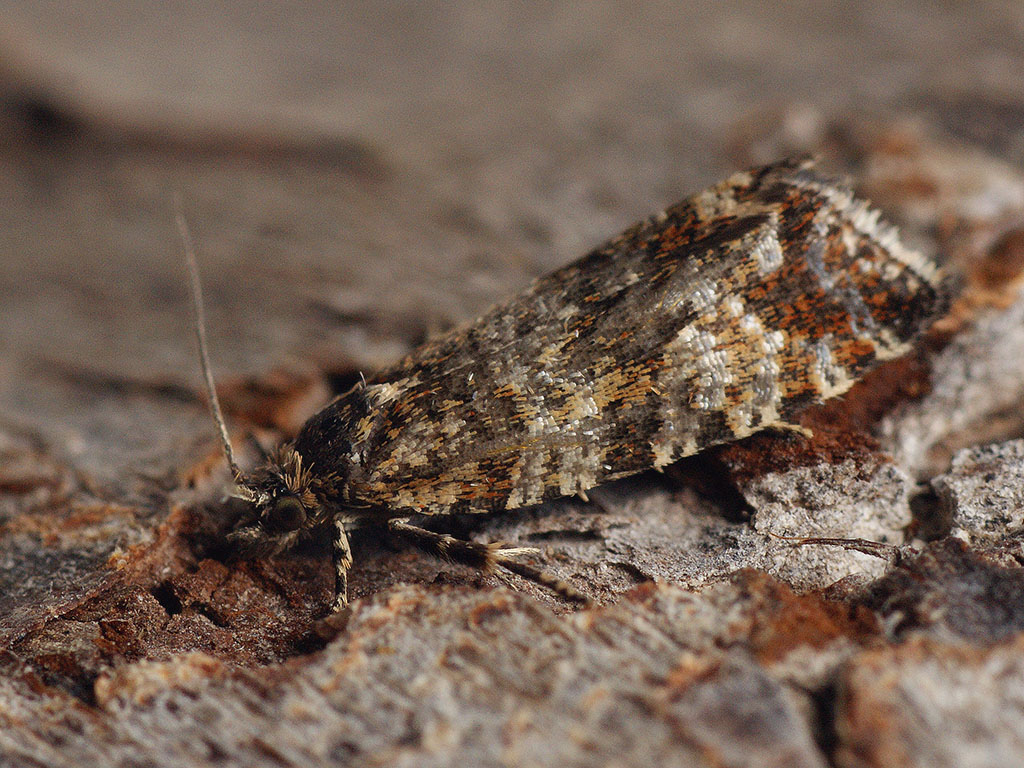

Scientific classification
- Domain: Eukaryota
- Kingdom: Animalia
- Phylum: Arthropoda
- Class: Insecta
- Order: Lepidoptera
- Family: Tortricidae
- Tribe: Olethreutini
- Genus: Phiaris; Hübner, [1825]

= Phiaris =

Genus of tortrix moths

Phiaris is a genus of moths belonging to the family Tortricidae.

== Species ==
- Phiaris acropryerana Bae, 2000
- Phiaris bipunctana (Fabricius, 1794)
- Phiaris castaneanum (Walsingham, 1900)
- Phiaris dolosana (Kennel, 1901)
- Phiaris electana (Kennel, 1901)
- Phiaris examinatus (Falkovitsh, 1966)
- Phiaris exilis (Falkovitsh, 1966)
- Phiaris hokkaidana Bae, 2000
- Phiaris komaii Bae, 2005
- Phiaris metallicana (Hübner, [1799])
- Phiaris micana ([Denis & Schiffermüller], 1775)
- Phiaris mori (Matsumura, 1900)
- Phiaris morivora (Matsumura, 1900)
- Phiaris opacalis Bae, 2000
- Phiaris palustrana (Lienig & Zeller, 1846)
- Phiaris pryeranum (Walsingham, 1900)
- Phiaris schulziana (Fabricius, 1777)
- Phiaris semicremana (Christoph, 1881)
- Phiaris siderana (Treitschke, 1835)
- Phiaris stibiana (Guenée, 1845)
- Phiaris subelectana (Kawabe, 1976)
- Phiaris toshiookui Bae, 2000
- Phiaris transversana (Christoph, 1881)
- Phiaris tsutavora (Oku, 1971)

== See also ==
- List of Tortricidae genera
