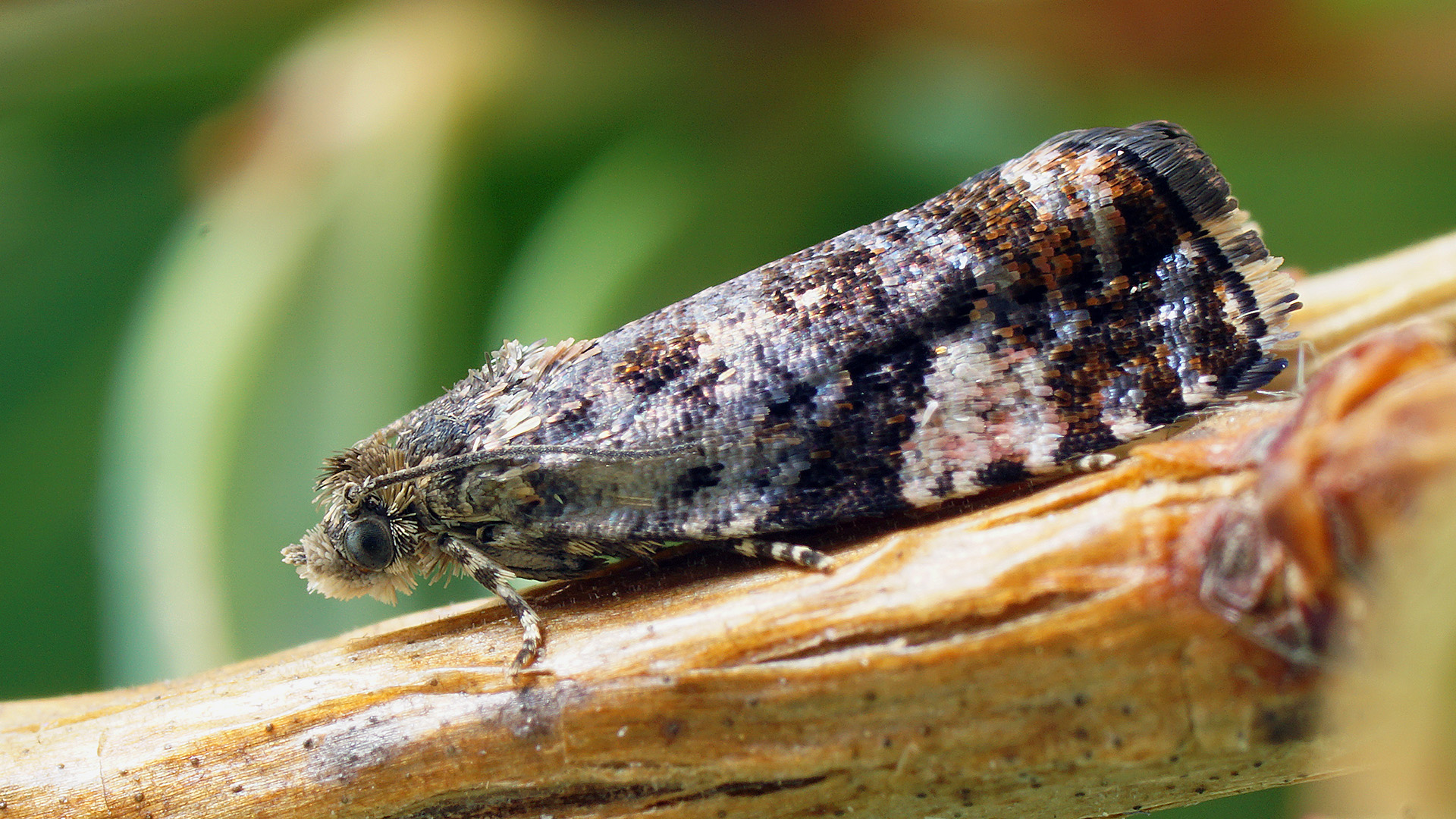
- Argyroploce lediana

Scientific classification
- Domain: Eukaryota
- Kingdom: Animalia
- Phylum: Arthropoda
- Class: Insecta
- Order: Lepidoptera
- Family: Tortricidae
- Tribe: Olethreutini
- Genus: Argyroploce; Hübner, [1825]

= Argyroploce =

Genus of tortrix moths

Argyroploce is a genus of moths belonging to the subfamily Olethreutinae of the family Tortricidae.

== Species ==
- Argyroploce aquilonana Karvonen, 1932
- Argyroploce arbutella (Linnaeus, 1758)
- Argyroploce dalecarliana (Guenée, 1845)
- Argyroploce lediana (Linnaeus, 1758)
- Argyroploce noricana (Herrich-Schäffer, 1851)
- Argyroploce roseomaculana ([Denis & Schiffermüller], 1775)
- Argyroploce unedana Baixeras, 2002

== See also ==
- List of Tortricidae genera
