= Egaña (surname) =

Egaña (pronounced [eˈɣaɲa]) is a Spanish-language surname of Basque origin. Notable people with the surname include:

- Alberto Munárriz Egaña (born 1994), Spanish water polo player
- Imanol Etxeberria Egaña (born 1973) is a Spanish footballer
- Iñaki Egaña (born 1948), Spanish musician and songwriter
- Irati Idirin Egaña (born 1994), Spanish racing cyclist
- Jaime Egaña (1920–2000), Chilean politician, businessman and diplomat
- José Ignacio Urbieta Egaña (1915–1999), Spanish artist and footballer
- Juan Egaña (1769–1836), Chilean politician and philosopher
- María Margarita Egaña Fernández (1921–1975), Cuban architect
- Mariano Egaña Fabres (1793–1846), Chilean lawyer and politician
- Oier Zarraga Egaña (born 1999), Spanish professional footballer

== See also ==
- Egaña (disambiguation)
