= Egaña (disambiguation) =

Egaña is a village in the Soriano Department of western Uruguay.

Egaña may also refer to:

== Places ==
- Egaña, barangay in Sibalom, Antique, Philippines
- Plaza Egaña metro station, Santiago, Chile

== People ==
- Egaña (surname), people with the name

== See also ==
- Platynota egana, species of moth
