= Rodrigo Egaña =

Chilean economist (born 1947)

Rodrigo Egaña Baraona
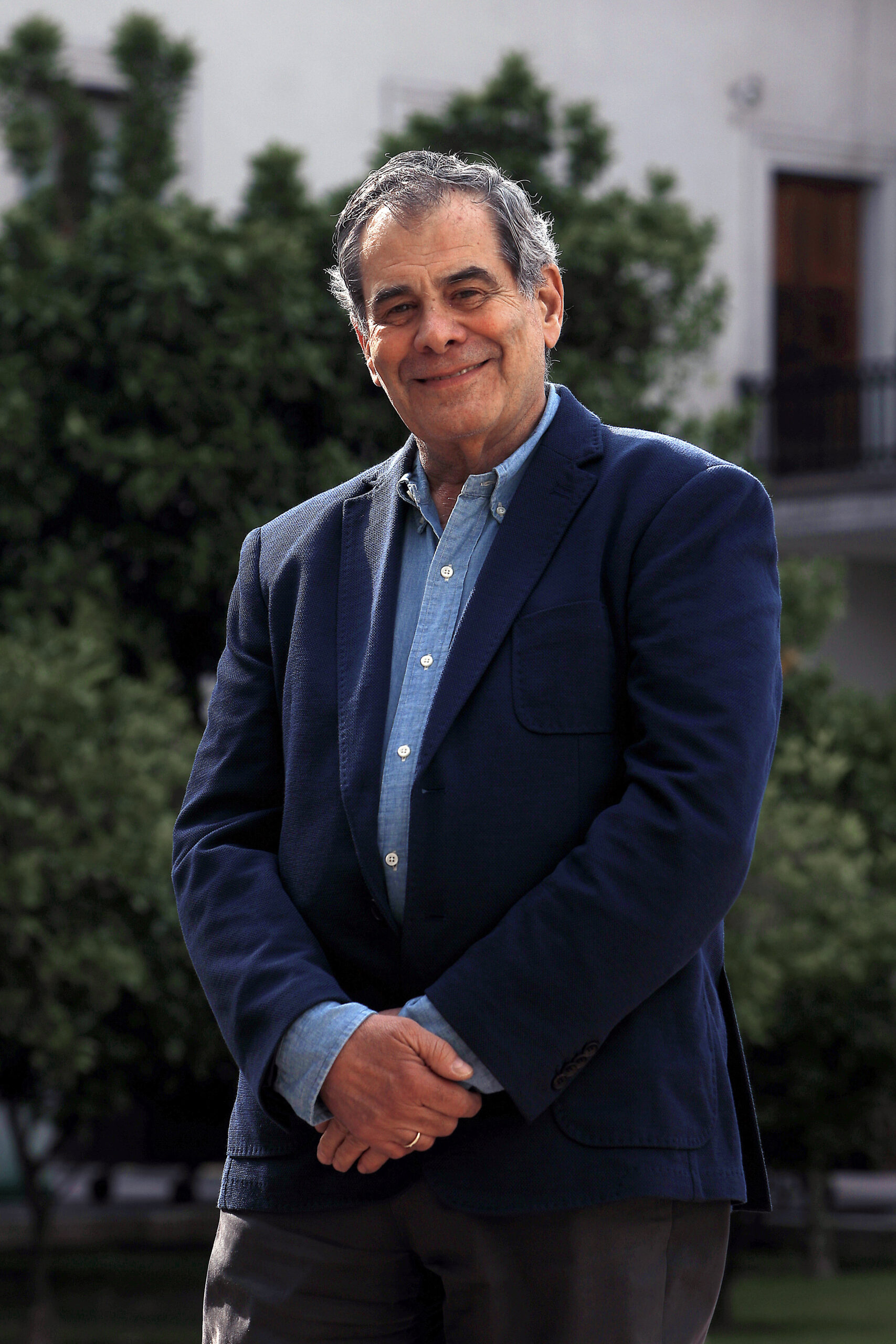
- Official portrait as Director of Public Education

National Director of Public Education of Chile
- Incumbent
- Assumed office 24 May 2024
- President: Gabriel Boric
- Preceded by: Himself (acting)

National Director of Public Education of Chile (acting)
- In office 1 December 2023 – 24 May 2024
- President: Gabriel Boric
- Preceded by: Jaime Veas Sánchez
- Succeeded by: Himself

National Director of Public Education of Chile
- In office 30 November 2017 – 31 November 2018
- President: Michelle Bachelet
- Preceded by: Office established
- Succeeded by: María Alejandra Grebe Noguera

Director of the Civil Service of Chile
- In office 11 March 2014 – 17 November 2017
- President: Michelle Bachelet
- Preceded by: Carlos Williamson Benaprés
- Succeeded by: Alejandro Weber

Undersecretary General of the Presidency (Chile)
- In office 6 March 2003 – 11 March 2006
- President: Ricardo Lagos
- Preceded by: Gonzalo Martner Fanta
- Succeeded by: Edgardo Riveros Marín

Personal details
- Born: 1947 (age 78–79) Santiago, Chile
- Party: Socialist Party of Chile (since 1988); MAPU Obrero Campesino (1973–1985)
- Children: 3
- Relatives: Jaime Egaña (uncle); Andrés Egaña (cousin)
- Education: Colegio del Verbo Divino; Pontifical Catholic University of Chile
- Occupation: Business administrator; academic; consultant; politician

Rodrigo Fernando Egaña Baraona (born 1947) is a Chilean business administrator, academic, consultant, and politician affiliated with the Socialist Party of Chile. He has been an active collaborator with the center-left governments of the Concertación de Partidos por la Democracia coalition.

Since May 24, 2024, he has served as the National Director of Public Education under the Gabriel Boric administration.

== Biography ==
He studied at the Colegio del Verbo Divino and the Pontifical Catholic University of Chile, both located in the capital city. At the university, he earned a degree in business administration in 1970. He later obtained a specialization in development planning in the Netherlands.

In his youth, he was involved in the MAPU Obrero Campesino. He later became a member of the Socialist Party of Chile (PS), and was considered close to José Antonio Viera-Gallo.

During the presidency of Patricio Aylwin, he served as executive director of the Chilean Agency for International Development Cooperation (AGCI) under the Ministry of Foreign Affairs. Under Eduardo Frei Ruiz-Tagle, he was coordinator of the Ministry General Secretariat of the Presidency, and under Ricardo Lagos, he served as Undersecretary of that same ministry between 2003 and 2006.

Between 1997 and 2000, he led the National Environment Commission (CONAMA). He also served as executive director of the State Reform and Modernization Project of the Government of Chile, until 2002.

In May 2007, he was appointed Director of Public Policy Management at the Presidency during the government of Michelle Bachelet. In January 2008, he became Presidential Commissioner for Indigenous Affairs.

In 2010, during the presidency of Sebastián Piñera, his name was submitted to the Senate as a nominee to the Senior Public Management Council. His appointment (for a term ending in 2016) was confirmed by 26 votes in favor, 2 abstentions, and 1 against in late July that year. In March 2014, he was appointed president of the council by Michelle Bachelet during her second administration.

From November 2017 to November 2018, he served as the first director of the Public Education Directorate (DEP). He later worked as an academic and Director of Economic Affairs and Institutional Management at the Faculty of Government of the University of Chile. On December 1, 2023, he again assumed the role of acting director of the DEP following the resignation of Jaime Veas.

On May 24, 2024, President Gabriel Boric, through the Ministry of Education (Chile), confirmed his appointment as Director of the Public Education Directorate (DEP) through the Senior Public Management System.
