= Platynota larreana =

Scientific classification
- Kingdom: Animalia
- Phylum: Arthropoda
- Class: Insecta
- Order: Lepidoptera
- Family: Tortricidae
- Genus: Platynota
- Species: P. larreana

Binomial name
- Platynota larreana (Comstock, 1939)

Synonyms
- Sparganothis larreana Comstock, 1939

Species of moth

Platynota larreana is a species of moth of the family Tortricidae. It is found in the United States from the Mojave Desert in California to western Arizona.

The wingspan is 18-18.5 mm. Adults are rust brown. They are on wing from February to May.

The larvae feed on Larrea tridentata. They have also been reared on Oenothera and Buddleja species. The larvae are bright green.
