= Platynota breviplicana =

Scientific classification
- Domain: Eukaryota
- Kingdom: Animalia
- Phylum: Arthropoda
- Class: Insecta
- Order: Lepidoptera
- Family: Tortricidae
- Genus: Platynota
- Species: P. breviplicana

Binomial name
- Platynota breviplicana Walsingham, 1897

Synonyms
- Platynota diminutana Walsingham, 1897

Species of moth

Platynota breviplicana is a species of moth of the family Tortricidae. It is found in Grenada.

The wingspan is about 15 mm. The forewings have a short brownish-ochreous basal patch. The whole of the middle portion of the wing is overclouded by a broad dark umber-brown band, beyond which the terminal portion is shining whitish ochreous with two sinuate (wavy) lines of slightly raised scales. There are also some raised scales on the dark central band, notably in an oblique line from its upper and inner angle ending in a strong patch near the outer end of the fold and in a small patch at the outer end of the cell. The hindwings are cinnamon brown, blending to ochreous towards the base.
