= Platynota subtinae =

Scientific classification
- Domain: Eukaryota
- Kingdom: Animalia
- Phylum: Arthropoda
- Class: Insecta
- Order: Lepidoptera
- Family: Tortricidae
- Genus: Platynota
- Species: P. subtinae

Binomial name
- Platynota subtinae Brown, 2013

Species of moth

Platynota subtinae is a species of moth of the family Tortricidae. It is found in Venezuela, Bolivia and Paraguay.

The larvae have been reared from Gossypium species, but are suspected to be polyphagous.
