= Platynota xylophaea =

Scientific classification
- Kingdom: Animalia
- Phylum: Arthropoda
- Class: Insecta
- Order: Lepidoptera
- Family: Tortricidae
- Genus: Platynota
- Species: P. xylophaea

Binomial name
- Platynota xylophaea (Meyrick, 1912)

Synonyms
- Capua xylophaea Meyrick, 1912

Species of moth

Platynota xylophaea is a species of moth of the family Tortricidae. It is found in Argentina.
