= Platynota wenzelana =

Scientific classification
- Kingdom: Animalia
- Phylum: Arthropoda
- Clade: Pancrustacea
- Class: Insecta
- Order: Lepidoptera
- Family: Tortricidae
- Genus: Platynota
- Species: P. wenzelana

Binomial name
- Platynota wenzelana (Haimbach, 1915)

Synonyms
- Amorbia wenzelana Haimbach, 1915

Species of moth

Platynota wenzelana is a species of moth of the family Tortricidae. It is found in the United States in Arizona and New Mexico.

The wingspan is 20–24 mm.
