= Platynota yumana =

Scientific classification
- Domain: Eukaryota
- Kingdom: Animalia
- Phylum: Arthropoda
- Class: Insecta
- Order: Lepidoptera
- Family: Tortricidae
- Genus: Platynota
- Species: P. yumana

Binomial name
- Platynota yumana (Kearfott, 1907)

Synonyms
- Sparganothis yumana Kearfott, 1907

Species of moth

Platynota yumana is a species of moth of the family Tortricidae. It is found in the United States in Arizona and California.

The wingspan is about 15 mm.
