= Platynota zymogramma =

Scientific classification
- Kingdom: Animalia
- Phylum: Arthropoda
- Class: Insecta
- Order: Lepidoptera
- Family: Tortricidae
- Genus: Platynota
- Species: P. zymogramma

Binomial name
- Platynota zymogramma (Meyrick, 1926)

Synonyms
- Amorbia zymogramma Meyrick, 1926

Species of moth

Platynota zymogramma is a species of moth of the family Tortricidae. It is found in Peru.
