= Platynota restitutana =

Scientific classification
- Kingdom: Animalia
- Phylum: Arthropoda
- Class: Insecta
- Order: Lepidoptera
- Family: Tortricidae
- Genus: Platynota
- Species: P. restitutana

Binomial name
- Platynota restitutana (Walker, 1863)

Synonyms
- Teras restitutana Walker, 1863

Species of moth

Platynota restitutana is a species of moth of the family Tortricidae. It is found in the Dominican Republic.
