= Platynota labiosana =

Scientific classification
- Kingdom: Animalia
- Phylum: Arthropoda
- Clade: Pancrustacea
- Class: Insecta
- Order: Lepidoptera
- Family: Tortricidae
- Genus: Platynota
- Species: P. labiosana

Binomial name
- Platynota labiosana (Zeller, 1875)

Synonyms
- Tortrix labiosana Zeller, 1875; Platynota rubiginis Walsingham, 1913

Species of moth

Platynota labiosana is a species of moth of the family Tortricidae. It is found in the United States from southern California and Utah to Texas and southern Colorado, and south through Mexico to Guatemala.

The wingspan is about 15–21 mm. The main flight period is March to September, but adults have been recorded on wing year round in Texas.
