= Platynota nigrocervina =

Scientific classification
- Domain: Eukaryota
- Kingdom: Animalia
- Phylum: Arthropoda
- Class: Insecta
- Order: Lepidoptera
- Family: Tortricidae
- Genus: Platynota
- Species: P. nigrocervina

Binomial name
- Platynota nigrocervina Walsingham, 1895

Species of moth

Platynota nigrocervina is a species of moth of the family Tortricidae. It is found in the United States from Texas, Oklahoma and Colorado to Michigan south to Florida.

The wingspan is 20–23 mm. Adults are on wing from March to September in most of the range, but year round in Florida.

The larvae feed on Zea mays and Abelmoschus esculentus.
