= Platynota zapatana =

Scientific classification
- Kingdom: Animalia
- Phylum: Arthropoda
- Clade: Pancrustacea
- Class: Insecta
- Order: Lepidoptera
- Family: Tortricidae
- Genus: Platynota
- Species: P. zapatana

Binomial name
- Platynota zapatana Powell & Brown, 2012

Species of moth

Platynota zapatana is a species of moth of the family Tortricidae. It is found in the southern United States (Arizona, New Mexico and Texas) and Mexico (Coahuila, Nuevo Leon, San Luis Potosi and Tamaulipas).
