= Platynota islameconae =

Scientific classification
- Kingdom: Animalia
- Phylum: Arthropoda
- Clade: Pancrustacea
- Class: Insecta
- Order: Lepidoptera
- Family: Tortricidae
- Genus: Platynota
- Species: P. islameconae

Binomial name
- Platynota islameconae Powell & Brown, 2012

Species of moth

Platynota islameconae is a species of moth of the family Tortricidae. It is found in California in the United States.
