= Directorate of Public Education =

- Dirección de Educación Pública
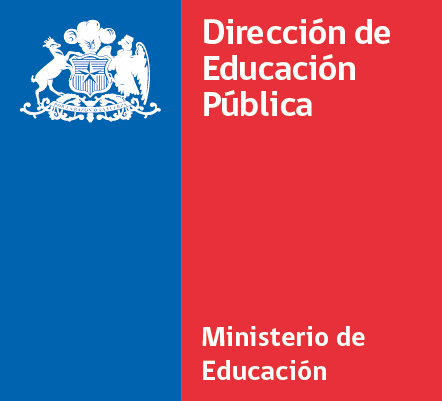
- Government logo

Agency overview
- Formed: 24 November 2017
- Jurisdiction: Chile
- Headquarters: Santiago, Chile
- Annual budget: CLP 485,759,636 million (2026)
- Agency executive: Rodrigo Egaña Baraona, Director
- Parent agency: Ministry of Education
- Website: educacionpublica.cl

The Directorate of Public Education (DEP) is a decentralized public agency in Chile, under the authority of the Ministry of Education. It is responsible for the management and coordination of the Public Education System, ensuring that the Local Public Education Services (SLEPs) provide quality education throughout the country.

== Background ==
In 1920, the Compulsory Primary Education Law was enacted, whose Article 18 stated that "Primary education shall be under the responsibility of the Ministry of Public Instruction" [sic]. For about sixty years, primary and secondary public education was administered directly by the State through the Ministry of Education.

In 1979, with the enactment of Decree Law No. 3,063, a process of municipalization began, whereby the administrative responsibility of educational institutions was transferred to Municipal Departments of Education (DAEMs) or Municipal Education Directorates (DEMs).

Following the return to democracy, various organizations of teachers and students raised concerns about the municipal administration of public education. Students in particular became the primary advocates for ending municipal control, especially after the major student movements of 2006 and 2011.

In her 2013 presidential campaign, Michelle Bachelet proposed a comprehensive education reform that included ending the municipal era in public education administration. Once in office for her second term, the president introduced a bill in 2015 that culminated in the enactment of Law No. 21,040 on November 24, 2017. This law "Creates the Public Education System" and established a gradual process of de-municipalization. Between 2018 and 2025, the administration of preschool, primary, and secondary education is to be transferred to 70 Local Public Education Services (SLEPs), decentralized public agencies with their own legal personality and assets.

As of September 2022, 15 out of the 70 Local Public Education Services had been implemented.

== Functions ==
The Directorate of Public Education has the following functions and responsibilities:

- Propose to the Ministry of Education the National Public Education Strategy that members of the system must follow, and ensure its implementation.
- Draft and submit to the Minister of Education the educational management agreements, and oversee their monitoring, evaluation, and revision.
- Propose to the Minister of Education the professional profile required for candidates applying for the position of Executive Director of the Local Services.
- Provide technical assistance to the administrative management of the Local Services.
- Allocate funds to the Local Services, in accordance with the Public Sector Budget Law.
- Make recommendations regarding the Annual Plan.
- Guide the Local Services in developing public education offerings across the national territory.
- Coordinate the Local Services, promoting collaborative and networked work.
- Propose innovation plans to the Local Services, aligned with Ministry of Education policies.
- Propose to the Ministry of Education policies, plans, and programs related to public education.
- Maintain a registry of the strategic plans of the Local Services.
- Supervise and ensure compliance with agreements involving technical-professional education institutions under the delegated administration regime.
- Coordinate the relationship between the Local Services and the Ministry of Education, as well as other agencies of the State Administration.
- Promote improvements in the quality of education provided by schools under the Local Services that serve individuals under any regime of deprivation of liberty or social reintegration programs.
- Request from Local Services and their schools all necessary information for fulfilling its functions and responsibilities.
- Request information from the Agency for Quality in Education and the Superintendency of Education, and coordinate with them within their respective areas of responsibility concerning Local Services and their schools.
- Define operational policies and functioning of monitoring, management, information, and tracking systems for the Local Services, aiming to ensure the use of digital tools.
- Conduct or commission studies, diagnostics, and evaluations of the educational situation of each Local Service and their schools.
- Enter into agreements with public or private entities to address matters of mutual interest.
- Present an annual public report on the status and projections of the Public Education System.
- Exercise any other functions and powers assigned by law.

== Institutional structure ==
=== Leadership ===
According to the law, the direction and administration of the institution is entrusted to the Director of Public Education, who is appointed by the President of Chile through the Senior Public Management System. The Director is the chief executive of the service, is empowered to propose to the Ministry of Education the removal of Executive Directors of Local Services, and represents the state extrajudicially in executing actions and contracts necessary to fulfill the institution's mandate.

=== Directors ===
| Director | Term start | Term end | President |
|---|---|---|---|
| Rodrigo Egaña Baraona | 2017 | 2019 | Michelle Bachelet; Sebastián Piñera |
| María Alejandra Grebe Noguera | 2019 | 2022 | Sebastián Piñera |
| Alexis Moreira Arenas (acting) | 2022 | 2022 | Gabriel Boric |
| Jaime Veas Sánchez | 2022 | 2023 | Gabriel Boric |
| Rodrigo Egaña Baraona (acting) | 2023 | 2024 | Gabriel Boric |
| Rodrigo Egaña Baraona | 2024 | Incumbent | Gabriel Boric |

=== Internal structure ===
The organizational structure of the Directorate of Public Education (Dirección de Educación Pública, DEP), headed by the Director of Public Education, is organized into subdirectorates, divisions, departments, units and subdepartments, in accordance with its official organizational chart.

Executive level

- Director of Public Education
  - Cabinet
  - Audit Subdepartment
  - Legal Advisory Department
  - Communications Subdepartment
  - Integrated Territorial Management Unit

Subdirectorates

- Subdirectorate of Strategic Development
- Subdirectorate of Internal Management

Divisions

- Educational Development Division
- SLEP Implementation Division
- SLEP Management and Budget Division

Departments

- Infrastructure and Educational Facilities Department

Under the Subdirectorate of Strategic Development

- Monitoring, Studies and Data Subdepartment
- Gender, Inclusion and Participation Subdepartment
- Coordination of the NEP Implementation Subdepartment

Under the Subdirectorate of Internal Management

- Institutional Finance Subdepartment
  - Treasury Section
  - Accounting Section
  - Budget Section
  - Accountability Section
- People Management and Development Subdepartment
  - Administrative Processes and Management Control Section
  - Organizational Development Section
  - Remunerations Section
- Institutional Administration Subdepartment
  - Procurement and Contracts Section
  - Internal Services Section
- Internal Processes Management and Innovation Subdepartment

Under the Educational Development Division

- Educational Installation and Management Subdepartment
- Educational Programs and Professional Development Subdepartment
- Learning Improvement and Educational Innovation Subdepartment

Under the SLEP Implementation Division

- Liaison and Transfer Support Subdepartment
- SLEP Installation Subdepartment
- Regulations and Transfer Subdepartment
- Planning and Management Control Section

Under the SLEP Management and Budget Division

- Financial Management Support Subdepartment
- Budget Management Subdepartment
- SLEP GDP Subdepartment
- Operations Management Subdepartment

Under the Infrastructure and Educational Facilities Department

- Territorial Infrastructure Management Subdepartment
  - Disaster Risk and Emergency Management Section
  - Territorial Analysis and Monitoring Section
  - Investment Portfolio Planning Section
- Project Management Subdepartment
  - Projects Section
  - Works Section
  - Regulations and Official Recognition Section
- Budget Management and Control Subdepartment
  - Monitoring and Control of SLEPs Section
  - Monitoring and Control of Agreements and Other Providers Section
- Infrastructure Planning and Management Control Subdepartment
  - Infrastructure Planning and Management Control Section
  - Transparency Management Section
  - Data and Systems Section

== See also ==
- Education in Chile
- General Education Law (Chile)
- National Education Council (Chile)
- Impact of the COVID-19 pandemic on education
