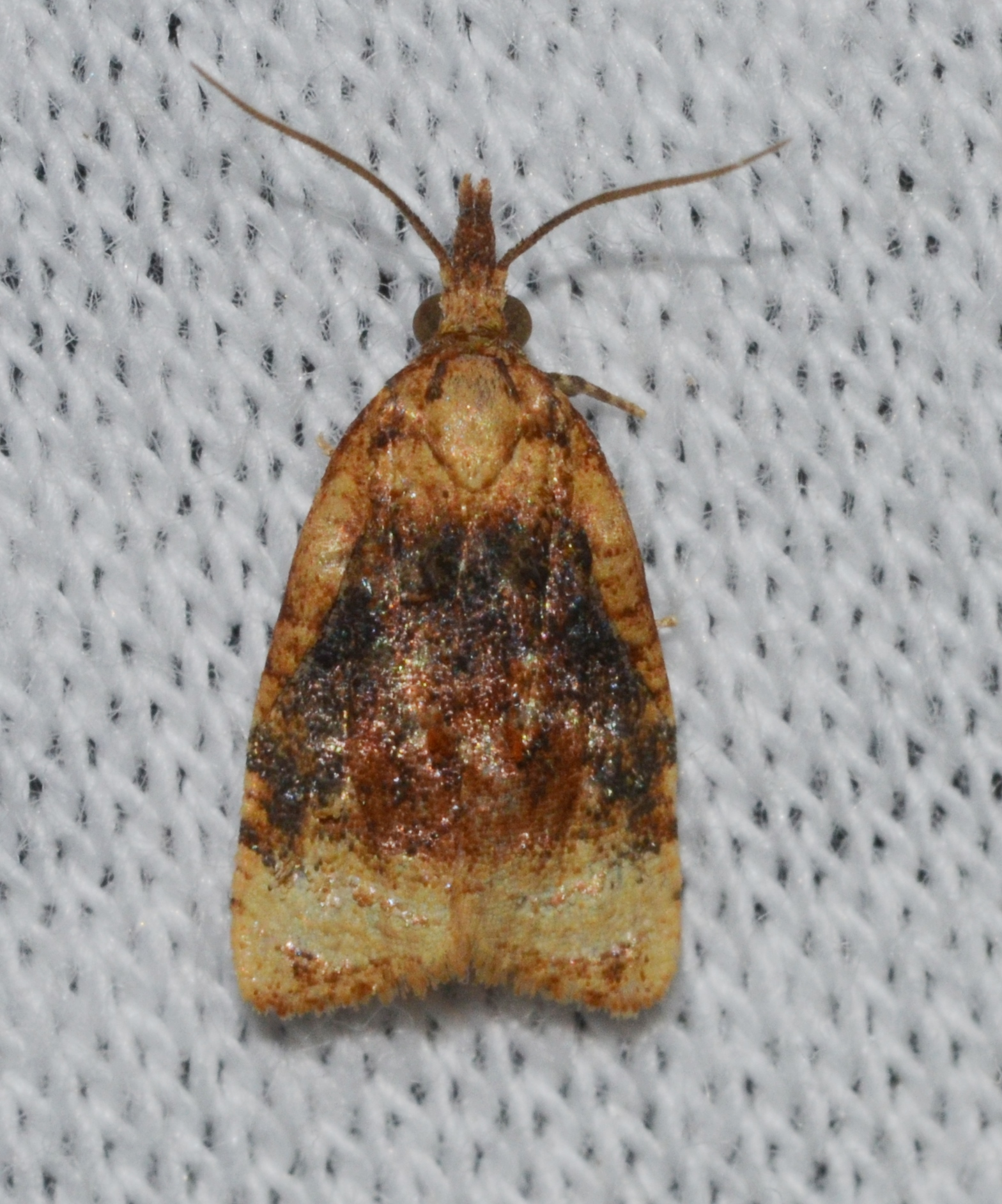

Scientific classification
- Kingdom: Animalia
- Phylum: Arthropoda
- Clade: Pancrustacea
- Class: Insecta
- Order: Lepidoptera
- Family: Tortricidae
- Genus: Platynota
- Species: P. flavedana

Binomial name
- Platynota flavedana Clemens, 1860

Synonyms
- Teras concursana Walker, 1863; Platynota iridana Barnes & Busck, 1920; Teras laterana Robinson, 1869; Teras tinctana Walker, 1863

= Platynota flavedana =

Species of moth

Platynota flavedana, the black-shaded platynota moth, is a species of moth of the family Tortricidae. It is found in the United States from Minnesota to Maine, south to North Carolina and west to Arizona.

The length of the forewings is 5-6.5 mm for males and 6-8.5 mm for females.

The larvae feed on various plants and have been recorded on Acer, Eupatorium, Helianthus, Dianthus caryophyllus, Helianthemum, Hypericum perforatum, Rhododendron, Trifolium, Sassafras, Gossypium hirsutum, Gossypium thurberi, Fragaria, Prunus persica, Rosa and Citrus species.
