= Platynota viridana =

Scientific classification
- Domain: Eukaryota
- Kingdom: Animalia
- Phylum: Arthropoda
- Class: Insecta
- Order: Lepidoptera
- Family: Tortricidae
- Genus: Platynota
- Species: P. viridana

Binomial name
- Platynota viridana Barnes & Busck, 1920

Species of moth

Platynota viridana is a species of moth of the family Tortricidae first described by William Barnes and August Busck in . It is found in the United States in Arizona, Texas and South Carolina.

The wingspan is 13–18 mm.
