= Platynota subargentea =

Scientific classification
- Domain: Eukaryota
- Kingdom: Animalia
- Phylum: Arthropoda
- Class: Insecta
- Order: Lepidoptera
- Family: Tortricidae
- Genus: Platynota
- Species: P. subargentea

Binomial name
- Platynota subargentea Walsingham, 1913

Species of moth

Platynota subargentea is a species of moth of the family Tortricidae. It is found in Costa Rica.

The wingspan is about 19 mm. The forewings are shining, silvery grey, with transverse lines and spots of raised scales. The costa from near the base is shaded with brown, which extends around the apex to below the middle of the termen. The hindwings are chestnut brown.
