= Platynota polingi =

Scientific classification
- Kingdom: Animalia
- Phylum: Arthropoda
- Clade: Pancrustacea
- Class: Insecta
- Order: Lepidoptera
- Family: Tortricidae
- Genus: Platynota
- Species: P. polingi

Binomial name
- Platynota polingi Powell & Brown, 2012

Species of moth

Platynota polingi is a species of moth of the family Tortricidae. It is found in Arizona in the United States.
