= Platynota helianthes =

Scientific classification
- Kingdom: Animalia
- Phylum: Arthropoda
- Class: Insecta
- Order: Lepidoptera
- Family: Tortricidae
- Genus: Platynota
- Species: P. helianthes

Binomial name
- Platynota helianthes (Meyrick, 1932)

Synonyms
- Sparganothis helianthes Meyrick, 1932

Species of moth

Platynota helianthes is a species of moth of the family Tortricidae. It is found in Costa Rica.
