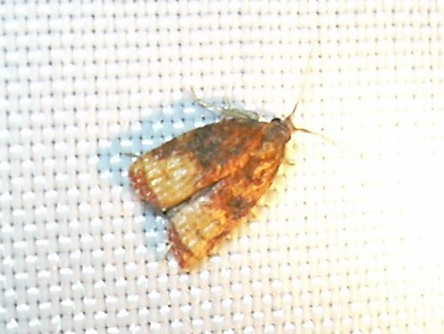

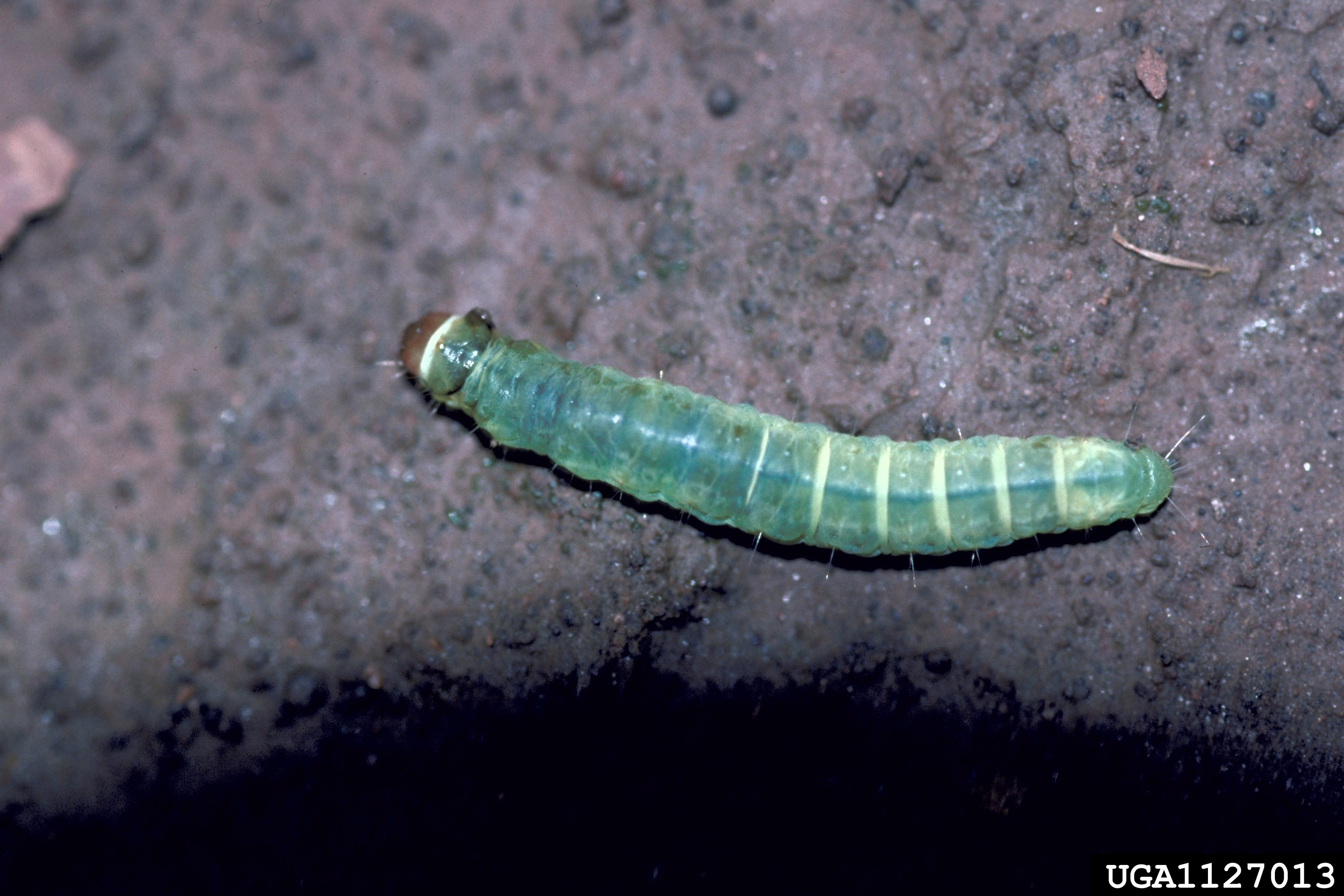
- Adult (top) and larva (bottom)

Scientific classification
- Kingdom: Animalia
- Phylum: Arthropoda
- Clade: Pancrustacea
- Class: Insecta
- Order: Lepidoptera
- Family: Tortricidae
- Genus: Platynota
- Species: P. stultana

Binomial name
- Platynota stultana Walsingham, 1884

Synonyms
- Platynota chiquitana Barnes & Busck, 1920

= Platynota stultana =

Species of moth

The omnivorous leafroller (Platynota stultana) is a moth of the family Tortricidae. It is found in Mexico and the United States (California, Arizona, Texas, Florida and Hawaii).

The wingspan is about 14 mm. Adults are on wing year-round. There are four to six generations per year in California.

Larvae have been recorded on a wide range of plants. It is considered a serious economic pest of greenhouse plants and vineyards. Feeding damage to grape leads to bunch-rot, resulting in crop losses amounting to 80%. Furthermore the larvae are known to cause "surface erosion that diminishes the market value of fruit" including citrus, stone fruits and berries.
