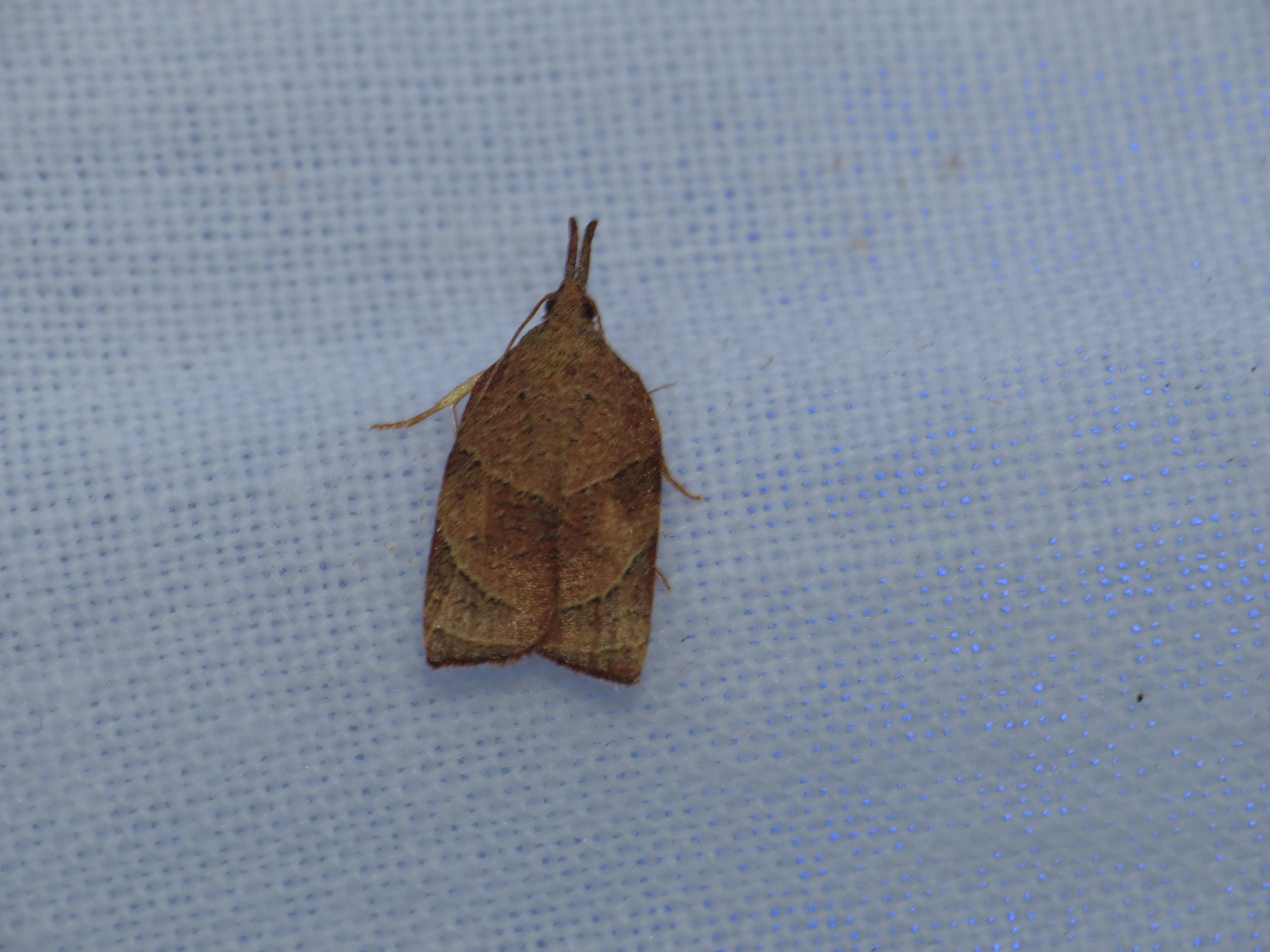

Scientific classification
- Kingdom: Animalia
- Phylum: Arthropoda
- Class: Insecta
- Order: Lepidoptera
- Family: Tortricidae
- Genus: Platynota
- Species: P. rostrana

Binomial name
- Platynota rostrana (Walker, 1863)

Synonyms
- Teras rostrana Walker, 1863; Teras connexana Walker, 1863; Teras repandana Walker, 1863; Teras saturatana Walker, 1863

= Platynota rostrana =

Species of moth

Platynota rostrana, the omnivorous platynota moth, is a species of moth of the family Tortricidae. It is found from the United States (where it has been recorded from Alabama, Arizona, California, Florida, Georgia, Indiana, Louisiana, Mississippi, New Jersey, North Carolina, Oklahoma, South Carolina, Tennessee, Texas and Virginia), south through Mexico and Central America to South America (including Venezuela and Brazil). Its native range also includes the West Indies. It has been recorded from Europe, where it may temporarily establish through accidental importation in tropical plants.

The wingspan is 13–17 mm.
