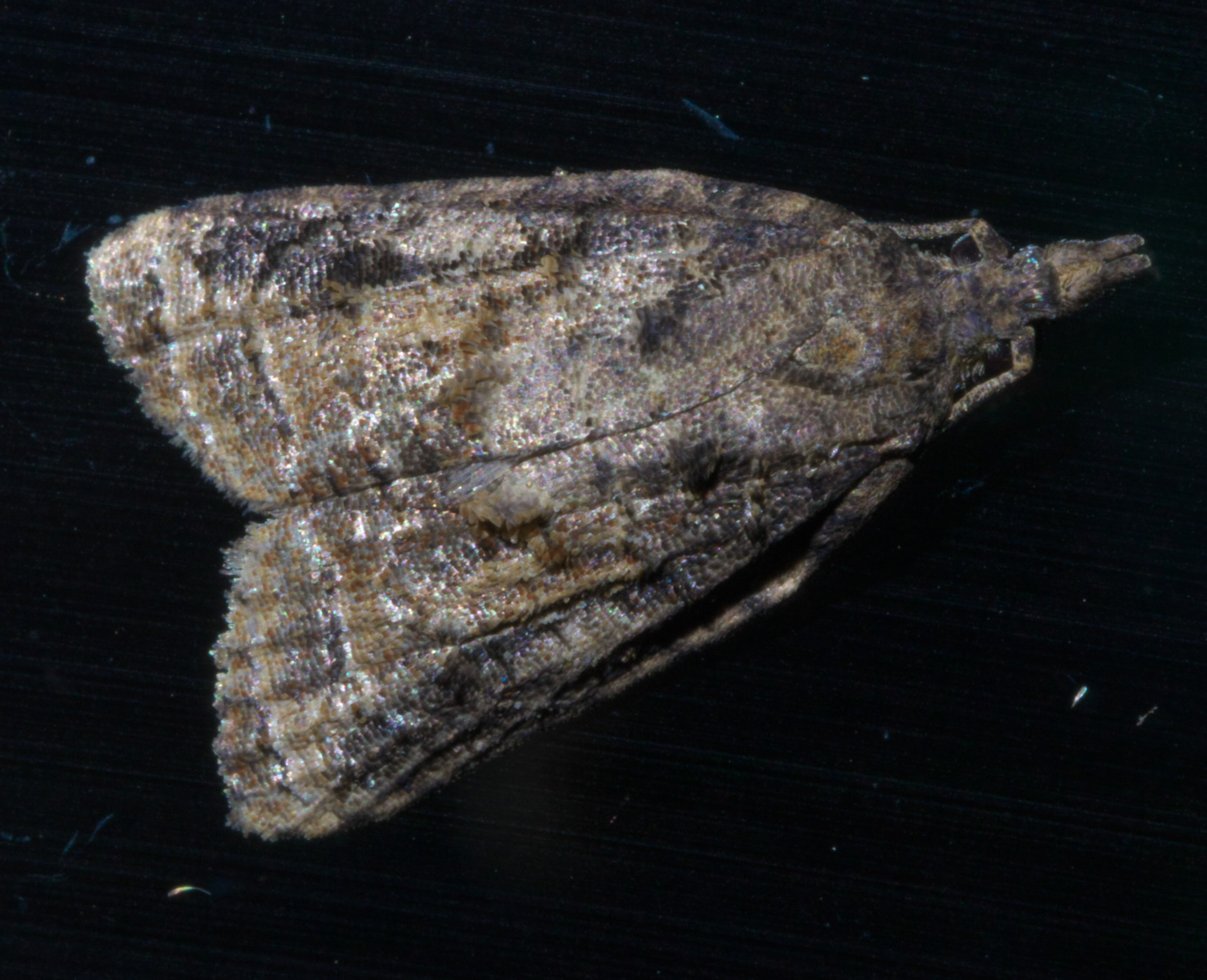

Scientific classification
- Kingdom: Animalia
- Phylum: Arthropoda
- Clade: Pancrustacea
- Class: Insecta
- Order: Lepidoptera
- Family: Tortricidae
- Tribe: Sparganothini
- Genus: Platynota; Clemens, 1860

Synonyms
- Ceratorrhineta Kirby, 1880; Ceratorrhyneta Razowski, 1977; Cerorrhineta Zeller, 1877; Patynota Walsingham, 1914; Phylacteritis Meyrick, 1922

= Platynota (moth) =

Genus of tortrix moths

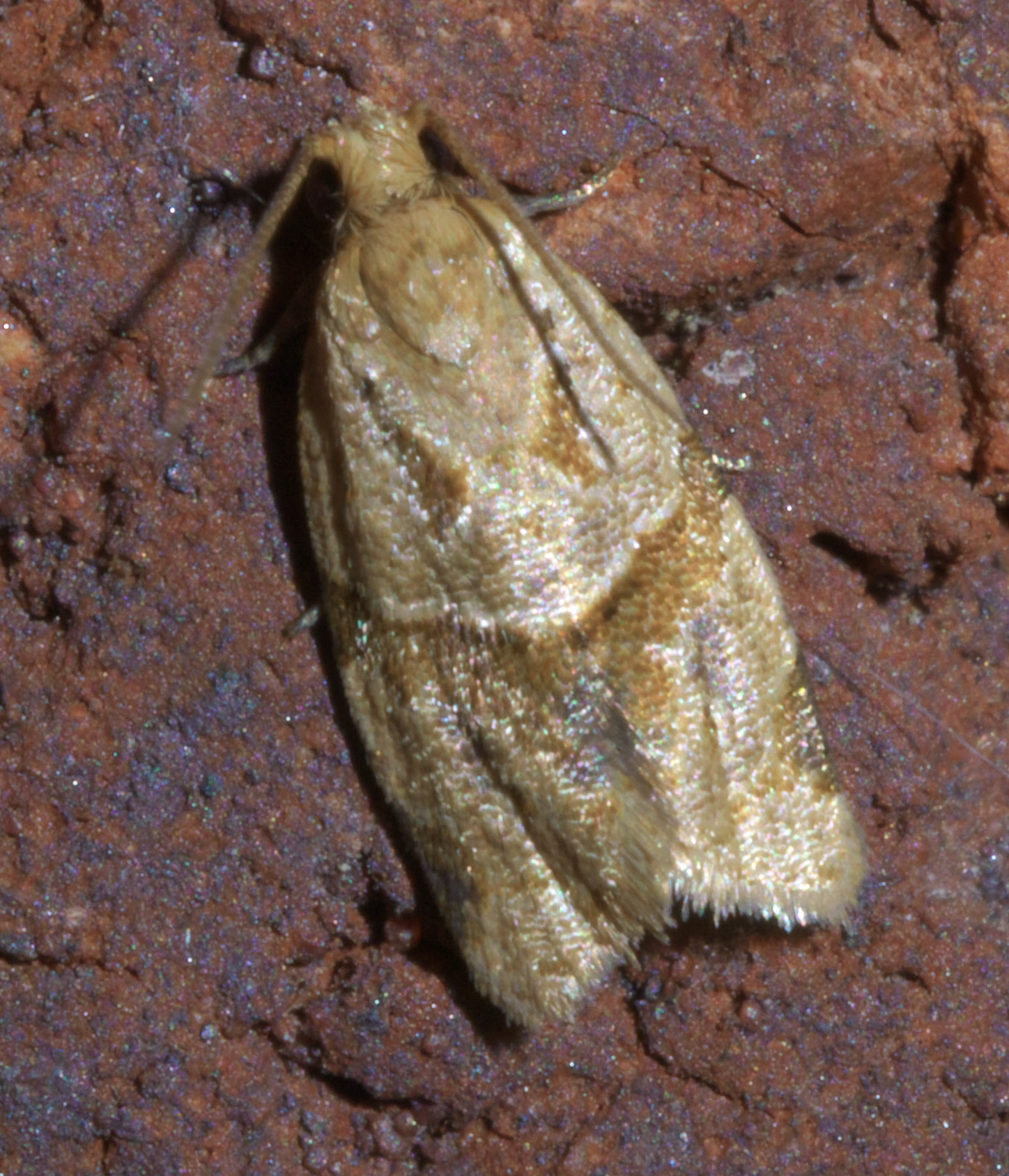
Platynota

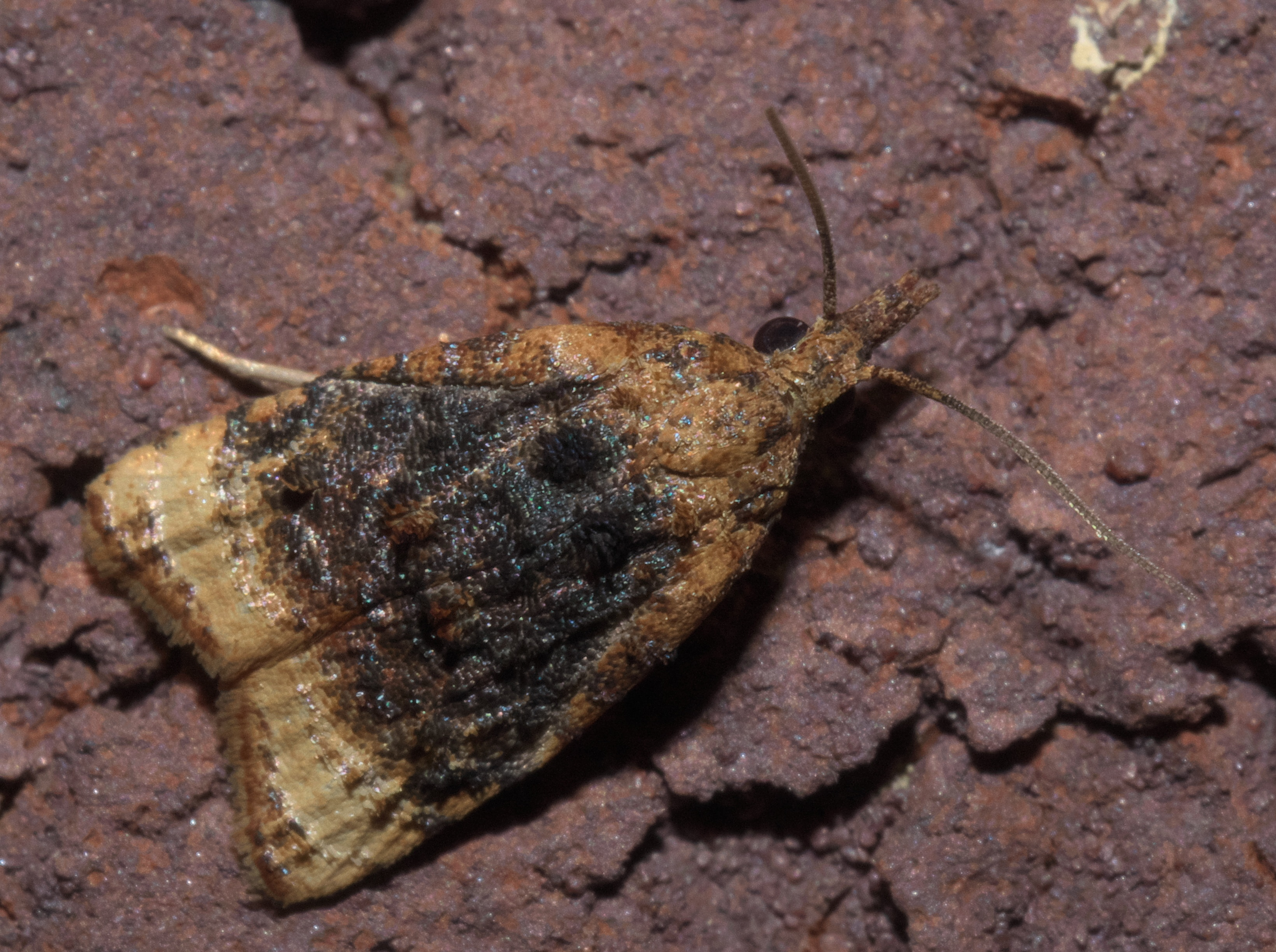
Platynota flavedana, black-shaded platynota moth, size: 8.5 mm

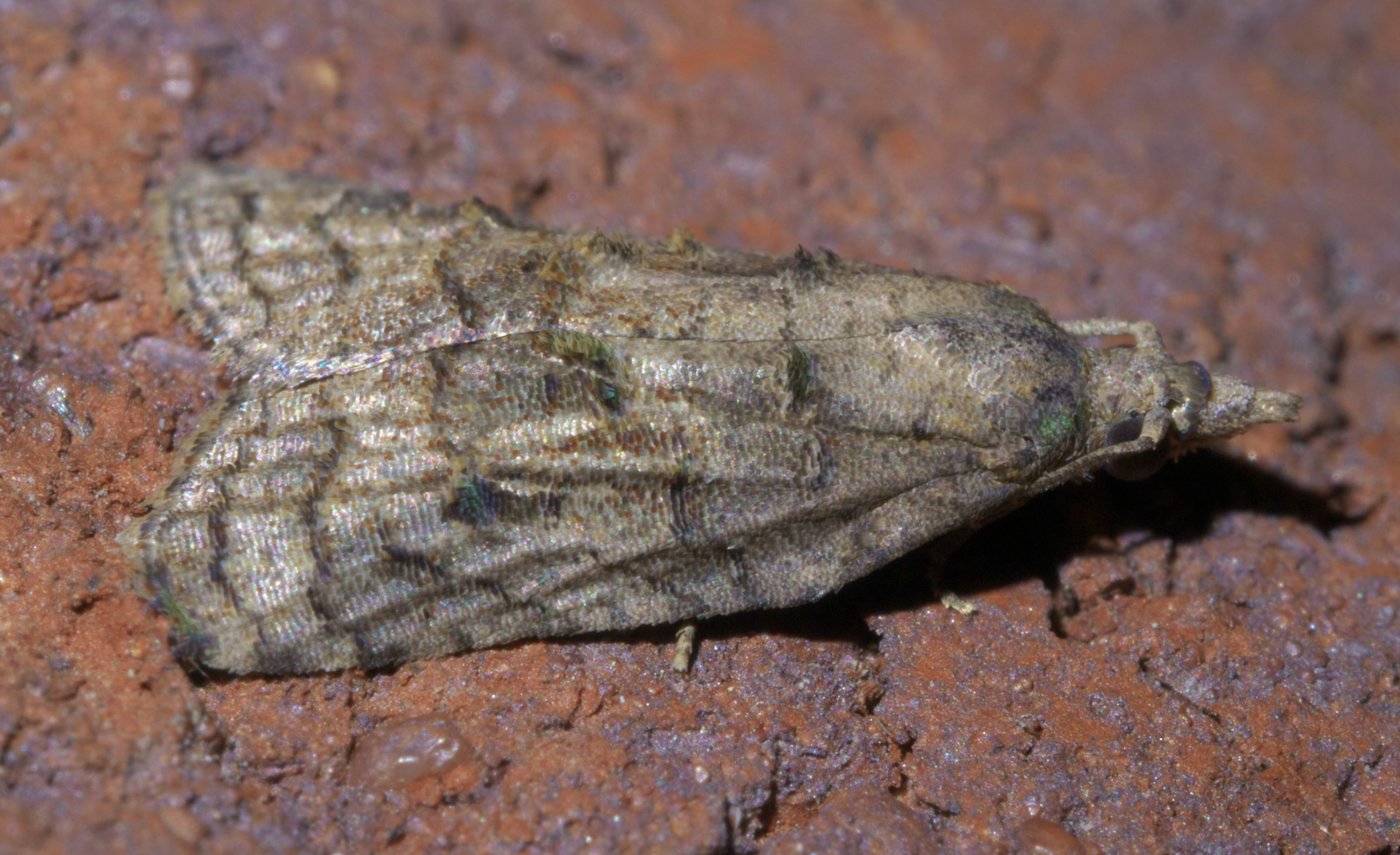
Platynota idaeusalis, tufted apple bud moth, size: 10.3 mm

Platynota is a genus of moths belonging to the subfamily Tortricinae of the family Tortricidae.

== Species ==
- Platynota blanchardi Powell & Brown, 2012
- Platynota breviplicana Walsingham, 1897
- Platynota calidana (Zeller, 1877)
- Platynota capella Walsingham, 1913
- Platynota colobota Meyrick, 1926
- Platynota egana (Walker, 1866)
- Platynota exasperatana (Zeller, 1875)
- Platynota flavedana Clemens, 1860
- Platynota helianthes (Meyrick, 1932)
- Platynota idaeusalis (Walker, 1859)
- Platynota illuminata (Meyrick, 1917)
- Platynota islameconae Powell & Brown, 2012
- Platynota labiosana (Zeller, 1875)
- Platynota larreana (Comstock, 1939)
- Platynota meridionalis Brown, 2013
- Platynota nigrocervina Walsingham, 1895
- Platynota obliqua Walsingham, 1913
- Platynota offuscata Walsingham, 1913
- Platynota polingi Powell & Brown, 2012
- Platynota redingtonensis Powell & Brown, 2012
- Platynota restitutana (Walker, 1863)
- Platynota rostrana (Walker, 1863)
- Platynota semiustana Walsingham, 1884
- Platynota stultana Walsingham, 1884
- Platynota subacida (Meyrick, 1917)
- Platynota subargentea Walsingham, 1913
- Platynota subtinae Brown, 2013
- Platynota texana Powell & Brown, 2012
- Platynota viridana Barnes & Busck, 1920
- Platynota wenzelana (Haimbach, 1915)
- Platynota xylophaea (Meyrick, 1912)
- Platynota yumana (Kearfott, 1907)
- Platynota zapatana Powell & Brown, 2012
- Platynota zymogramma (Meyrick, 1926)

== See also ==
- List of Tortricidae genera
