= Platynota offuscata =

Scientific classification
- Domain: Eukaryota
- Kingdom: Animalia
- Phylum: Arthropoda
- Class: Insecta
- Order: Lepidoptera
- Family: Tortricidae
- Genus: Platynota
- Species: P. offuscata

Binomial name
- Platynota offuscata Walsingham, 1913

Species of moth

Platynota offuscata is a species of moth of the family Tortricidae. It is found in Guatemala.

The wingspan is 15.5–19 mm. The forewings are almost entirely suffused with brown and dark brownish fuscous, the latter colour, although partially mottled with paler shades, occupying the whole space above the basal half of the fold, from which it runs in an oblique line to the costa, forming a large elongate triangular patch. The fold itself is narrowly stained with rust brown, and in the paler space beyond the dark triangle are spots of raised scales - one in the fold brownish ochreous. The hindwings are greyish fuscous.
