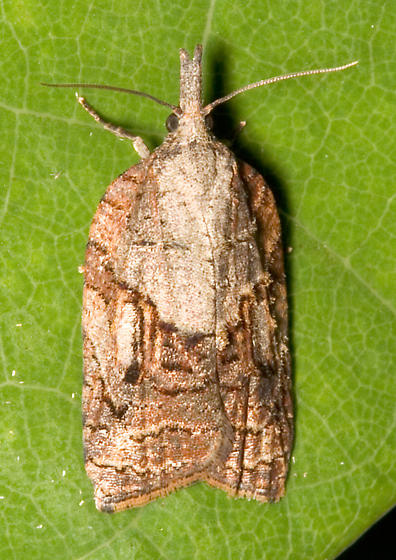

Scientific classification
- Kingdom: Animalia
- Phylum: Arthropoda
- Class: Insecta
- Order: Lepidoptera
- Family: Tortricidae
- Genus: Platynota
- Species: P. idaeusalis

Binomial name
- Platynota idaeusalis (Walker, 1859)

Synonyms
- Hypena idaeusalis Walker, 1859; Phylacteritis dioptrica Meyrick, 1922; Platynota sentana Clemens, 1860

= Platynota idaeusalis =

Species of moth

Platynota idaeusalis, the tufted apple bud moth, is a moth of the family Tortricidae. It is found in eastern North America, from Ontario, south to Florida, west to Oklahoma.

The wingspan is 12–25 mm. Adults are on wing from June to July in the north. There are multiple generations per year.
