= Platynota subacida =

Scientific classification
- Kingdom: Animalia
- Phylum: Arthropoda
- Class: Insecta
- Order: Lepidoptera
- Family: Tortricidae
- Genus: Platynota
- Species: P. subacida

Binomial name
- Platynota subacida (Meyrick, 1917)

Synonyms
- Sparganothis subacida Meyrick, 1917

Species of moth

Platynota subacida is a species of moth of the family Tortricidae. It is found in French Guiana.
