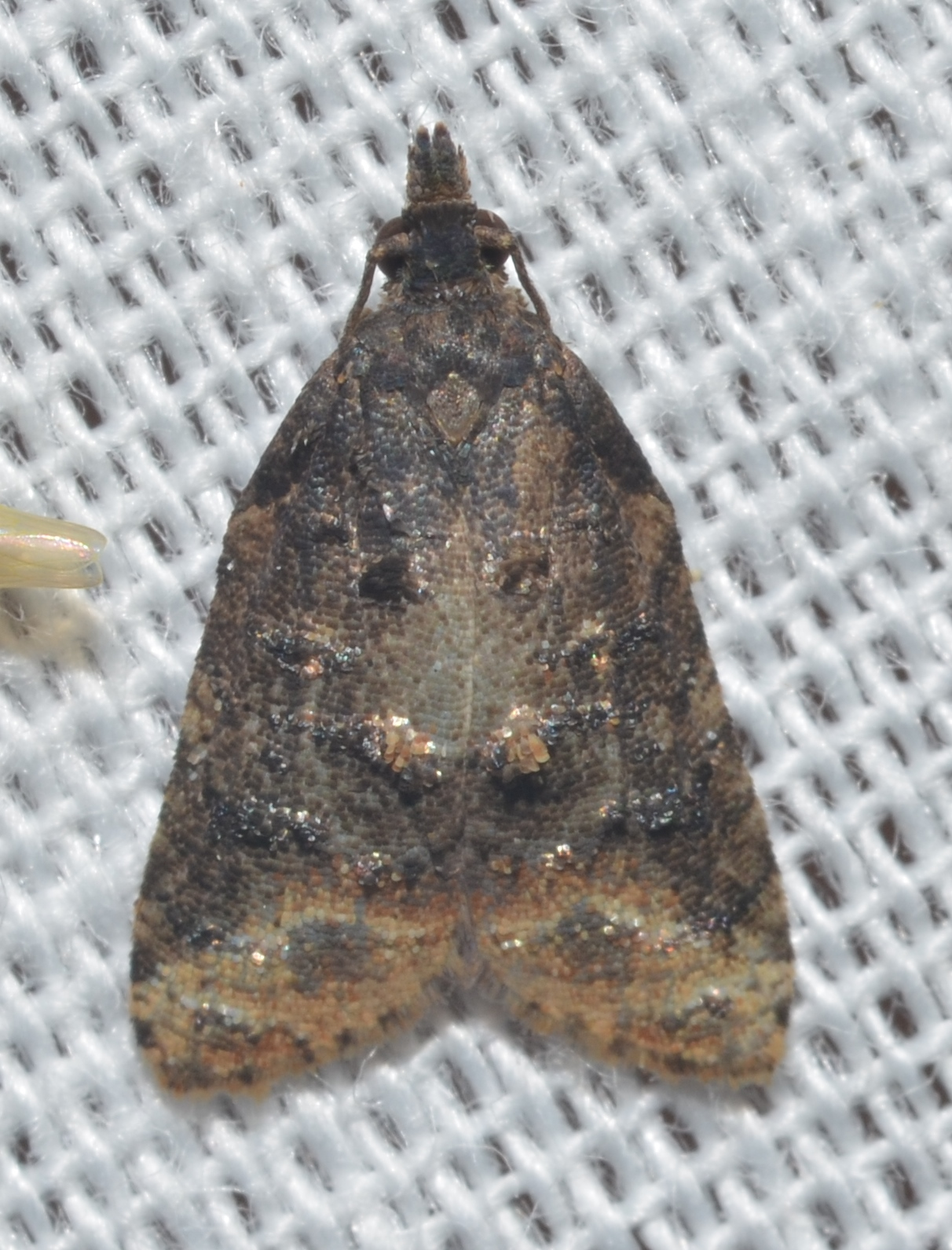
- Platynota semiustana

Scientific classification
- Domain: Eukaryota
- Kingdom: Animalia
- Phylum: Arthropoda
- Class: Insecta
- Order: Lepidoptera
- Family: Tortricidae
- Genus: Platynota
- Species: P. semiustana

Binomial name
- Platynota semiustana Walsingham, 1884

= Platynota semiustana =

Species of moth

Platynota semiustana, the singed platynota, is a species of moth of the family Tortricidae. It is found in North America, where it has been recorded from Alabama, Arkansas, Delaware, Florida, Georgia, Maine, North Carolina, Oklahoma, South Carolina, Tennessee and Texas.

The wingspan is 13–17 mm. The forewings are sooty black with a paler terminal line.
