= Platynota capella =

Scientific classification
- Domain: Eukaryota
- Kingdom: Animalia
- Phylum: Arthropoda
- Class: Insecta
- Order: Lepidoptera
- Family: Tortricidae
- Genus: Platynota
- Species: P. capella

Binomial name
- Platynota capella Walsingham, 1913

Species of moth

Platynota capella is a species of moth of the family Tortricidae. It is found in Guatemala.

The wingspan is 21–24 mm.
