= Platynota obliqua =

Scientific classification
- Domain: Eukaryota
- Kingdom: Animalia
- Phylum: Arthropoda
- Class: Insecta
- Order: Lepidoptera
- Family: Tortricidae
- Genus: Platynota
- Species: P. obliqua

Binomial name
- Platynota obliqua Walsingham, 1913

Species of moth

Platynota obliqua is a species of moth of the family Tortricidae. It is found in Mexico (Tabasco) and Costa Rica.

The wingspan is about 16 mm.
