= Platynota blanchardi =

Scientific classification
- Kingdom: Animalia
- Phylum: Arthropoda
- Clade: Pancrustacea
- Class: Insecta
- Order: Lepidoptera
- Family: Tortricidae
- Genus: Platynota
- Species: P. blanchardi

Binomial name
- Platynota blanchardi Powell & Brown, 2012

Species of moth

Platynota blanchardi is a species of moth of the family Tortricidae. It is found in the United States in Arizona and Texas.

The wingspan is 19–20 mm.
