= Platynota calidana =

Scientific classification
- Kingdom: Animalia
- Phylum: Arthropoda
- Clade: Pancrustacea
- Class: Insecta
- Order: Lepidoptera
- Family: Tortricidae
- Genus: Platynota
- Species: P. calidana

Binomial name
- Platynota calidana (Zeller, 1877)

Synonyms
- Cerorrhineta calidana Zeller, 1877

Species of moth

Platynota calidana is a species of moth of the family Tortricidae. It is found on Cuba and in Florida in the United States.

The wingspan is about 15 mm.
