= Platynota colobota =

Scientific classification
- Kingdom: Animalia
- Phylum: Arthropoda
- Class: Insecta
- Order: Lepidoptera
- Family: Tortricidae
- Genus: Platynota
- Species: P. colobota

Binomial name
- Platynota colobota Meyrick, 1926

Species of moth

Platynota colobota is a species of moth of the family Tortricidae. It is found on the Galapagos Islands.
