= Platynota egana =

Scientific classification
- Kingdom: Animalia
- Phylum: Arthropoda
- Class: Insecta
- Order: Lepidoptera
- Family: Tortricidae
- Genus: Platynota
- Species: P. egana

Binomial name
- Platynota egana (Walker, 1866)

Synonyms
- Teras egana Walker, 1866

Species of moth

Platynota egana is a species of moth of the family Tortricidae. It is found in Brazil.
