= Colegio del Verbo Divino =

School in Chile

Coordinates: 33.421126°S 70.586048°W

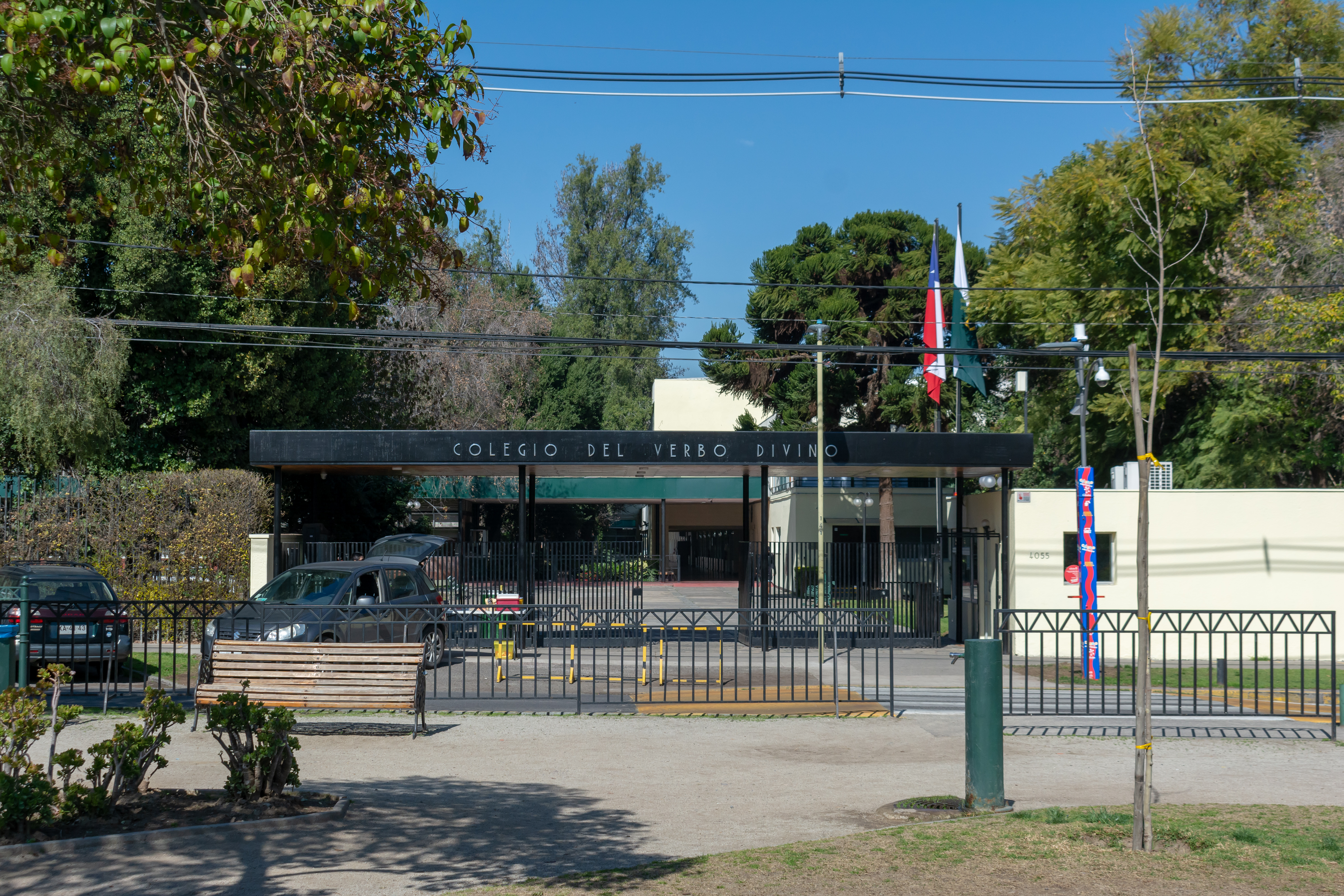
- The Colegio del Verbo Divino in 2023

Location
- Presidente Errázuriz 4055; Santiago; Metropolitan; Las Condes; Chile

Information
- Religious affiliation: Catholic
- Founded: 1950
- Founder: Congregación del Verbo Divino
- Head of school: R.P. Sergio A. Edwards Velasco, svd
- Website: http://www.cvd.cl/

Colegio del Verbo Divino ("College of the Divine Word" in Spanish) is a school in Chile catering to grades from pre-kindergarten through 12th grade (cuarto medio). It was founded in 1950 by the Congregación del Verbo Divino (Society of the Divine Word), which continues administration of the school to the present day. The organization and school's mission is that of forming leaders of the Catholic viewpoint, who will work to contribute social justice and solidarity.

The all-boys school is located in the neighbourhood of El Golf within the municipality of Las Condes. The school is recognized for its academic excellence and competitive sports teams, such as track and field and soccer. Many affluent Chileans, including politicians, economists, businessmen, entrepreneurs, scientists, artists, and sportsmen, have passed through its doors, including former president Sebastián Piñera.
