= José Ignacio Urbieta =

Spanish artist, footballer, and manager

Personal information
- Full name: José Ignacio Urbieta Egaña
- Date of birth: 12 December 1915
- Place of birth: Deba, Gipuzkoa, Spain
- Date of death: 17 May 1999 (aged 83)
- Position: Defender

Senior career*
Years	Team	Apps	(Gls)
1940–1942	Deportivo Alavés		
1942–1946	Real Sociedad		
?	CA Osasuna		

Managerial career
- 1951–1955: Real Sociedad
- 1955–1957: Real Murcia
- 1957–1958: Las Palmas
- 1958–1959: Barakaldo CF
- 1959–1960: CD Tenerife
- 1961–1962: SD Indautxu
- * Club domestic league appearances and goals

José Ignacio Urbieta Egaña (12 December 1915 – 17 May 1999) was a Spanish artist, footballer who played as a defender for Deportivo Alavés and Real Sociedad, and later a manager, taking charge of Real Sociedad, Real Murcia, and Las Palmas in the 1950s.

Although known for his sports activities carried out between 1942 and 1958, the most notable in his public performance were his artistic works, most notably the manufacture of figures of giants and big heads for popular festivals.

== Early life and education ==
José Ignacio Urbieta was born on 12 December 1915 in Deba, Gipuzkoa, as the son of local merchants. He studied at the Salesianos school of Sarriá in Barcelona, where he met Simón Berasaluce, a master glassmaker, four years older.

== Footballing career ==
=== Playing career ===
After the Spanish Civil War ended in 1939, the 24-year-old Urbieta immersed himself in the world of football, playing football with Deportivo Alavés from 1940 to 1942, and then with Real Sociedad. When he joined Alavés in 1940, the club already had partly rebuilt its eleven with professional players, and although Urbieta played as an amateur that year, he played an important role in helping his side achieve promotion to the Segunda División. For instance, after a match against UD Logroñés in Las Gaunas, the press defined him as "magnificent at all times, full of play and splendid conductor of the Vitorian attacking line". In the following year, Deportivo once again had a good campaign, occupying third place in their Second Division group, tied with Real Zaragoza, with Urbieta playing 13 of the 14 League games and on occasions, as happened against his future club CA Osasuna, he was "the best player from Vitoria".

Urbieta made his debut with Sociedad in a 1942 Copa del Rey first-round match against Arenas de Getxo on 26 April. He stayed with the club for four years until 1946, playing a total of 67 official matches and scoring only once. He retired from football as an Osasuna player.

=== Managerial career ===
After his career as a player ended, Urbieta remained linked to Real Sociedad, now as a manager, which he coached for four seasons between 1951 and 1955, all of which in the first division. In total, he oversaw 142 matches (120 in the league, 14 in the cup, and 10 in promotion play-offs) with a balance of 50 wins, 62 losses, and 30 draws, and with 243 goals and 267 conceded.

Urbieta later coached Murcia for two seasons between 1955 and 1957. He also coached one season for Las Palmas (1957–58), Barakaldo CF (1958–59), CD Tenerife (1959–60), and SD Indautxu (1961–62). He is one of only 10 managers to have coached both Las Palmas and Tenerife, eleven games in charge of the former in the First Division, and 14 with the latter in the second division. Notably, he was fired from Tenerife with a simple phone call by the club's president Ricardo Hodgson Lecuona on 29 December 1959. With permission from the club to spend the Christmas holidays at home, Urbieta traveled to his hometown of Deba by road, but he failed to return for the match against Plus Ultra due to bad weather which closed the Bilbao airport and made the telephone useless. When Urbieta's telegram arrived, Hodgson had already decided on his dismissal, having been pleased by Tenerife's decent performance against Plus Ultra, so on the next day, in an "extraordinary and urgent" meeting of the board of directors, it was agreed to dismiss him, but there was no way to contact him other than by phone: "José Ignacio, you don't need to come back. You are fired".

== Artistic career ==
Outside of football, Urbieta was an artist, decorator, and illustrator, having a workshop studio in San Sebastián, Vitoria-Gasteiz, and Deba, where he made the restoration of the sacristy of the parish church of Deba, and the dome of that of Berriatua. His skills were also applied to street entertainment, especially for popular festivals, as he manufactured figures of giants and big heads, built floats, designed costumes, and sometimes staged traditional bar legends. He mastered a notable number of techniques, including molding, having cast some of his figures in the well-known Capa workshop in Arganda (Madrid) and at the Deba Art School.

In the late 1980s, Urbieta intensified his activity as a manufacturer and restorer of giants and big heads, basically using traditional techniques, although his permanent desire for innovation led him to also use fiberglass. Although there is no complete catalog of his works, he designed, manufactured, and repaired several festive figures for the City Councils of San Sebastián, Bilbao, Oñati, Lekeitio, and Mondragón-Arrasate, such as Gargantúa. His giants for Deba representing José Izaga "Pepe Izaga" and Carlos Alcibar "Carlosmonte", which were unanimously praised for their realism and excellent finish that characterized all of his work. Urbieta was also a renowned specialist in the repair and in some cases updating of giants, big heads and similar figures.

He received various tributes and recognitions from troupes of giants and bigheads, among other places, in San Sebastián and Deba.

== Death ==
Urbieta married María Teresa Egaña, and the couple had several children.

Urbieta died on 17 May 1999, at the age of 83.

== Honours ==
Real Sociedad

- Segunda División:
  - Winners (1) 1942–43
