= Jaime Egaña =

Chilean politician, businessman and diplomat (1920–2000)

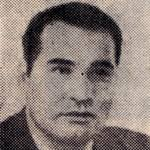
- Official portrait, 1950s

Ambassador of Chile to Paraguay
- In office 1961–1964
- President: Jorge Alessandri

Member of the Chamber of Deputies
- In office 15 May 1953 – 15 May 1961
- Constituency: 7th Departmental Grouping (Santiago, First District)

Personal details
- Born: Jaime Antonio Egaña Baraona; 6 January 1920 Santiago, Chile
- Died: 22 August 2000 (aged 80) Santiago, Chile
- Party: Conservative Party; National Party
- Spouse: Pilar Respaldiza (m. 1944)
- Children: 6
- Relatives: Rodrigo Egaña (nephew)
- Education: Pontifical Catholic University of Chile
- Occupation: Politician; businessman; real estate broker

Jaime Antonio Egaña Baraona (6 January 1920 – 22 August 2000) was a Chilean politician, businessman and diplomat. A member of the Conservative Party, he later joined the National Party.

Egaña served as Deputy of the Republic for the 7th Departmental Grouping (Santiago, First District) between 1953 and 1961 and was Chile's Ambassador to Paraguay from 1961 to 1964.

== Early life and education ==
Egaña was born in Santiago on 6 January 1920, the son of Alfredo Egaña Pinto and María Concepción Baraona Fornes. He married Pilar Respaldiza Sanfuentes on 21 October 1944, with whom he had six children: Jaime, Andrés Egaña, Alfredo, María del Pilar, María Macarena, and José Antonio.

He completed his secondary education at the Instituto Alonso de Ercilla, Liceo Alemán, and Colegio San Ignacio, and later studied commerce at the Pontifical Catholic University of Chile.

== Professional career ==
Egaña began his career as an insurance broker at *Organización Kappes* and later joined the real estate office of Carlos Ossandón. In 1942, he founded his own firm, Egaña y Compañía, later known as Jaime Egaña B. y Cía. Ltda., and subsequently Egaña y Valenzuela Propiedades. He also directed Radio Santiago and the newspaper El Chileno.

He was a founding member of the Real Estate Brokers’ Union (Sindicato de Corredores de Propiedades, today ACOP) and served as a national councillor of the Sociedad de Fomento Fabril (SOFOFA).

== Political career ==
Egaña joined the Conservative Party in 1937 and became an active figure within its youth wing, serving on the National Board of the Traditionalist Conservative Youth. He was president of local and provincial party boards and later a member of the national executive.

He was elected councilman (regidor) of the Municipality of Santiago for the terms 1947–1950, 1950–1953, and again in 1967. He presided over the Municipal Patent Classification Board and represented Chile at various International Congresses of Municipalities.

In 1953, he was elected Deputy for the 7th Departmental Grouping (Santiago, First District), and was re-elected in 1957. During his two legislative periods (1953–1961), he served on the Permanent Commissions of National Defense and of Internal Government, Police, and Regulations.

In 1961, President Jorge Alessandri Rodríguez appointed him as Chile's Ambassador to Paraguay, a post he held until 1964, strengthening bilateral relations between the two countries.

== Public and civic life ==
Beyond his political and professional roles, Egaña was actively engaged in civic and sporting organizations. He was honorary volunteer of the Santiago Fire Department and the 5th Company, founder and president of the Instituto Paraguayo de Cultura, and founder and vice president of the Club Social Deportivo Santa Rosa de Las Condes.

Egaña served on the Penalties Tribunal of the Chilean Football Association (ANFP) and helped establish the Polla Gol football betting system, organizing the first “Copa Campeones” championship.

He was a member of the Club de la Unión, Polo Club San Cristóbal, Círculo Español, Universidad Católica D.C., Santiago Morning, and Green Cross football clubs. He collaborated regularly with the press on sports topics.

Egaña was decorated with the Gran Cruz Extraordinaria al Mérito by the Republic of Paraguay, and awarded the Medalla al Mérito Deportivo by Colo-Colo.
