= María Margarita Egaña Fernández =

Cuban architect (1921–1975)

- Born: 14 December 1921; Havana, Cuba
- Died: 17 August 1975 (aged 53); Santurce, San Juan, Puerto Rico
- Other names: Margarita Egaña, María Margarita Egaña de Ravelo
- Occupation: architect
- Years active: 1940–1968
- Known for: Modernism

María Margarita Egaña Fernández (14 December 1921 – 17 August 1975) was a Cuban architect who flourished in the 1950s. Her work is characterized by the trend of the era to fuse traditional Cuban architectural styles with modern functionality. Typically she designed single-family housing for middle- to upper-class clients. She was among the first generation of women to freely be able to practice their craft and is remembered as a pioneer of Modern Architecture in Cuba.

== Early life ==
María Margarita Egaña Fernández was born on 14 December 1921 in Havana, Cuba (Note: Egaña's death certificate gives her date of birth as 15 December 1922; however no informant of the information is listed. Lora's date was supplied by her husband and is given precedence.) to Herminia Fernández and Manuel Egaña. She began her studies in architecture in 1940 at the University of Havana and received her degree in 1947. While she was in school, she met fellow architecture student, Javier Francisco Ravelo Meneses, whom she would marry in Havana on 7 February 1948. Immediately, the couple moved to Santiago de Cuba and registered with the Architects Association of the East (AAE), where Javier received license #31 and Margarita received license #32.

== Career ==
The couple immediately began working for Ravelo's father, Francisco Ravelo Repilado, in his studio. Later they opened their own firm, Estudio Egaña-Ravelo, which they operated from the ground floor of a building Egaña designed located in the neighborhood Ampliación de Terrazas #155. Though the business was a joint endeavor, Egaña maintained her independence, with a style of her own. During this time, the couple had three daughters and Ravelo became president of the AAE. Egaña served as a delegate to the National Assembly of Cuba between 1953 and 1956 and was vocal about her political opinions. This was simultaneously her most productive period as an architect.

Egaña typically worked on single-family dwellings for middle to upper class clients. Her work attempted to fuse the traditional Cuban style of Santiago, which had been adapted to climatic constraints, with modern functionality. Her dwellings predominantly featured flat roofs atop banks of horizontally-running, glazed windows and utilized natural materials to soften the industrial rigidity of the style and allow light and air to enter. Jointly with Revalo, Egaña built around seventy homes, of which a few were located in the city center, or neighborhoods of Santa Bárbara or Raja Yoga, but most were in the eastern part of the city. Several planned urban communities, like Ampliación de Terrazas, Fomento, Terrazas de Vista Alegre and Vista Alegre, expanded Santiago eastward and were the focus of the majority of Egaña's works.

These eastern suburban areas were built on a grid pattern, unlike the traditional city, and planned to utilize the water systems of San Juan and link the area to the village of El Caney. Individual plots surrounded shared green spaces, with a community pool and playground and visual barriers to the traffic on the main road arteries. They were the first manifestations of the Modern Movement and buildings utilized new technology and a variety of styles, but all were typically built using a skeleton structure with inverted and embedded beams and inclined reinforced-concrete, flat roofs with slight inclines on broken levels. Egaña's style was formal, but functional, integrating technology, visual effects.

In 1961, Egaña and her daughters left Cuba for Puerto Rico. They settled in Río Piedras, where they were joined in 1963 by Ravelo. She began being treated for cancer in 1968.

== Death and legacy ==
Egaña died on 17 August 1975 at Doctor's Hospital of Santurce, San Juan, Puerto Rico after a lengthy battle with cancer. She was buried the following day at Borinquen Memorial Cemetery in Caguas, Puerto Rico. Egaña is remembered as one of the pioneering modernist architects of Cuba and one of the first generation of women architects to fully be allowed to participate in the field.

== Selected projects ==
- 102 Aguilera, at the corner Siboney Road in the neighborhood of Terrazas
- 119 Calle Anacaona, at the corner with Taíno in the neighborhood of Terrazas
- 207 Calle 11, between Marcané and Bravo Correoso streets in the neighborhood of Santa Bárbara
- 209 Calle 4, in the neighborhood of Vista Alegre
- 307 Calle M, between C and 5th streets in the neighborhood of Ampliación de Terrazas
- 318 Calle I, between the Avenue of the Americas and 6th streets in the neighborhood of Sueño
- 322 Calle I, between the Avenue of the Americas and 6th streets in the neighborhood of Sueño
- 357 Calle M, between 7th and 9th streets in the neighborhood of Ampliación de Terrazas
- 358 Calle 17, between Raja Yoga and A street in the neighborhood of Raja Yoga
