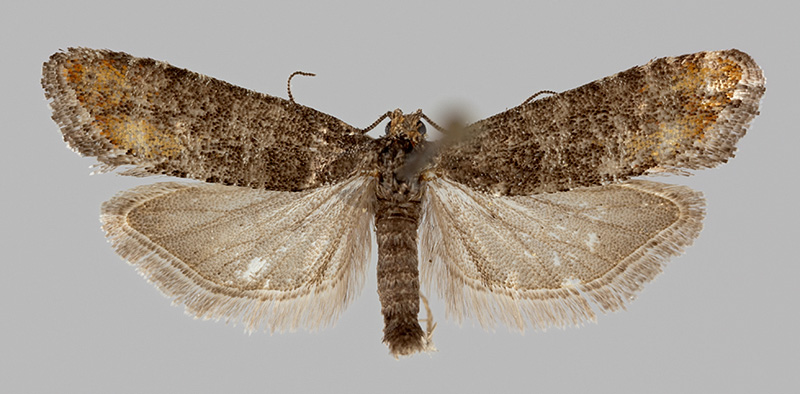

Scientific classification
- Kingdom: Animalia
- Phylum: Arthropoda
- Clade: Pancrustacea
- Class: Insecta
- Order: Lepidoptera
- Family: Tortricidae
- Genus: Rhyacionia
- Species: R. logaea

Binomial name
- Rhyacionia logaea John Hartley Durrant, 1911

= Rhyacionia logaea =

Species of moth

Rhyacionia logaea, the Elgin shoot moth (Swedish Cilierad tallvecklare), is a species of moth belonging to the family Tortricidae. It was previously considered a subspecies of Rhyacionia duplana, the summer shoot moth. It is now considered the sister species of R. duplana.

Its discovery is attributed to English entomologist John Hartley Durrant, F.E.S., who contributed his findings of the species R. logaea and R. duplana to the Trustees of the British Museum in 1911. The Elgin shoot moth is considered to be a micro-moth.

== Description ==
The Elgin shoot moth has an approximate length of 9 mm (0.35 inches) and a wingspan ranging from 14 – 18 mm (0.55 - 0.71 inches), with an average wingspan of 16 mm (0.63 inches). Its thorax is dark with ashy spots.

Its forewings are long and pointed, with nearly straight costa whose inferior is oblique to its thorax, and are dark with white-tipped scales, and ashy fasciae that appear rusty near the superior and inferior, but not near the corners. Its hindwings may share the same dark base colouration as the forewings or may be lighter, but have pale, long cilia, and their bases are divided by a darker line.

Male antennae are biciliate and ash-grey with mixed dark colouration, while female antennae are wholly dark. The antennae of male Elgin shoot moths are longer than those of males of the summer shoot moth, with cilia twice as long. The palpi and face are both dark, while the rest of the head may be more rust-coloured.

The abdomen of the Elgin shoot moth is dark with ashen bands, and its legs are ashy with rusty spots on its tarsi. The genitalia of the Elgin shoot moth and the summer shoot moth are nearly identical.

== Habitat ==
The Elgin shoot moth is native to Northern Europe, and while previously believed to be restricted to the coniferous forests of North-East Scotland, observations show that it may also be found in the regions of Denmark (except for the Faroe Islands and Greenland), Estonia, Finland (except for Åland), Germany, Great Britain (in England, Scotland, and Wales, but not Northern Ireland), Latvia, Norway (except for Svalbard and Jan Mayen), the European part of Russia (to Manych lowlands), and Sweden.

== Etymology ==
The Elgin shoot moth is named after the Scottish town of Elgin. Elgin is theorized to have Celtic origin, potentially deriving from the word Aille, meaning beauty. As these moths burrow into young shoots of various species of pine and spruce trees during their larval stage, this is likely the origin of the Elgin shoot moth's name.

== Life cycle ==
While not much is known about the full life cycle of R. logaea, they undergo a process of holometabolism (complete metamorphosis) alike that of other moths.

=== Mating ===
Elgin shoot moths have not been observed during mating processes, but current documentation implies this takes place during April, after which eggs are laid. There are, however, documented dissections of R. logaea genitalia.

=== Larva ===
Larval Elgin shoot moth caterpillars parasitically feed on the buds and shoots of the Scots pine (Pinus sylvestris), Lodgepole pine (Pinus contorta), and Sitka spruce (Picea sitchensis), causing deformation and withering damage to the trees they inhabit. They likely remain in their larval stage until late July.

=== Pupa ===
R. logaea enter a pupal stage during the month of August, hibernating through the winter until late March.

=== Imago ===
Adult R. logaea actively fly from mid-afternoon through the night, and can be seen from April through early May.

== Relationship with humans ==
R. logaea are a little-studied species of moth, knowledge of which was previously dispersed widely in scarce amounts prior to this page, primarily known for their parasitic relationship with pine trees.
