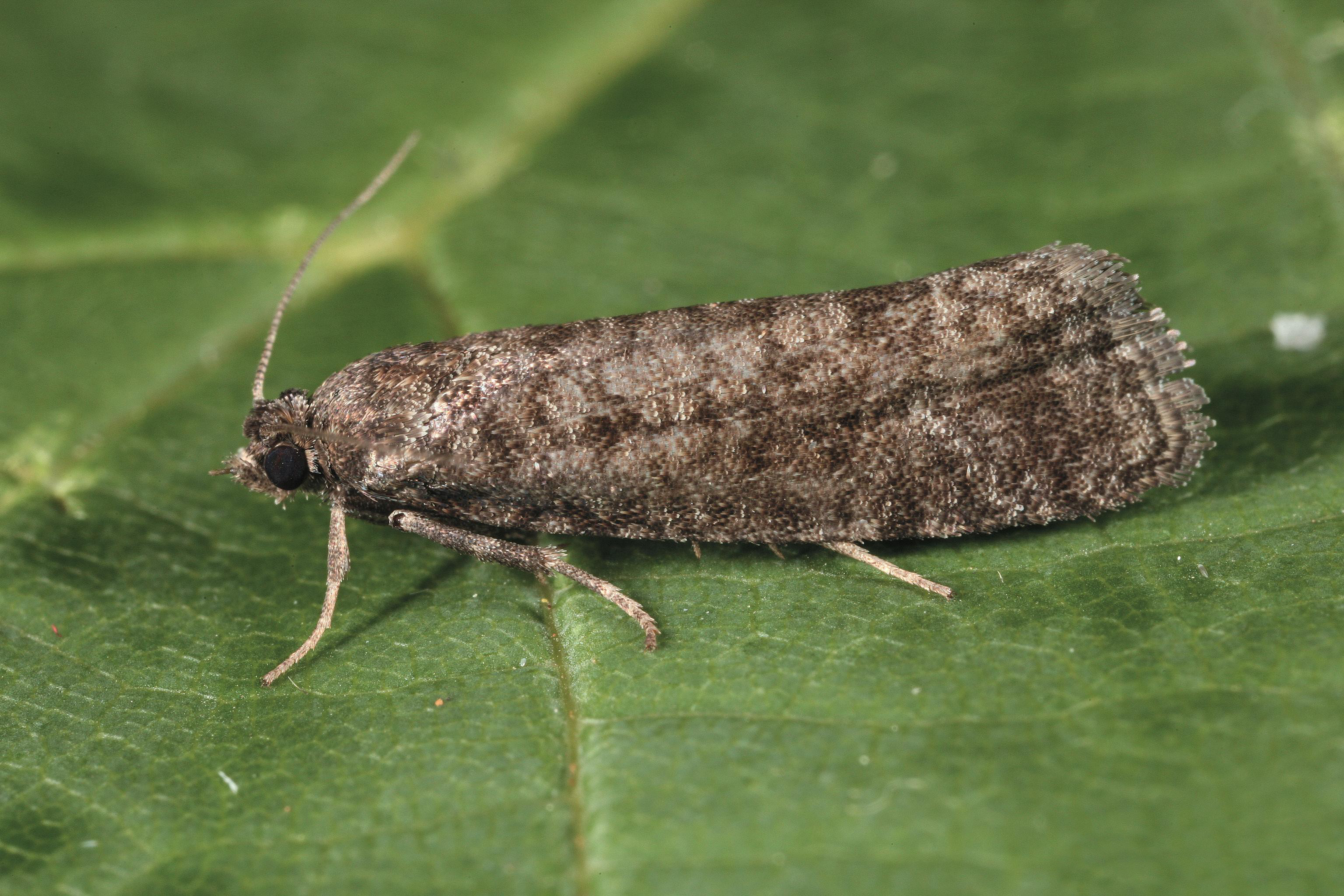

Scientific classification
- Kingdom: Animalia
- Phylum: Arthropoda
- Clade: Pancrustacea
- Class: Insecta
- Order: Lepidoptera
- Family: Tortricidae
- Genus: Rhyacionia
- Species: R. hafneri

Binomial name
- Rhyacionia hafneri (Rebel, 1937)

Synonyms
- Evetria hafneri Rebel, 1937

= Rhyacionia hafneri =

Species of moth

Rhyacionia hafneri is a species of moth of the family Tortricidae. It is found in the Czech Republic, Hungary, Croatia, Bulgaria and Slovenia.

The wingspan is 20–22 mm.

The larvae feed on Pinus nigra and possibly Pinus sylvestris.
