= Rhyacionia leptotubula =

Scientific classification
- Kingdom: Animalia
- Phylum: Arthropoda
- Clade: Pancrustacea
- Class: Insecta
- Order: Lepidoptera
- Family: Tortricidae
- Genus: Rhyacionia
- Species: R. leptotubula

Binomial name
- Rhyacionia leptotubula Liu & Bai, 1984

Species of moth

Rhyacionia leptotubula is a species of moth of the family Tortricidae. It is found in Heilongjiang and Yunnan in China.
