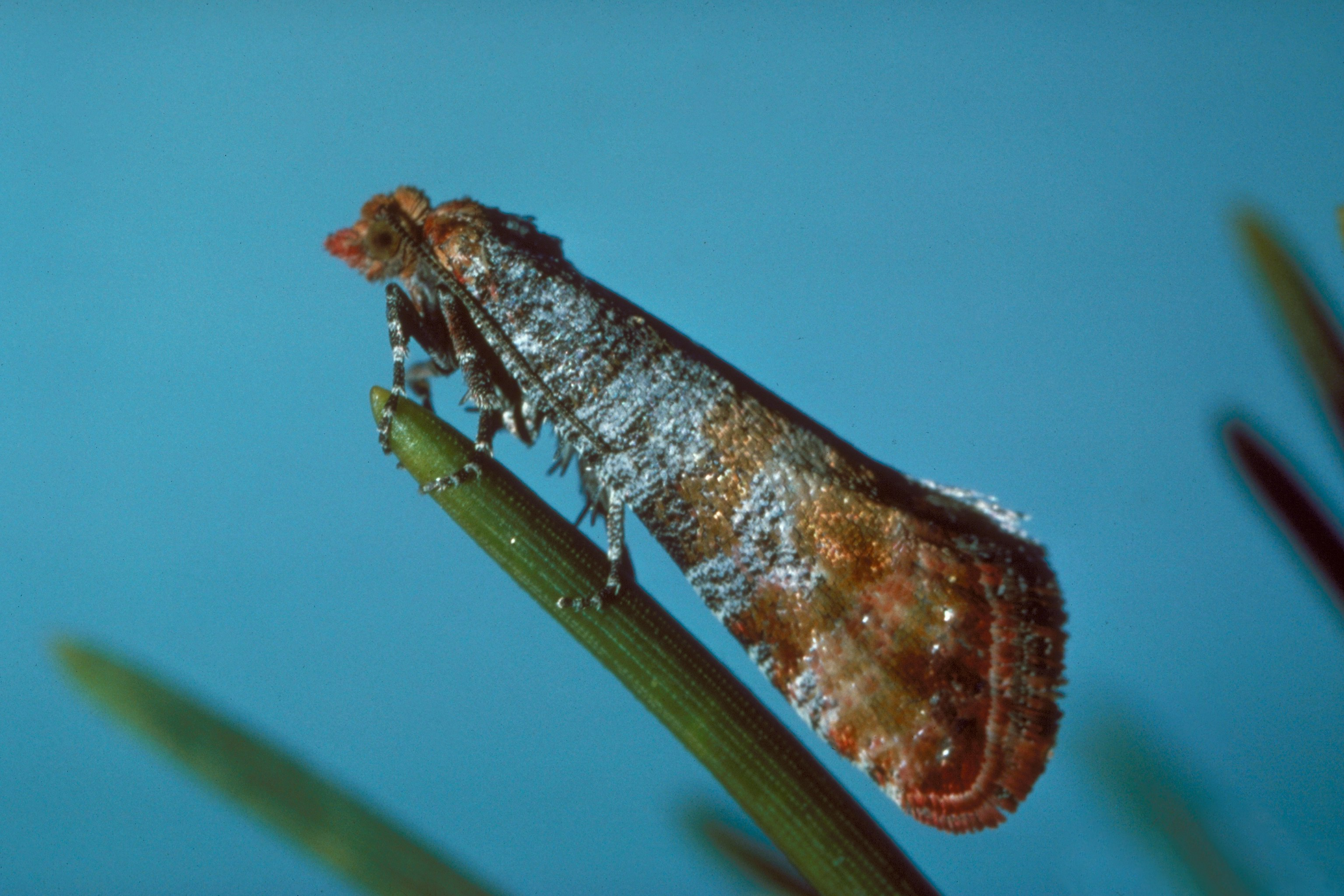

Scientific classification
- Domain: Eukaryota
- Kingdom: Animalia
- Phylum: Arthropoda
- Class: Insecta
- Order: Lepidoptera
- Family: Tortricidae
- Genus: Rhyacionia
- Species: R. bushnelli

Binomial name
- Rhyacionia bushnelli (Busck, 1914)

Synonyms
- Evetria bushnelli Busck, 1914

= Rhyacionia bushnelli =

Species of moth

Rhyacionia bushnelli, the western pine tip moth, is a moth of the family Tortricidae. It is found in the United States, including Alabama, Nebraska, North Dakota and Montana.

The wingspan is about 13 mm. There is usually one generation per year.

The larvae feed on the tips of Pinus species, including Pinus ponderosa.
