= Rhyacionia dolichotubula =

Scientific classification
- Domain: Eukaryota
- Kingdom: Animalia
- Phylum: Arthropoda
- Class: Insecta
- Order: Lepidoptera
- Family: Tortricidae
- Genus: Rhyacionia
- Species: R. dolichotubula

Binomial name
- Rhyacionia dolichotubula Liu & Bai, 1984

Species of moth

Rhyacionia dolichotubula is a species of moth of the family Tortricidae. It is found in Yunnan, China.
