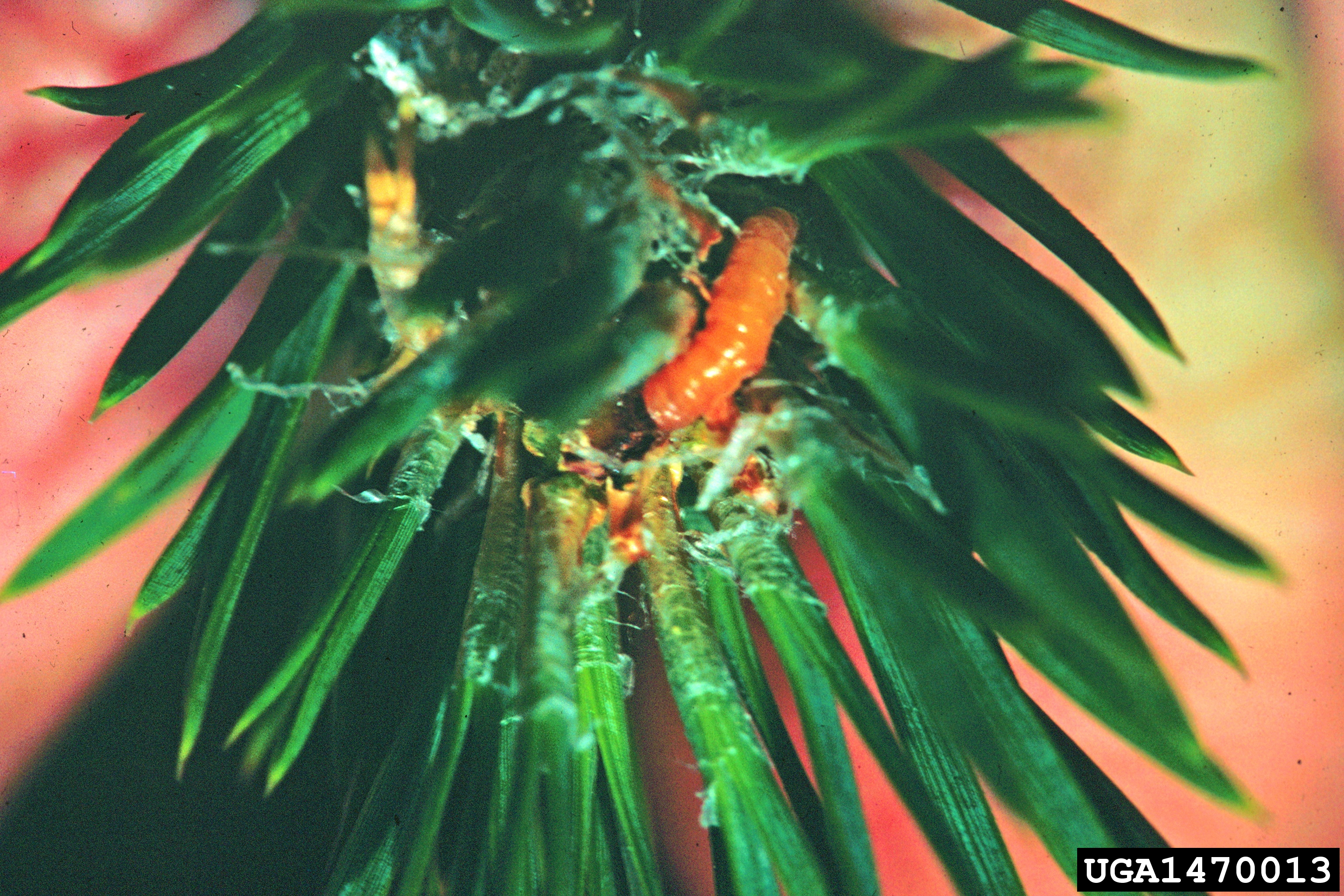
- Larva

Scientific classification
- Kingdom: Animalia
- Phylum: Arthropoda
- Class: Insecta
- Order: Lepidoptera
- Family: Tortricidae
- Genus: Rhyacionia
- Species: R. adana

Binomial name
- Rhyacionia adana Heinrich, 1923

= Rhyacionia adana =

Species of moth

Rhyacionia adana, the Adana tip moth, is a moth of the family Tortricidae. It is found in north-eastern North America, including Massachusetts, Pennsylvania, Virginia, Michigan, Wisconsin and Ontario.

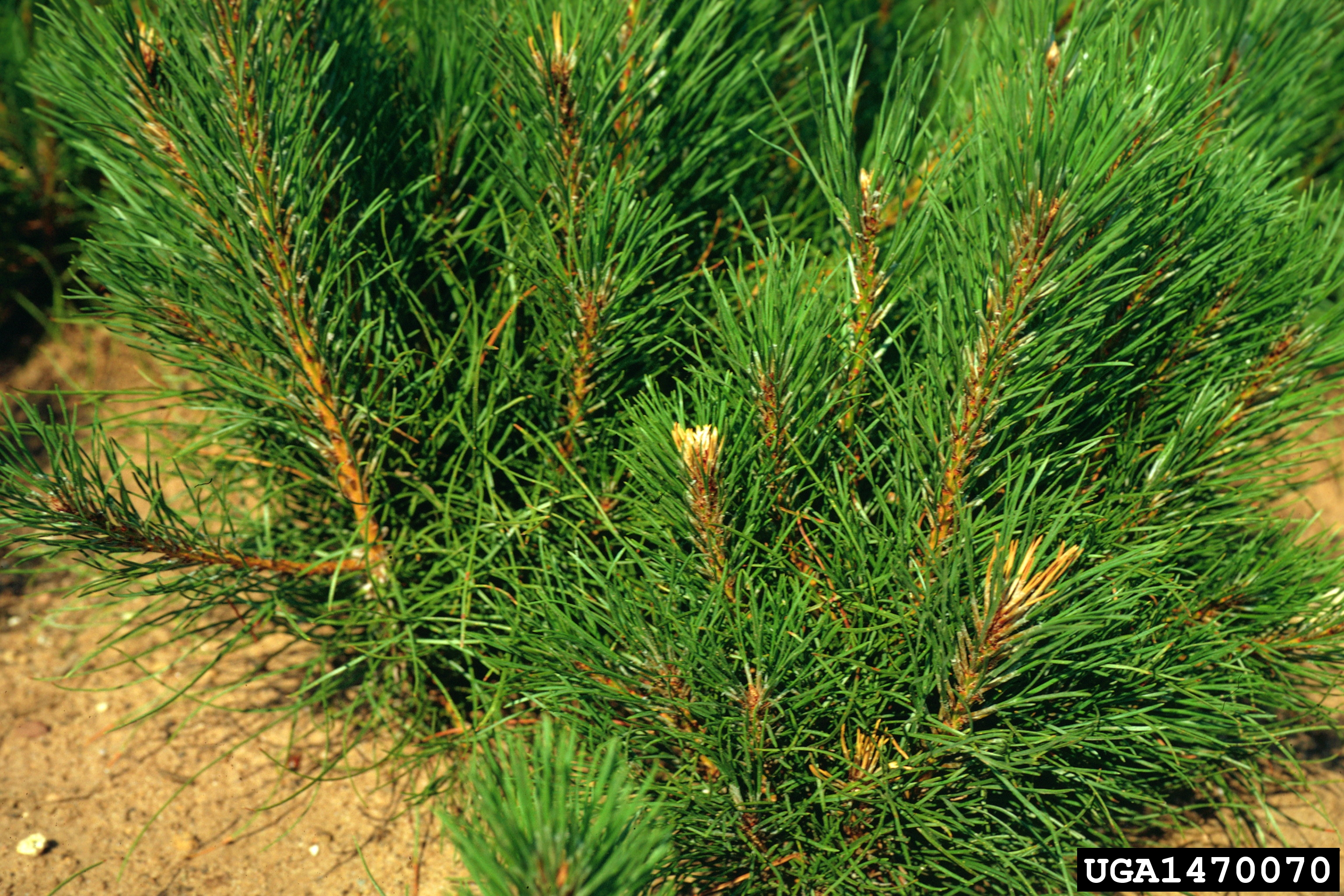
Damage

The wingspan is about 17 mm. There is one generation per year.

The larvae feed on various pine species.
