= Rhyacionia dativa =

Scientific classification
- Domain: Eukaryota
- Kingdom: Animalia
- Phylum: Arthropoda
- Class: Insecta
- Order: Lepidoptera
- Family: Tortricidae
- Genus: Rhyacionia
- Species: R. dativa

Binomial name
- Rhyacionia dativa Heinrich, 1928

Synonyms
- Evertia japoniella Matsumura, 1917

Species of moth

Rhyacionia dativa is a species of moth of the family Tortricidae. It is found in China (Jilin, Jiangsu, Zhejiang, Anhui, Jiangxi, Shandong, Henan, Hubei, Guangdong, Sichuan), Taiwan, Korea, Japan and Russia.

The wingspan is 16–23 mm.

The larvae feed on Pinus massoniana and Pinus thunbergii.
