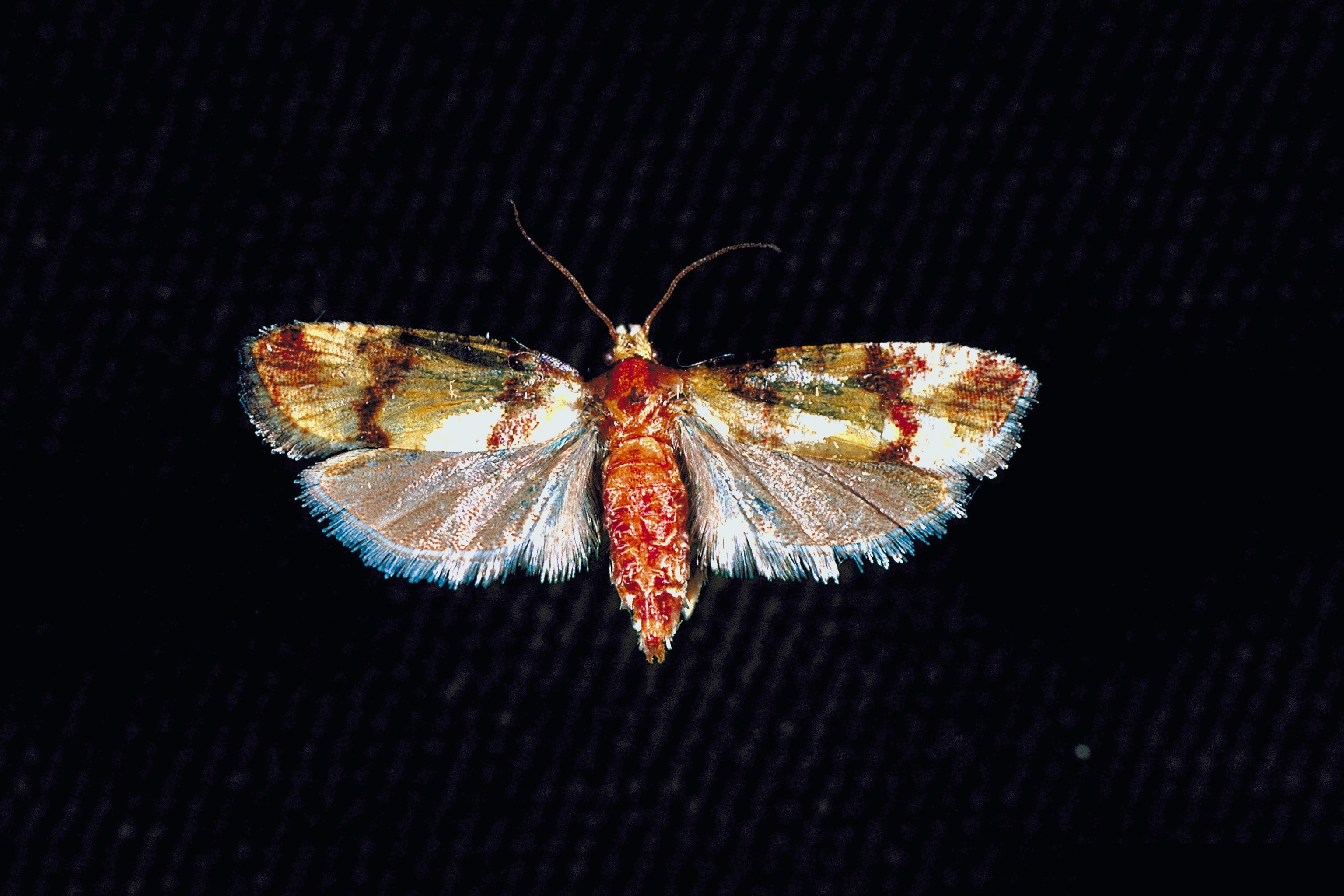

Scientific classification
- Domain: Eukaryota
- Kingdom: Animalia
- Phylum: Arthropoda
- Class: Insecta
- Order: Lepidoptera
- Family: Tortricidae
- Genus: Rhyacionia
- Species: R. subtropica

Binomial name
- Rhyacionia subtropica Miller, 1961

= Rhyacionia subtropica =

Species of moth

Rhyacionia subtropica, the subtropical pine tip moth, is a species of moth of the family Tortricidae. It is found in the United States in southern Alabama and Florida. It has also been recorded from Cuba and Belize.

The wingspan is about 18 mm.

The larvae feed on Pinus elliottii, Pinus palustris, Pinus thunbergiana and Pinus caribaea. They attack the tips of their host plant.
