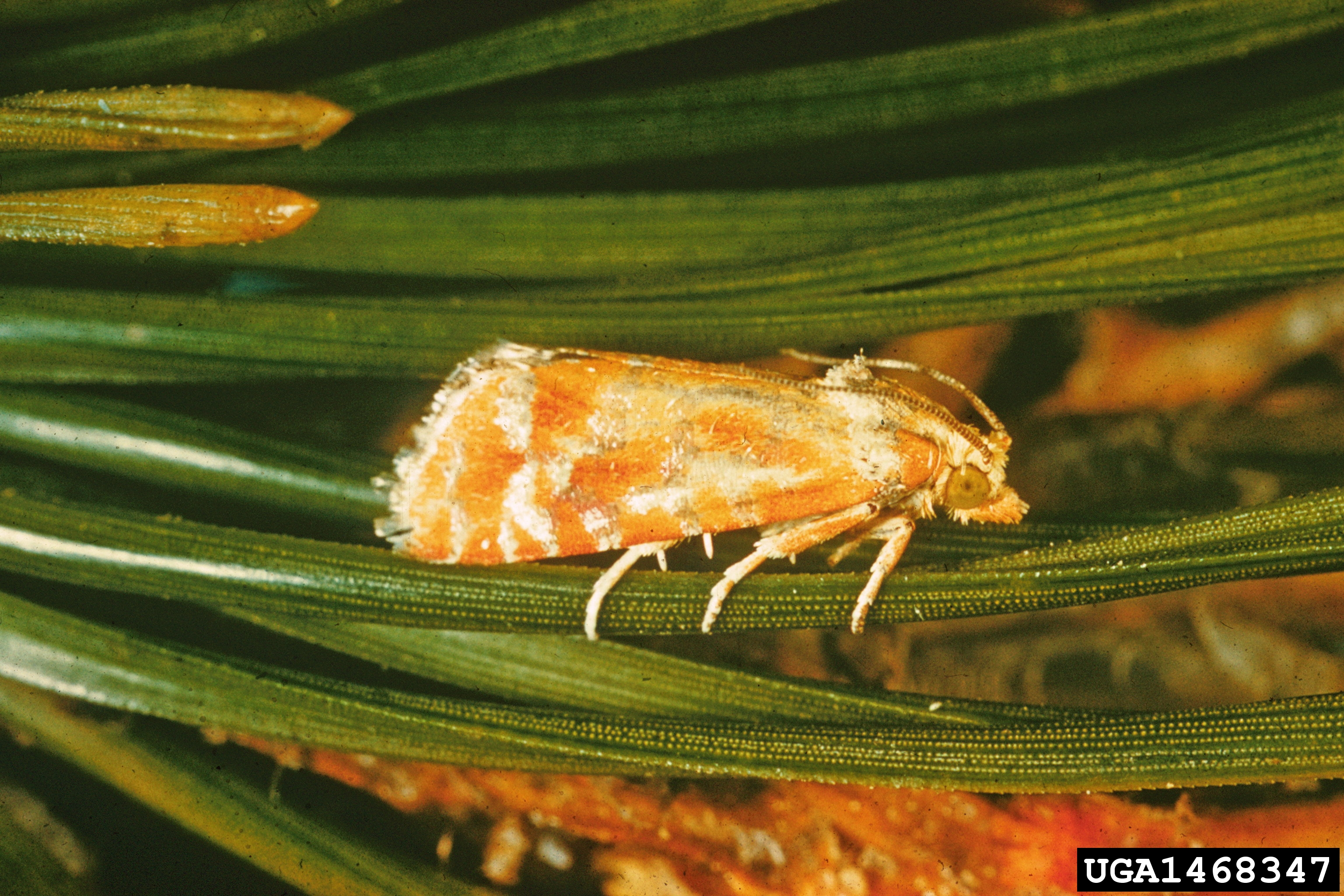
- Rhyacionia buoliana

Scientific classification
- Domain: Eukaryota
- Kingdom: Animalia
- Phylum: Arthropoda
- Class: Insecta
- Order: Lepidoptera
- Family: Tortricidae
- Tribe: Eucosmini
- Genus: Rhyacionia; Hübner, [1825]

= Rhyacionia =

Genus of tortrix moths

Rhyacionia is a genus of moths belonging to the subfamily Olethreutinae of the family Tortricidae.

== Species ==
- Rhyacionia adana Heinrich, 1923 – Adana pine tip moth
- Rhyacionia aktita Miller, in Powell & Miller, 1978
- Rhyacionia aureola Powell, in Powell & Miller, 1978
- Rhyacionia blanchardi Miller, in Powell & Miller, 1978
- Rhyacionia buoliana ([Denis & Schiffermüller], 1775) – European pine shoot moth
- Rhyacionia busckana Heinrich, 1923 – red pine tip moth
- Rhyacionia bushnelli (Busck, 1914)
- Rhyacionia cibriani Miller, 1988
- Rhyacionia dativa Heinrich, 1928
- Rhyacionia dolichotubula Liu & Bai, 1984
- Rhyacionia duplana (Hübner, [1811-1813])
- Rhyacionia flammicolor Powell, in Powell & Miller, 1978
- Rhyacionia frustrana (Scudder, in Comstock, 1880) – Nantucket pine tip moth
- Rhyacionia fumosana Powell, in Powell & Miller, 1978
- Rhyacionia granti Miller, 1985 – jack pine tip moth
- Rhyacionia hafneri (Rebel, 1937)
- Rhyacionia insulariana Liu, in Liu & Bai, 1985
- Rhyacionia jenningsi Powell, in Powell & Miller, 1978
- Rhyacionia leptotubula Liu & Bai, 1984
- Rhyacionia logaea Durrant, 1911
- Rhyacionia malgassana (Saalmuller, 1880)
- Rhyacionia maritimana Prse, 1981
- Rhyacionia martinana Powell, in Powell & Miller, 1978
- Rhyacionia miniatana (Staudinger, 1871)
- Rhyacionia monophylliana (Kearfott, 1907)
- Rhyacionia multilineata Powell, in Powell & Miller, 1978
- Rhyacionia neomexicana (Dyar, 1903)
- Rhyacionia pallidicosta Razowski, 1999
- Rhyacionia pallifasciata Powell, in Powell & Miller, 1978
- Rhyacionia pasadenana (Kearfott, 1907)
- Rhyacionia pinicolana (Doubleday, 1850)
- Rhyacionia pinivorana (Lienig & Zeller, 1846)
- Rhyacionia rigidana (Fernald, in Comstock, 1880) – pitch pine tip moth
- Rhyacionia rubigifasciola Miller, 1988
- Rhyacionia salmonicolor Powell, in Powell & Miller, 1978
- Rhyacionia sonia Miller, 1967 – yellow jack pine tip moth
- Rhyacionia subcervinana (Walsingham, 1879)
- Rhyacionia subtropica Miller, 1961 – subtropical pine tip moth
- Rhyacionia vernalis Nasu & Kawahara, 2004
- Rhyacionia versicolor Powell, in Powell & Miller, 1978
- Rhyacionia walsinghami (Rebel, 1896)
- Rhyacionia washiyai Kono & Sawamoto, 1940
- Rhyacionia zozana (Kearfott, 1907)

== See also ==
- List of Tortricidae genera
