= Rhyacionia washiyai =

Scientific classification
- Domain: Eukaryota
- Kingdom: Animalia
- Phylum: Arthropoda
- Class: Insecta
- Order: Lepidoptera
- Family: Tortricidae
- Genus: Rhyacionia
- Species: R. washiyai

Binomial name
- Rhyacionia washiyai (Kono & Sawamoto, 1940)

Synonyms
- Evertia washiyai Kono & Sawamoto, 1940

Species of moth

Rhyacionia washiyai is a species of moth of the family Tortricidae. It is found in Japan on the island of Hokkaido.

The wingspan is about 21 mm.

The larvae feed on Pinus nigra.
