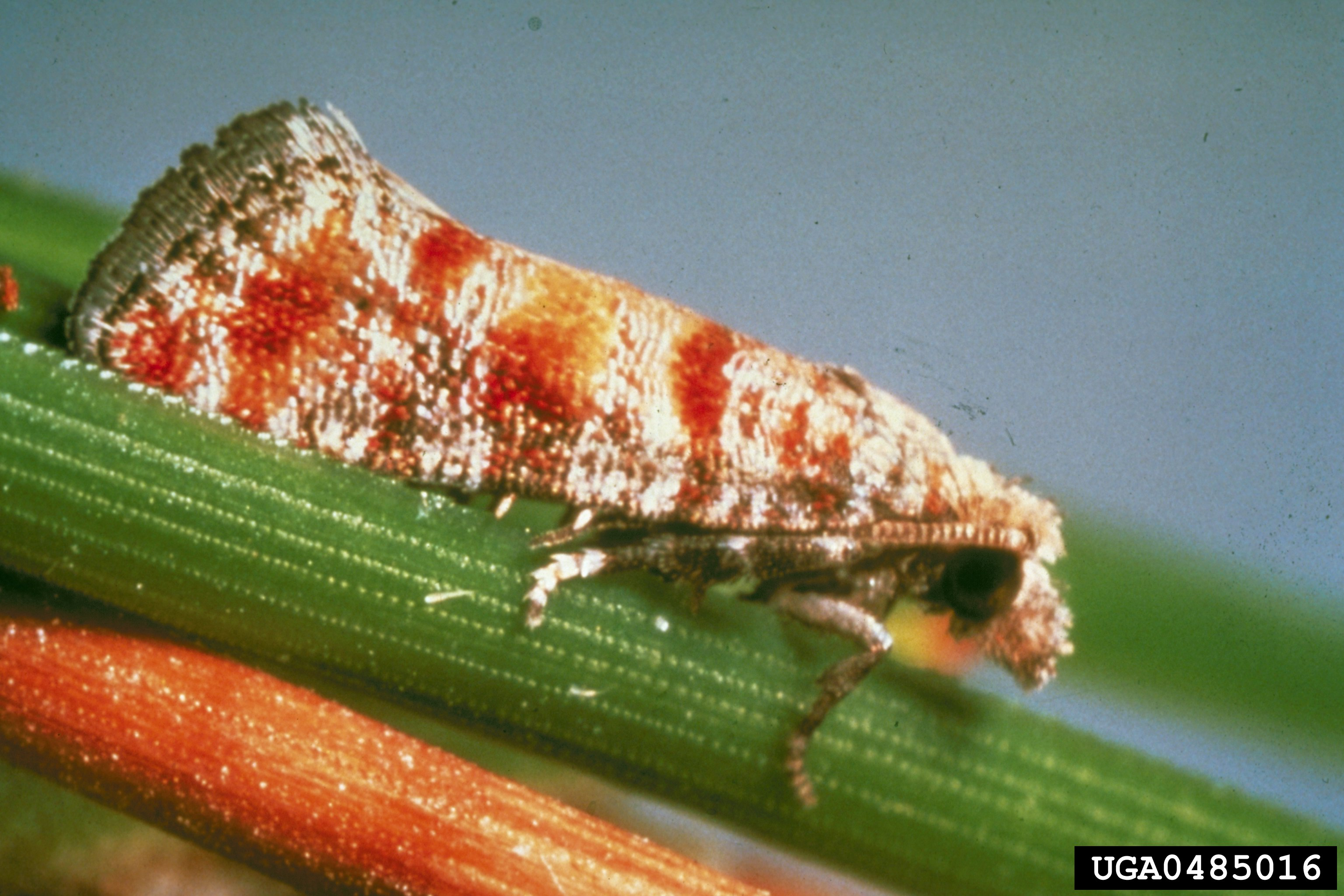

Scientific classification
- Kingdom: Animalia
- Phylum: Arthropoda
- Class: Insecta
- Order: Lepidoptera
- Family: Tortricidae
- Genus: Rhyacionia
- Species: R. frustrana

Binomial name
- Rhyacionia frustrana (Scudder in Comstock, 1880)

Synonyms
- Retinia frustrana Scudder in Comstock, 1880; Rhyacionia pseudostrobana Amsel, 1962

= Rhyacionia frustrana =

Species of moth

Rhyacionia frustrana, the Nantucket pine tip moth, is a moth of the family Tortricidae. It is found in the United States from Massachusetts south to Florida, west to Missouri, Oklahoma, Texas and California. It is also found in the Dominican Republic, Cuba, Jamaica, Mexico (Oaxaca), Guatemala, Honduras and Nicaragua.

The wingspan is about 11 mm. Adults emerge in early spring, at times as early as February in Florida. There are four to five generations per year in Florida.

Larvae feed on various pine species, including Pinus caribaea, Pinus cubensis, Pinus banksiana, Pinus taeda, Pinus contorta, Pinus radiata, Pinus oocarpa, Pinus rigida, Pinus serotina, Pinus ponderosa, Pinus resinosa, Pinus clausa, Pinus sylvestris, Pinus echinata, Pinus elliottii, Pinus glabra, Pinus pungens and Pinus virginiana.

== Gallery ==
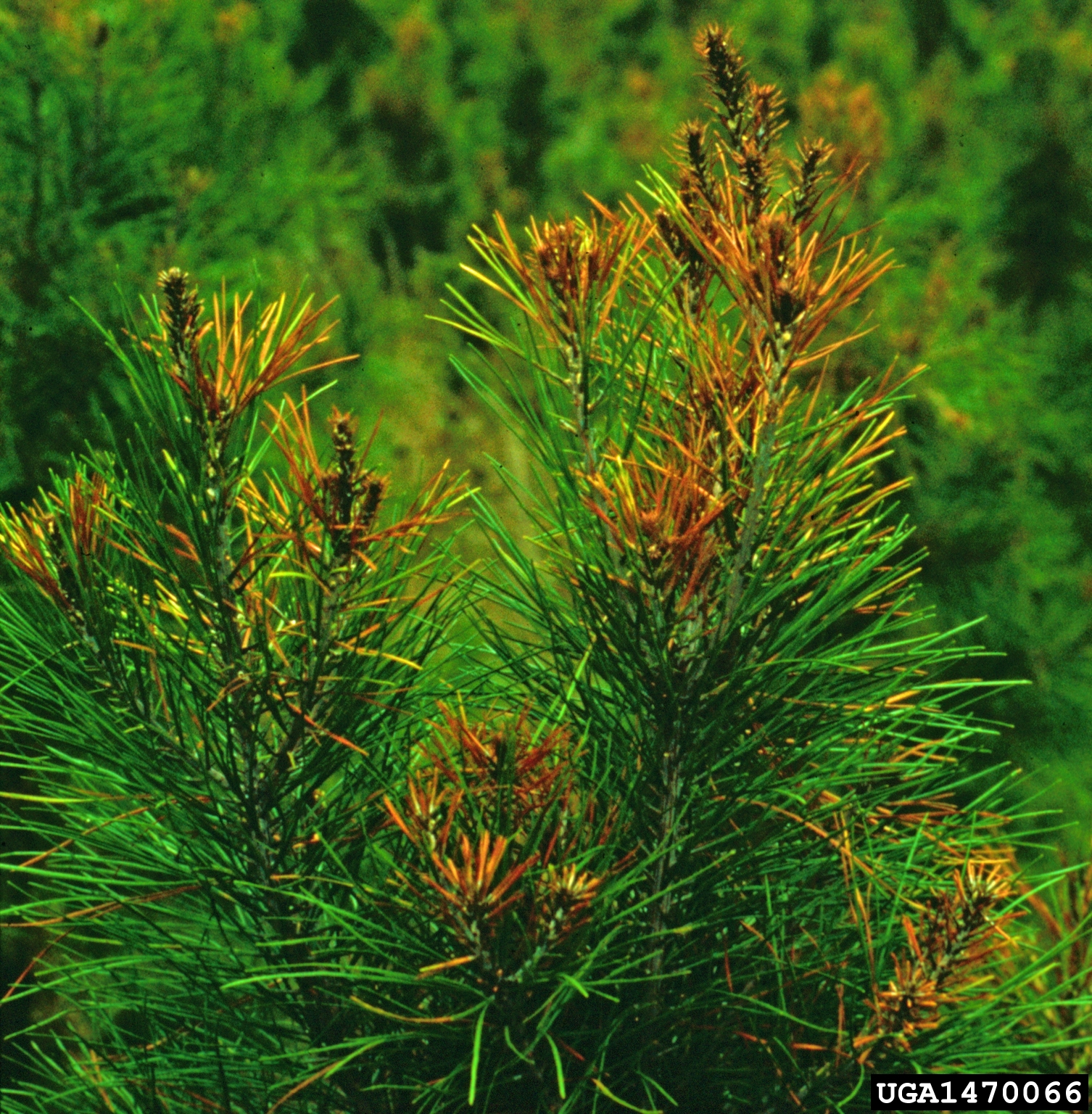
Damage

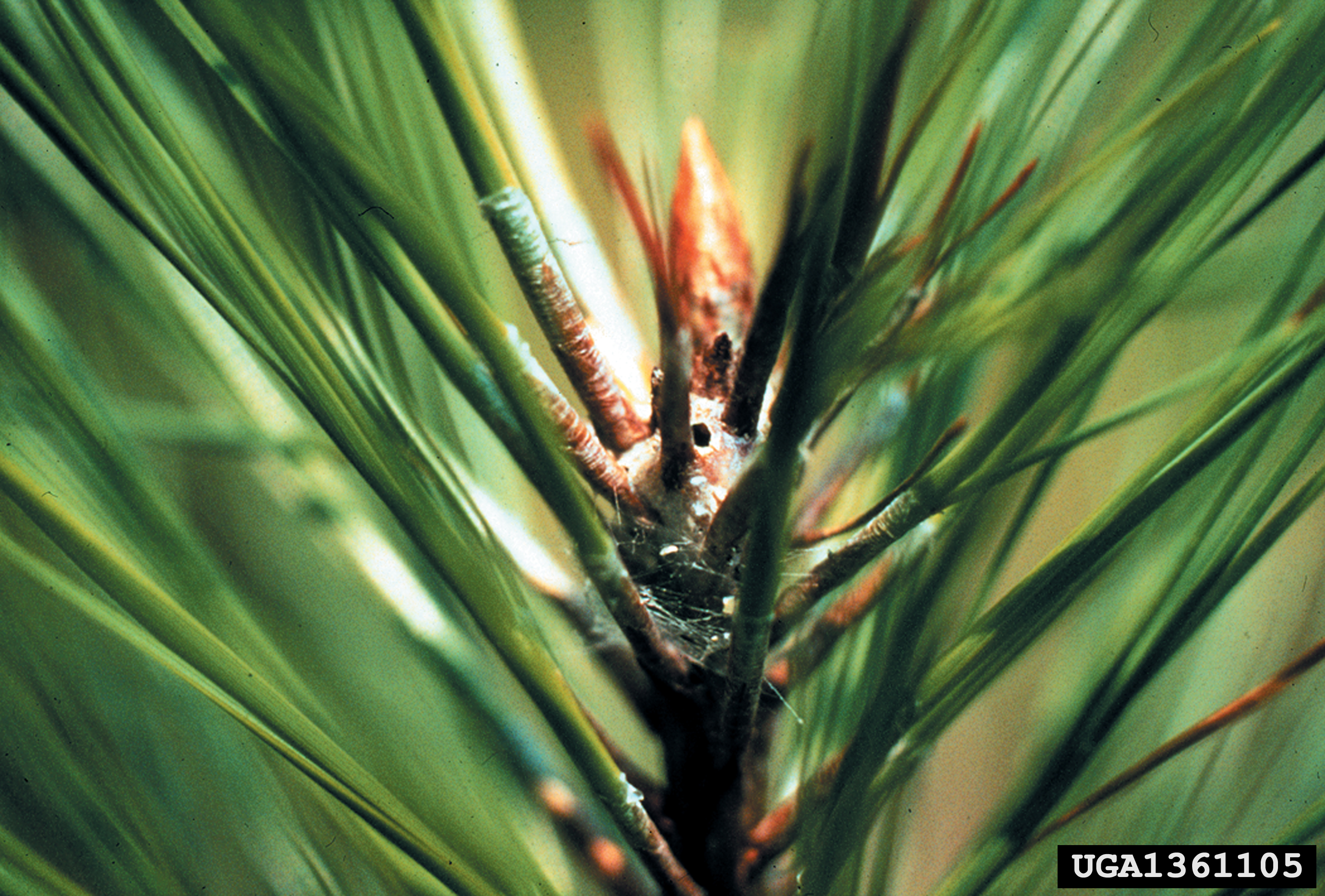
Larval web

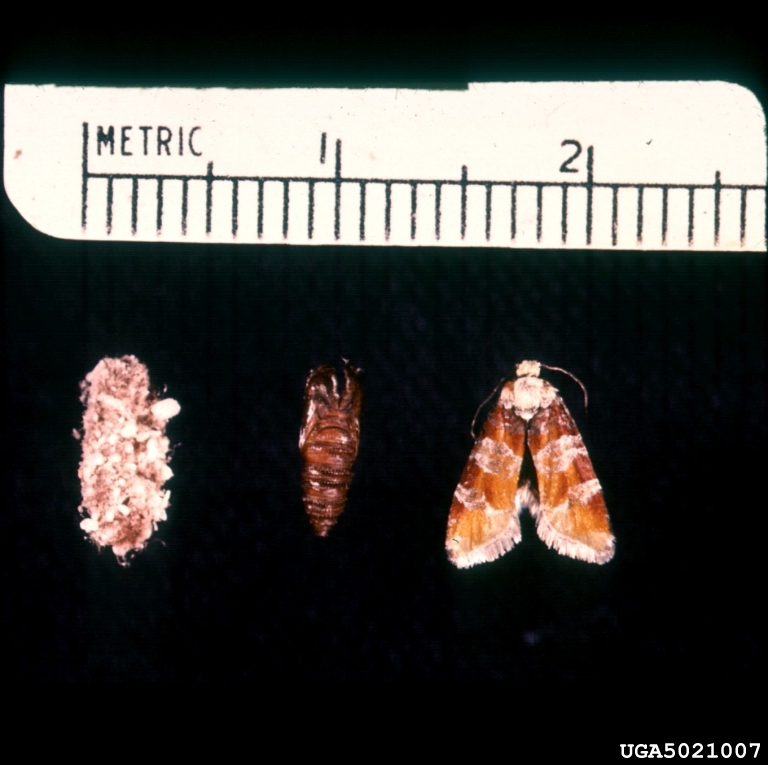
Life cycle

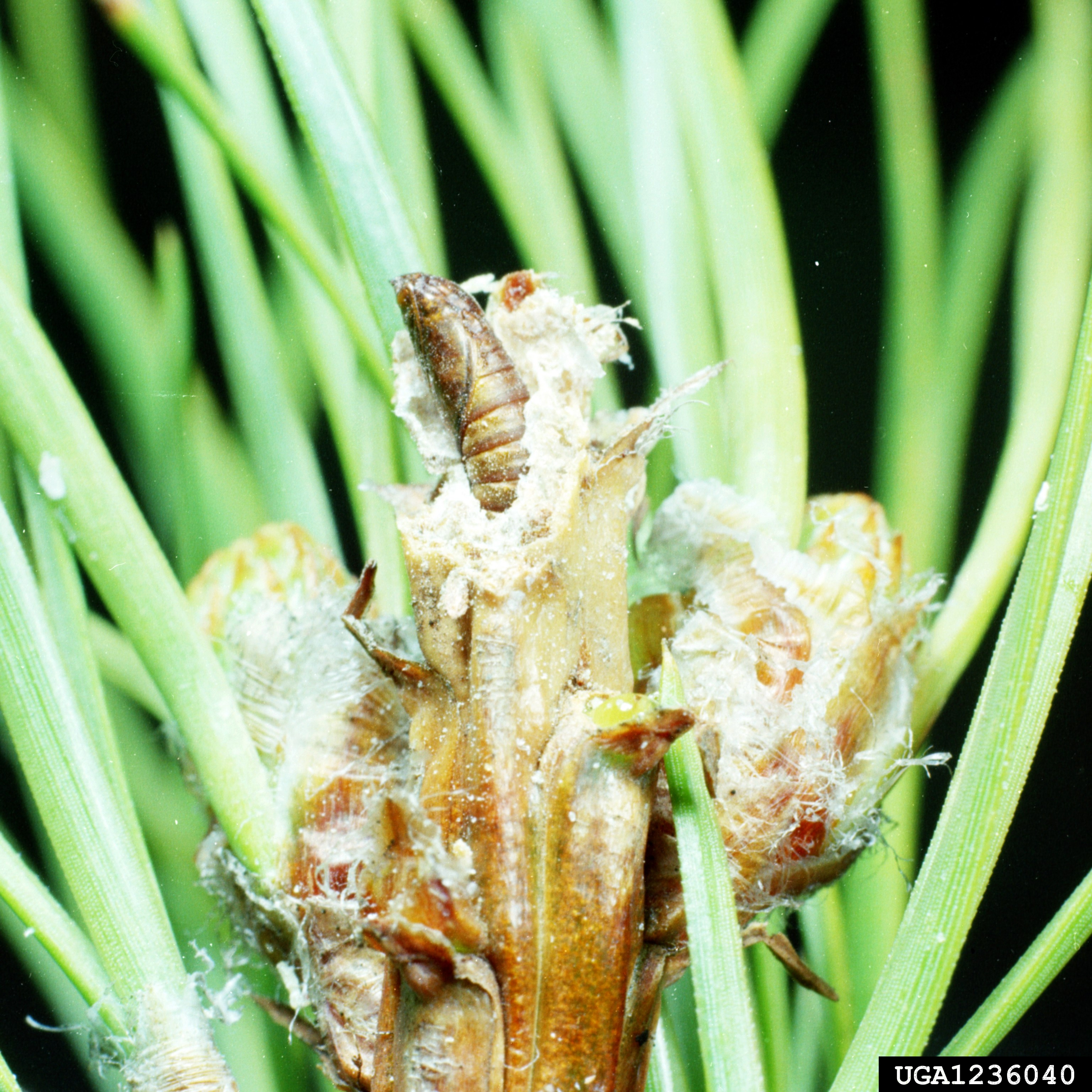
Pupa
