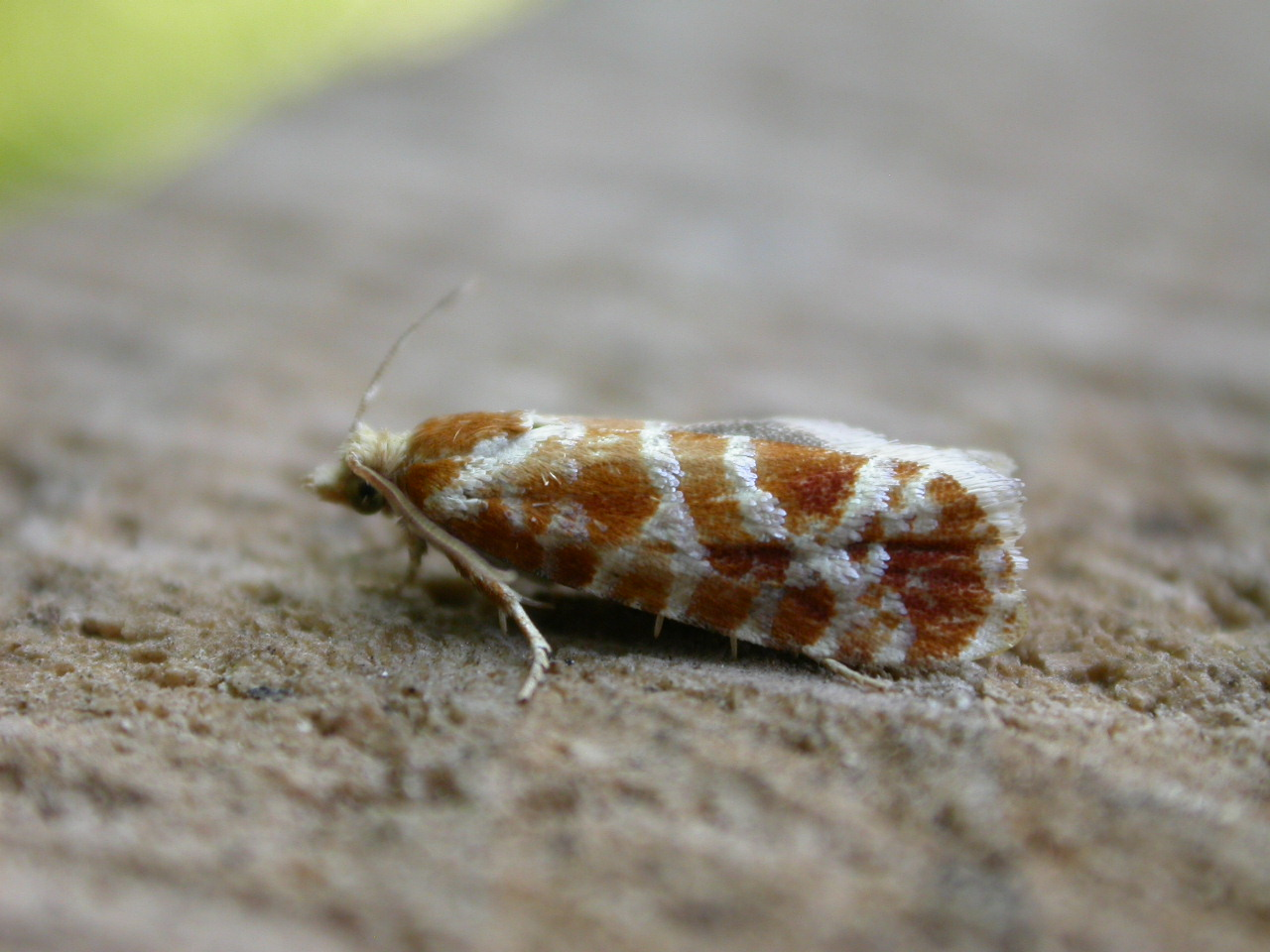

Scientific classification
- Kingdom: Animalia
- Phylum: Arthropoda
- Class: Insecta
- Order: Lepidoptera
- Family: Tortricidae
- Genus: Rhyacionia
- Species: R. pinicolana

Binomial name
- Rhyacionia pinicolana (Doubleday, 1850)

Synonyms
- Spilonota pinicolana Doubleday, 1850; Rhyacinia cocinnana Vives Moreno, 1991; Retinia buoliana var. concinnana Lederer, 1859; Evetria pinicola Bodenheimer, 1927

= Rhyacionia pinicolana =

Species of moth

Rhyacionia pinicolana is a moth of the family Tortricidae. It is found from northern and central Europe to eastern Russia, China (Beijing, Tianjin, Hebei, Shanxi, Inner Mongolia, Liaoning, Jilin, Heilongjiang, Fujian, Jiangxi, Henan, Guizhou, Shaanxi, Ningxia), Japan and Korea.

The wingspan is 16–23 mm. Adults are on wing from mid July to the end of August.

The larvae feed on Pinus sylvestris, Pinus halepensis and Pinus nigra var. nigra.
