= Rhyacionia insulariana =

Scientific classification
- Domain: Eukaryota
- Kingdom: Animalia
- Phylum: Arthropoda
- Class: Insecta
- Order: Lepidoptera
- Family: Tortricidae
- Genus: Rhyacionia
- Species: R. insulariana

Binomial name
- Rhyacionia insulariana Liu, 1981

Species of moth

Rhyacionia insulariana is a species of moth of the family Tortricidae. It is found in China (Sichuan, Yunnan).

The larvae feed on Pinus yunnanensis, Pinus densata, Pinus kesiya var. langbianensis, Pinus armandi and Pinus massoniana.
