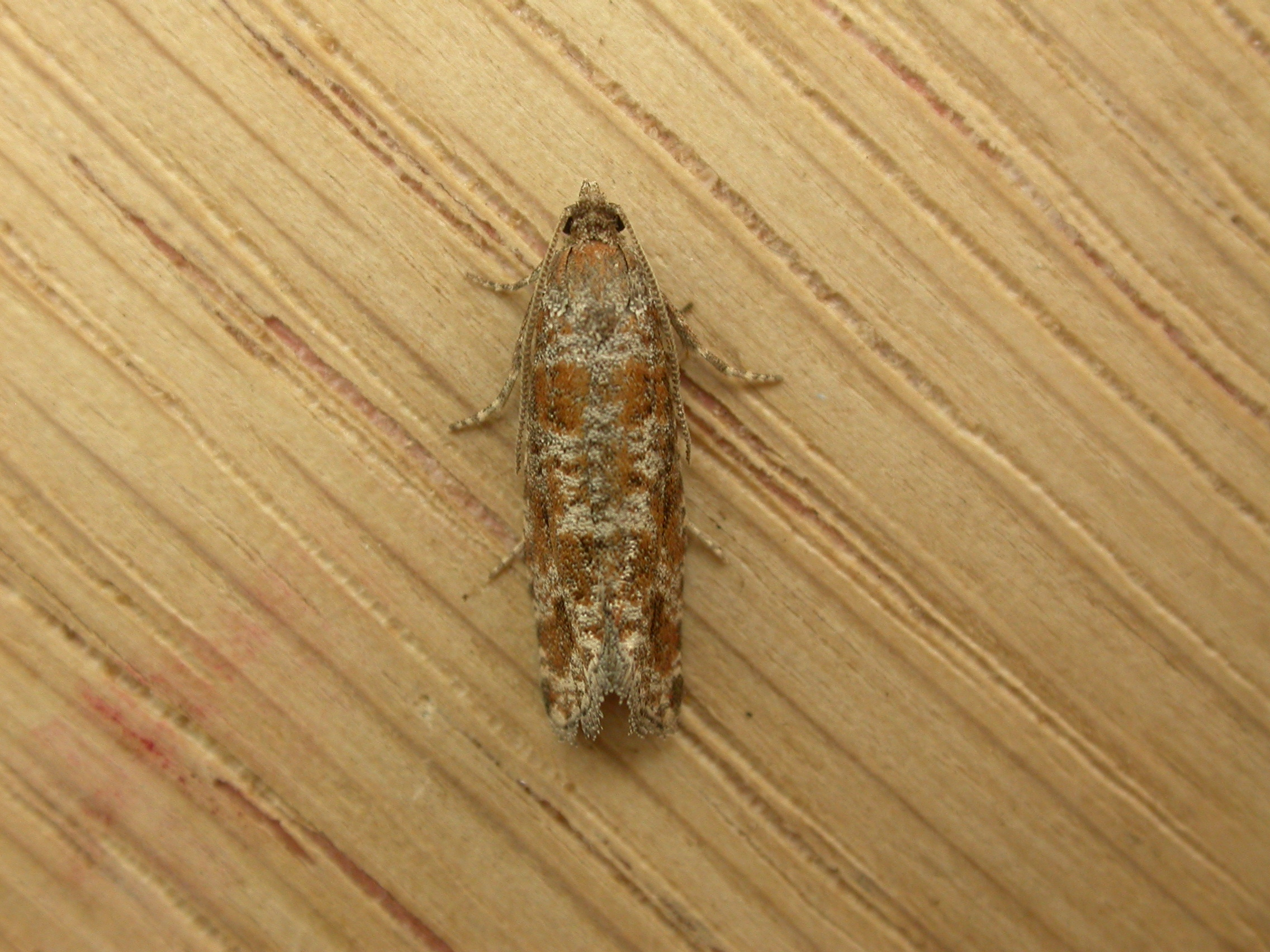

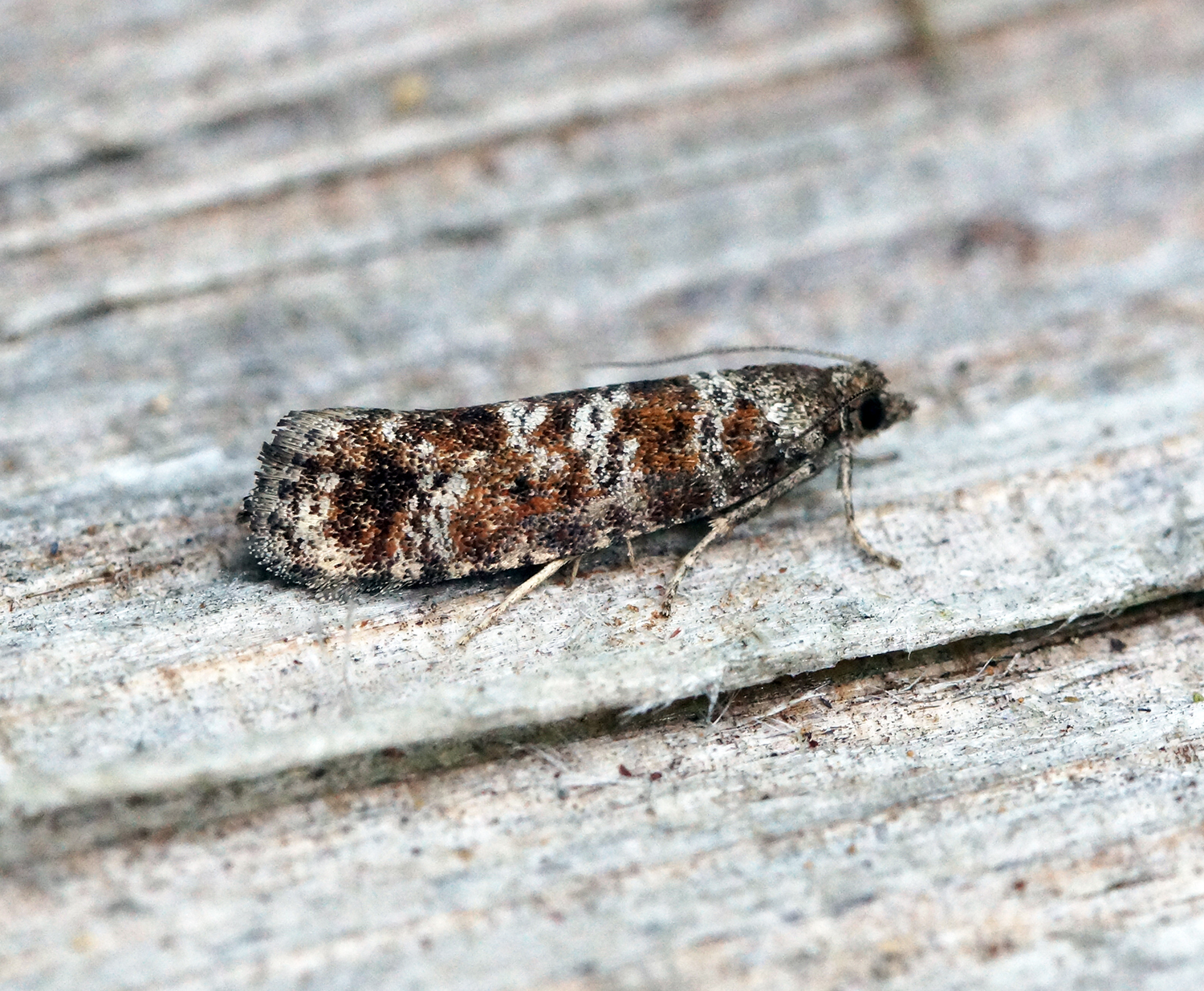

Scientific classification
- Kingdom: Animalia
- Phylum: Arthropoda
- Clade: Pancrustacea
- Class: Insecta
- Order: Lepidoptera
- Family: Tortricidae
- Genus: Rhyacionia
- Species: R. pinivorana

Binomial name
- Rhyacionia pinivorana (Zeller, 1846)

Synonyms
- Coccyx pinivorana Lienig & Zeller, 1846; Retinia albionana Doubleday, 1850; Tortrix pudendana Herrich-Schäffer, 1848; Tortrix pudendana Herrich-Schäffer, 1851; Evetria pinivorana var. rhaeticana Thomann, in Thomann, Standfuss & Muller-Rutz, 1914; Coccyx sciurana Tengstrom, 1848

= Rhyacionia pinivorana =

Species of moth

Rhyacionia pinivorana, the spotted shoot moth, is a moth of the family Tortricidae. It is found from northern and central Europe to eastern Russia, China, Korea and Japan.

The wingspan is 15–19 mm. The forewings are brownish-ferruginous, sometimes sprinkled with dark fuscous, costa and dorsum dark fuscous; numerous irregular variable anastomosing shining grey-whitish striae. Hindwings grey. It is similar to Rhyacionia buoliana but darker and less reddish.

Adults are on wing in May and early June.

The larvae feed on Pinus sylvestris. The larvae attack the leading shoot.
