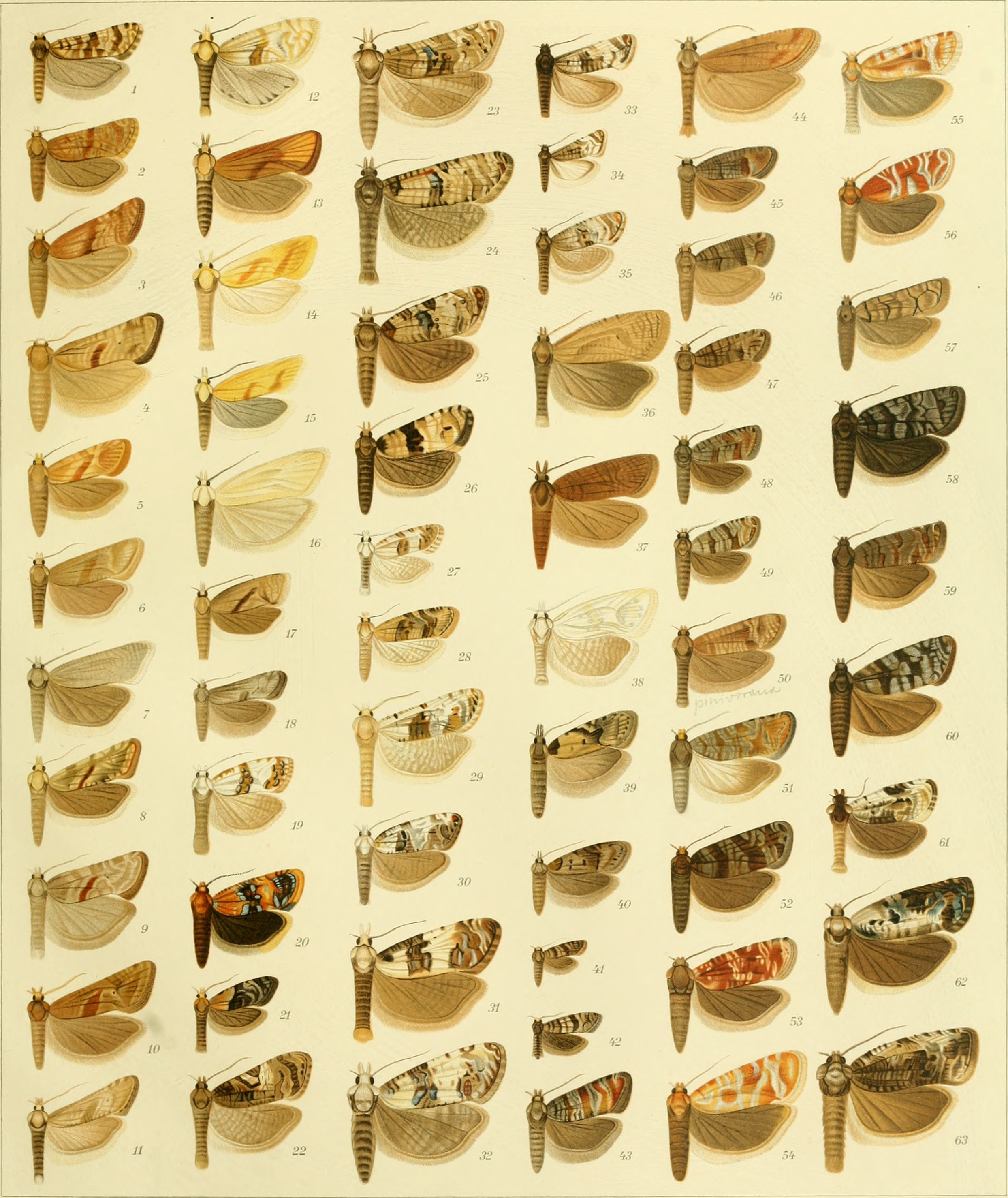
- Rhyacionia duplana in Kennel Die palaearktischen tortriciden figure 43 female

Scientific classification
- Kingdom: Animalia
- Phylum: Arthropoda
- Class: Insecta
- Order: Lepidoptera
- Family: Tortricidae
- Genus: Rhyacionia
- Species: R. duplana

Binomial name
- Rhyacionia duplana (Hubner, [1811-1813])

Synonyms
- Tortrix duplana Hubner, [1811-1813]; Tortrix coruscana Frolich, 1828; Rhyacionia simulata Heinrich, 1928; Rhyacionia simutata Issiki, in Esaki et al., 1957; Coccyx spadiceana Duponchel, in Godart, 1835; Coccyx spadiceana Duponchel, in Godart, 1836

= Rhyacionia duplana =

Species of moth

Rhyacionia duplana, the summer shoot moth or Elgin shoot moth when referring to subspecies logaea, is a moth of the family Tortricidae. It is found from northern and central Europe to eastern Russia, China (Beijing, Hebei, Shanxi, Liaoning, Jiangsu, Shandong, Henan, Shaanxi) and Japan. It has also been reported from Korea, but it has not been found in recent studies.

The wingspan is 14–18 mm. The flight period of the adults usually starts in April, in warmer areas often in March.

The larvae feed on Pinus sylvestris, Pinus contorta var. latifolia, Pinus thunbergii and Picea sitchensis. Damage occurs especially in 5 to 12-year-old pine trees.

== Subspecies ==
- Rhyacionia duplana duplana
- Rhyacionia duplana simulata Heinrich, 1928 (Japan)
