= Phalonidia aetheria =

Scientific classification
- Kingdom: Animalia
- Phylum: Arthropoda
- Class: Insecta
- Order: Lepidoptera
- Family: Tortricidae
- Genus: Phalonidia
- Species: P. aetheria

Binomial name
- Phalonidia aetheria (Razowski, 1967)

Species of moth

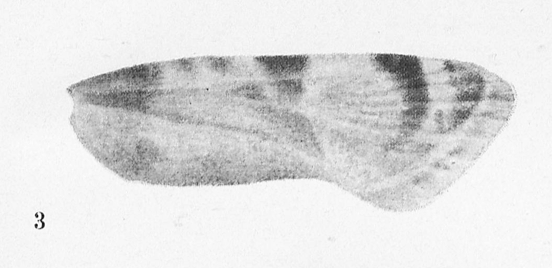
Wing of P. aetheria.

Phalonidia aetheria is a species of moth of the family Tortricidae, the subfamily Tortricinae, and the tribe Cochylini. It is found in Brazil, in the states of São Paulo, Santa Catarina and Goias.

== Description ==
From Razowski, 1967, sp.n.:

Labial palpus about 1.5, slender, pale brownish ochreous. Head and thorax rather concolorous with palpi, front paler, creamer. Forewing not dilated posteriorly: costa hardly curved anteriorly, then almost straight, apex short, pointed; termen oblique, straight. Ground colour pale yellowish ochreous, glossy, suffused with ochreous especially along costa and medially. Median fascia represented by brownish ochreous spot in middle of costa, atrophied subcostally, scaled with brown at edges, followed towards dorsum by dark ochreous irregularly intense suffusion. Two or three small dots concolorous with mentioned spot at costa anteriorly and another one 3/4 of costa protruding and forming broad ochreous brown blotch directed towards middle of termen and atrophied before it. Small spot of same color at apex and in mid-way to the formen element as well as at tornus. Fringes darker than ground colour. Hindwing cream, rather narrow, with apex protruding, pointed; fringes pale cream. Length of forewing 3 mm. Male genitalia: Tegumen delicate; socii proportionately very large, coalescent, tapering terminally, with very short free ends. Valva broad, tapering terminad beyond middle, with costa well developed; sacculus strong, irregularly shaped ventrally, convex before middle, curved outwards dorsally, marked with group of rather long spines posteriorly that covers short free termination. Transtilla with proportionately broad lateral parts and elongate, broad anteriorly median portion. Aedeagus slender, bent in middle, protruding and pointed terminally; short, rather broad cornutus and some minute spines in vesica present.

For a key to the terms used, see Glossary of entomology terms.

== Similar species ==
- Archipimima vermelhana (Razowski, 2004)
- Aethesoides stellans (Razowski & Becker, 1994)
- Brazeulia joaquimana (Razowski & Becker, 2000)
- Clepsis catarinana (Razowski & Becker, 2003)
- Clepsis griseotona (Razowski & Becker, 2010)
- Clepsis joaquimana (Razowski & Becker, 1999)
- Cuproxena eudiometra (Razowski & Becker, 1990)
- Gravitcornutia cinnamomea (Razowski & Becker, 2001)
- Gravitcornutia curiosa (Razowski & Becker, 2001)
- Gravitcornutia recta (Razowski & Becker, 2010)
- Gravitcornutia umbrosa (Razowski & Becker, 2001)
- Lasiothyris luminosa (Razowski & Becker, 1983)
- Marylinka secunda (Razowski & Becker, 2007)
- Netechma luteopoecila (Razowski & Becker, 2001)
- Netechma ochrata (Razowski & Becker, 2001)
- Orthocomotis attonsa (Razowski, 1982)
- Phalonidia assensus (Razowski, 1967)
- Phalonidia dyas (Razowski & Becker, 1983)
- Phalonidia fatua (Razowski & Becker, 1983)
- Phalonidia horrens (Razowski & Becker, 1983)
- Phalonidia monocera (Razowski & Becker, 2007)
- Phalonidia squalida (Razowski & Becker, 1983)
- Phalonidia unguifera (Razowski, 1976)
- Razowskiina glochina (Razowski & Becker, 1991)
- Razowskiina psydra (Razowski & Becker, 1991)
- Sychnovalva simillima (Razowski & Becker, 2010)
- Terinebrica fortifera (Razowski, 1991)
- Terinebrica portentifica (Razowski & Becker, 2001)
- Terinebrica spiniloba (Razowski & Becker, 2001)
- Uelia sepidapex (Razowski, 1982)
