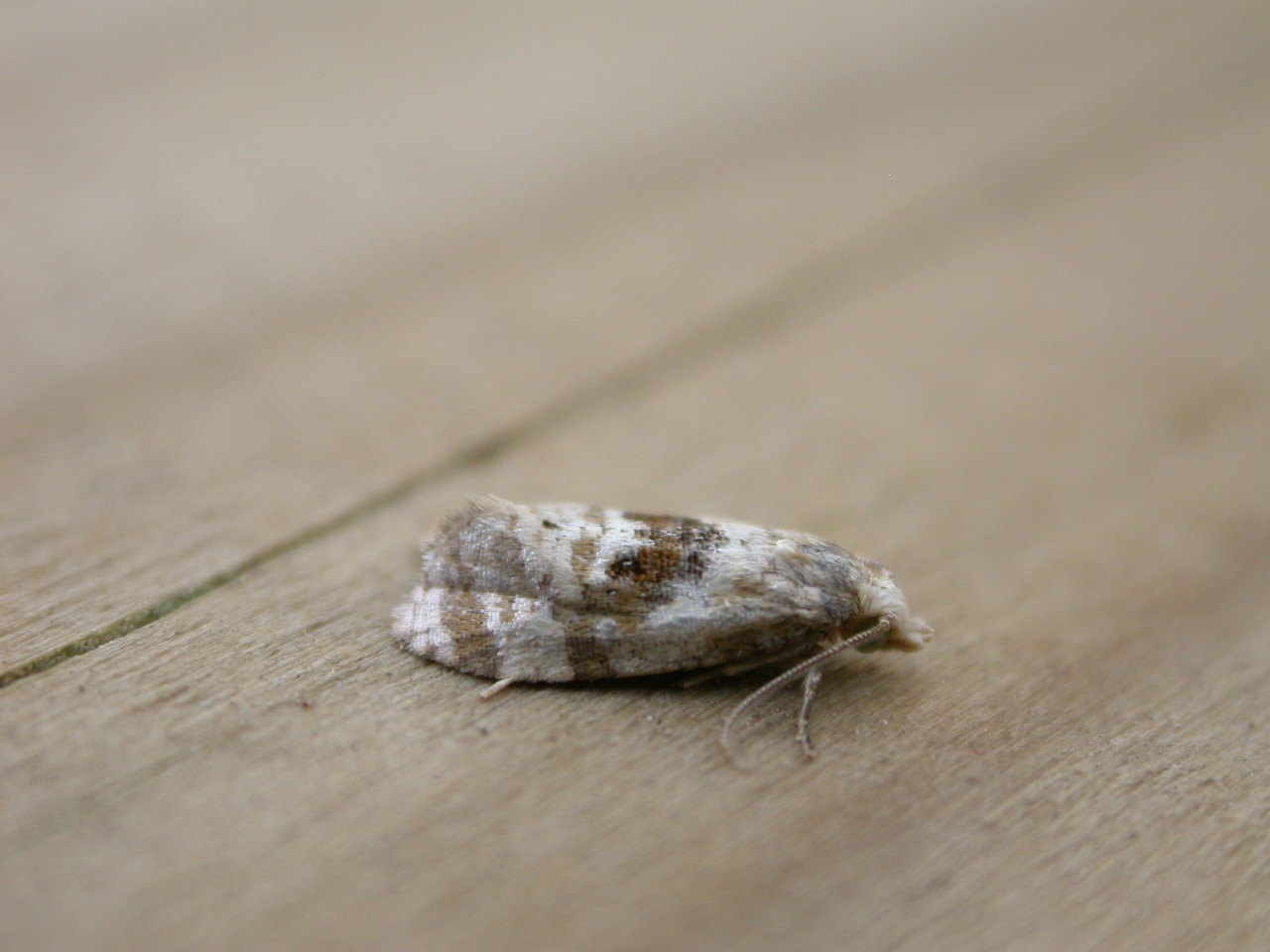
- Phalonidia manniana

Scientific classification
- Kingdom: Animalia
- Phylum: Arthropoda
- Clade: Pancrustacea
- Class: Insecta
- Order: Lepidoptera
- Family: Tortricidae
- Tribe: Cochylini
- Genus: Phalonidia; Le Marchand, 1933

Synonyms
- Brevisociaria Obraztsov, 1943; Platphalonidia Razowski, 1985

= Phalonidia =

Genus of tortrix moths

Phalonidia is a genus of moths belonging to the subfamily Tortricinae of the family Tortricidae.

== Distribution ==
Phalonidia is found almost world-wide, except for the African and Australian regions. The genus is most diverse in the Neotropical and Palaearctic regions.

== Species ==
- Phalonidia acrota (Razowski, 1993)
- Phalonidia aetheria (Razowski, 1967)
- Phalonidia affinitana (Douglas, 1846)
- Phalonidia alassosaccula (Razowski, 1997)
- Phalonidia albertae (Razowski, 1997)
- Phalonidia albicaput (Razowski & Becker, 2002)
- Phalonidia albipalpana (Zeller, 1847)
- Phalonidia aliena (Kuznetzov, 1966)
- Phalonidia amasiana (Ragonot, 1894)
- Phalonidia argyraspis (Razowski, 1984)
- Phalonidia assensus (Razowski, 1967)
- Phalonidia baccatana (Razowski & Wojtusiak, 2010)
- Phalonidia basiochreana (Kearfott, 1907)
- Phalonidia bassii (Razowski, 1999)
- Phalonidia brevifasciaria (Y.H. Sun & H.H. Li, 2013)
- Phalonidia brilhanteana (Razowski & Becker, 1983)
- Phalonidia campicolana (Walsingham, 1879)
- Phalonidia cerina (Razowski & Becker, 2007)
- Phalonidia cermatia (Razowski & Becker, 2002)
- Phalonidia charagmophora (Razowski, 1999)
- Phalonidia chlaenites (Razowski & Becker, 2002)
- Phalonidia chloridia (Razowski & Becker, 1994)
- Phalonidia chlorolitha (Meyrick, 1931)
- Phalonidia cholovalva (Razowski & Wojtusiak, 2006)
- Phalonidia claudia (Razowski & Wojtusiak, 2006)
- Phalonidia contractana (Zeller, 1847)
- Phalonidia coreana (Byun & Li, 2006)
- Phalonidia curvistrigana (Stainton, 1859)
- Phalonidia dangi (Razowski, 1997)
- Phalonidia decrepita (Razowski & Becker, 2002)
- Phalonidia diamphidia (Clarke, 1968)
- Phalonidia diaphona (Razowski & Becker, 1986)
- Phalonidia docilis (Razowski & Becker, 2002)
- Phalonidia dotica (Razowski, 1993)
- Phalonidia droserantha (Razowski, 1970)
- Phalonidia dyas (Razowski & Becker, 1983)
- Phalonidia dysmorphia (Clarke, 1968)
- Phalonidia dysodona (Caradja, 1916)
- Phalonidia ecuadorensis (Razowski, 1967)
- Phalonidia elderana (Kearfott, 1907)
- Phalonidia electra (Razowski & Becker, 2002)
- Phalonidia embaphion (Razowski, 1984)
- Phalonidia fariasana (Razowski & Becker, 2007)
- Phalonidia fatua (Razowski & Becker, 1983)
- Phalonidia fraterna (Razowski, 1970)
- Phalonidia fulvimixta (Filipjev, 1940)
- Phalonidia gilvicomana (Zeller, 1847)
- Phalonidia haesitans (Razowski & Becker, 1994)
- Phalonidia hapalobursa (Razowski & Becker, 1986)
- Phalonidia haplidia (Razowski, 1986)
- Phalonidia holguina (Razowski & Becker, 2007)
- Phalonidia horrens (Razowski & Becker, 1983)
- Phalonidia hypagosocia (Razowski, 1993)
- Phalonidia imitabilis (Razowski, 1997)
- Phalonidia introrsa (Razowski, 1993)
- Phalonidia jequieta (Razowski & Becker, 2002)
- Phalonidia karsholti (Razowski, 1993)
- Phalonidia kathetospina (Razowski, 1993)
- Phalonidia lacistovalva (Razowski & Becker, 2002)
- Phalonidia laetitia (Clarke, 1968)
- Phalonidia latifasciana (Razowski, 1970)
- Phalonidia latipunctana (Walsingham, 1879)
- Phalonidia lepidana (Clemens, 1860)
- Phalonidia linharesa (Razowski & Becker, 2007)
- Phalonidia lochites (Razowski, 1993)
- Phalonidia loipa (Razowski, 1994)
- Phalonidia lojana (Razowski & Becker, 2002)
- Phalonidia lydiae (Filipjev, 1940)
- Phalonidia manniana (Fischer von Röslerstamm, 1839)
- Phalonidia mayarina (Razowski & Becker, 2007)
- Phalonidia meizobursa (Razowski & Becker, 1994)
- Phalonidia melanothicta (Meyrick, 1927)
- Phalonidia melletes (Razowski & Becker, 1994)
- Phalonidia memoranda (Razowski, 1997)
- Phalonidia mesomerista (Razowski, 1994)
- Phalonidia mimohospes (Razowski & Becker, 1983)
- Phalonidia monocera (Razowski & Becker, 2007)
- Phalonidia nicotiana (Liu & Ge, 1991)
- Phalonidia nonaxyra (Razowski, 1994)
- Phalonidia ochracea (Razowski, 1967)
- Phalonidia ochrimixtana (Zeller, 1877)
- Phalonidia ochrochraon (Razowski & Becker, 2002)
- Phalonidia olivana (Razowski, 1967)
- Phalonidia olivogrisea (Razowski & Wojtusiak, 2010)
- Phalonidia ontariana (Razowski, 1997)
- Phalonidia paliki (Razowski & Becker, 1983)
- Phalonidia parapellax (Razowski, 1999)
- Phalonidia parvana (Kawabe, 1980)
- Phalonidia pellax (Razowski & Becker, 1983)
- Phalonidia phlebotoma (Razowski & Becker, 1994)
- Phalonidia praemorsa (Razowski, 1993)
- Phalonidia pruinosana (Zeller)
- Phalonidia remissa (Razowski & Becker, 2007)
- Phalonidia remota (Razowski & Becker, 1983)
- Phalonidia rotundiventralis (Y.H. Sun & H.H. Li, 2013)
- Phalonidia rufoatra (Razowski, 1992)
- Phalonidia sarovalva (Razowski, 1993)
- Phalonidia scabra (Liu & Ge, 1991)
- Phalonidia scolopis (Razowski, 1993)
- Phalonidia silvestris (Kuznetzov, 1966)
- Phalonidia squalida (Razowski & Becker, 1983)
- Phalonidia submissana (Zeller, 1877)
- Phalonidia swammerdamiana (Zeller, 1877)
- Phalonidia synucha (Razowski & Becker, 1986)
- Phalonidia tarijana (Razowski & Wojtusiak, 2013)
- Phalonidia tenuispiniformis (Ying-Hui Sun & H.H. Li, 2013)
- Phalonidia thryptica (Razowski, 1994)
- Phalonidia trabalea (Razowski & Becker, 1994)
- Phalonidia udana (Guenée, 1845)
- Phalonidia unguifera (Razowski, 1976)
- Phalonidia vorticata (Meyrick, 1912)
- Phalonidia walkerana (Razowski, 1967)
- Phalonidia zygota (Razowski, 1964)
- Platphalonidia assector (Razowski, 1967)
- Platphalonidia californica (Razowski, 1986)
- Platphalonidia dubia (Razowski & Becker, 1983)
- Platphalonidia felix (Walsingham, 1895)
- Platphalonidia fusifera (Meyrick, 1912)
- Platphalonidia galbanea (Meyrick, 1917)
- Platphalonidia lavana (Busck, 1907)
- Platphalonidia luxata (Razowski & Becker, 1986)
- Platphalonidia mendora (Clarke, 1968)
- Platphalonidia mystica (Razowski & Becker, 1983)
- Platphalonidia ochraceana (Razowski, 1967)
- Platphalonidia paranae (Razowski & Becker, 1983)
- Platphalonidia plicana (Walsingham, 1884)
- Platphalonidia sublimis (Meyrick, 1917)
- Platphalonidia subolivacea (Walsingham, 1897)
- Platphalonidia tehuacana (Razowski, 1986)

== Former species ==
- Aethes mordax; formerly Phalonia mordax (Meyrick, 1917)
- Aethesoides enclitica; formerly Phalonia enclitica (Meyrick, 1917)
- Fulvoclysia dictyodana; formerly Phalonia acutana (Kennel, 1913)
- Gynnidomorpha julianiensis; formerly Phalonidia julianiensis (Liu & Ge, 1991)
- Gynnidomorpha mesotypa; formerly Phalonidia mesotypa (Razowski, 1970)
- Gynnidomorpha stirodelphys; formerly Phalonidia stirodelphys (Diakonoff, 1976)
- Lorita scarificata; formerly Phalonia scarificata (Meyrick, 1917)
- Mourecochylis mimosina; formerly Platphalonidia mimosina (Razowski, 1986)
- Mourecochylis stibeutes; formerly Platphalonidia stibeutes (Razowski, 1992)
- Saphenista aculeata; formerly Phalonidia aculeata (Razowski, 1967)
- Saphenista aeraria; formerly Phalonidia aeraria (Razowski, 1967)
- Saphenista deliphrobursa; formerly Phalonidia deliphrobursa (Razowski, 1992)
- Saphenista sphragidias; formerly Phalonia sphragidias (Meyrick, 1932)

== See also ==
- List of Tortricidae genera
