= Phalonidia acrota =

Scientific classification
- Kingdom: Animalia
- Phylum: Arthropoda
- Clade: Pancrustacea
- Class: Insecta
- Order: Lepidoptera
- Family: Tortricidae
- Genus: Phalonidia
- Species: P. acrota

Binomial name
- Phalonidia acrota (Razowski, 1993)

Species of moth

Phalonidia acrota is a species of moth of the family Tortricidae, the subfamily Tortricinae, and the tribe Cochylini. It is found in Peru.

== Description ==
Razowski lists the wingspan as 15mm.

=== Original description ===
From Razowski, 1993, sp.n.:

Alar expense 15 mm; head and thorax brownish grey; labial palpus over 1. Forewing distinctly expanding terminally, broad in distal part, with costa slightly concave medially; termen oblique, somewhat convex. Ground-color clear white, in form of broad blotch extending from mid-costa to before apex, reaching beyond middle breadth of wing, with arched distal edge. Dorsal half of wing suffused grey; apical area dark grey with blackish reticulation and some whitish spots; base of wing brownish-grey with some black dashes; median fascia ill-defined, diffuse, blackish, darkest in costal half. Fringes whitish, with median line grey and divisions situated beyond black terminal dots blackish. Hindwing white-cream, suffused and stigulated brownish grey on periphery; fringes long, cream; greyish median line only at apex.

Male genitalia: Socii fairly long, on rather short base; valva up-curved; sacculus with long, rounded free termination; median part of transtilla fairly long, with distinct apical bifurcation. Aedeagus slender, bent, with moderate terminal prominence; caulis very large, with protruding, spined lateral projections; cornutus as long as median part of transtilla.

Abdominal scent organ small, in form of short process of distal edge of sixth sternite, with extending lateral corners.

Comments. Closely related to walkerana but easily distinguished by more black pattern and white blotch of ground colour at forewing costa. As regards genitalia, the new species differs in having the rounded end of the sacculus, larger aedeagus and very large, spined caulis.

For a key to the terms used, see Glossary of entomology terms.

== Occurrences ==
Only one occurrence has been recorded (Peru), via the NHMD Entomology Collection. Razowski does not cite the overall genus Phalonidia as endemic to Peru, but he offers no elaboration regarding specific P. species.
