= Phalonidia aliena =

Scientific classification
- Domain: Eukaryota
- Kingdom: Animalia
- Phylum: Arthropoda
- Class: Insecta
- Order: Lepidoptera
- Family: Tortricidae
- Genus: Phalonidia
- Species: P. aliena

Binomial name
- Phalonidia aliena Kuznetzov, 1966

Species of moth

Phalonidia aliena is a species of moth of the family Tortricidae. It is found in China (Liaoning), Japan, Korea and the Russian Far East.

The wingspan is about 11 mm.

== Taxonomy ==
The species was previously treated as a synonym of Phalonidia albipalpana.
