= Phalonidia argyraspis =

Scientific classification
- Kingdom: Animalia
- Phylum: Arthropoda
- Class: Insecta
- Order: Lepidoptera
- Family: Tortricidae
- Genus: Phalonidia
- Species: P. argyraspis

Binomial name
- Phalonidia argyraspis (Razowski, 1984)

Synonyms
- Saphenista argyraspis Razowski, 1984

Species of moth

Phalonidia argyraspis is a species of moth of the family Tortricidae. It is found in Venezuela.
