= Phalonidia rotundiventralis =

Scientific classification
- Domain: Eukaryota
- Kingdom: Animalia
- Phylum: Arthropoda
- Class: Insecta
- Order: Lepidoptera
- Family: Tortricidae
- Genus: Phalonidia
- Species: P. rotundiventralis

Binomial name
- Phalonidia rotundiventralis Y.H. Sun & H.H. Li, 2013

Species of moth

Phalonidia rotundiventralis is a species of moth of the family Tortricidae. It is found in Sichuan, China.

The wingspan is about 11 mm.
