= Phalonidia vorticata =

Scientific classification
- Kingdom: Animalia
- Phylum: Arthropoda
- Class: Insecta
- Order: Lepidoptera
- Family: Tortricidae
- Genus: Phalonidia
- Species: P. vorticata

Binomial name
- Phalonidia vorticata (Meyrick, 1912)

Synonyms
- Phalonia vorticata Meyrick, 1912; Phalonidia vorticana Razowski, in Heppner, 1995

Species of moth

Phalonidia vorticata is a species of moth of the family Tortricidae. It is found in Argentina.
