= Phalonidia ochrimixtana =

Scientific classification
- Kingdom: Animalia
- Phylum: Arthropoda
- Clade: Pancrustacea
- Class: Insecta
- Order: Lepidoptera
- Family: Tortricidae
- Genus: Phalonidia
- Species: P. ochrimixtana

Binomial name
- Phalonidia ochrimixtana (Zeller, 1877)

Synonyms
- Conchylis ochrimixtana Zeller, 1877

Species of moth

Phalonidia ochrimixtana is a species of moth of the family Tortricidae. It is found in Colombia.
