= Terinebrica complicata =

Scientific classification
- Kingdom: Animalia
- Phylum: Arthropoda
- Clade: Pancrustacea
- Class: Insecta
- Order: Lepidoptera
- Family: Tortricidae
- Genus: Terinebrica
- Species: T. complicata

Binomial name
- Terinebrica complicata Razowski & Becker, 2001

Species of moth

Terinebrica complicata is a species of moth of the family Tortricidae. It is found in Rio de Janeiro, Brazil.
