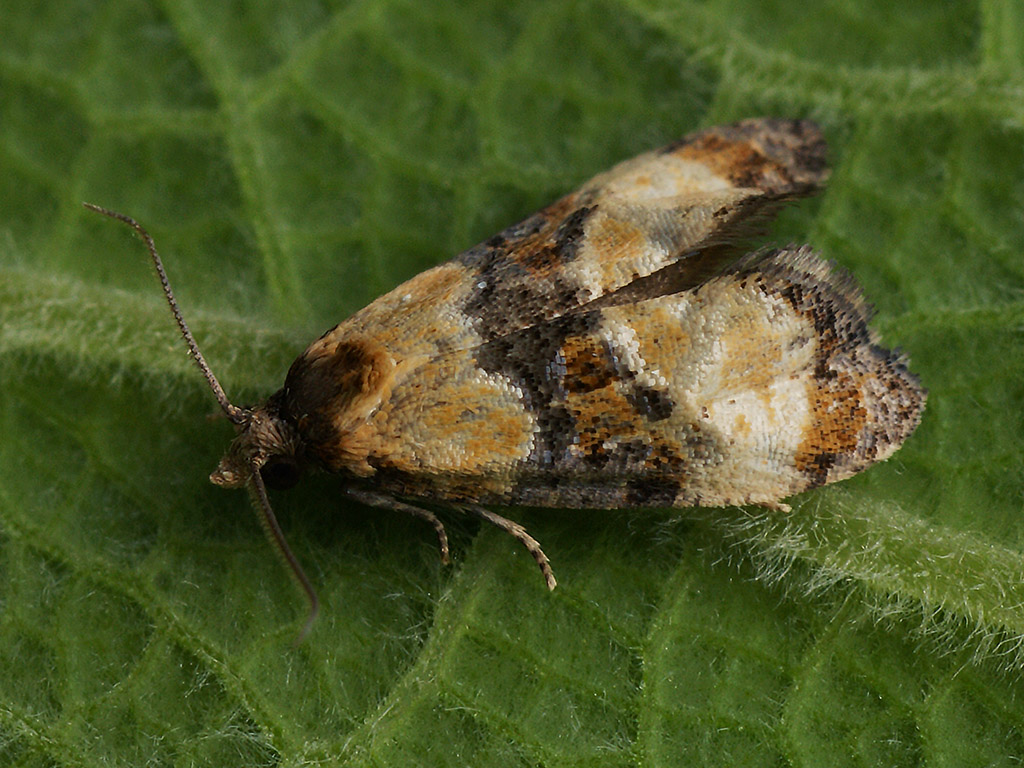

Scientific classification
- Kingdom: Animalia
- Phylum: Arthropoda
- Clade: Pancrustacea
- Class: Insecta
- Order: Lepidoptera
- Family: Tortricidae
- Genus: Phalonidia
- Species: P. curvistrigana

Binomial name
- Phalonidia curvistrigana (Stainton, 1859)

Synonyms
- Eupoecilia curvistrigana Stainton, 1859

= Phalonidia curvistrigana =

Species of moth

Phalonidia curvistrigana, the golden-rod conch, is a species of moth of the family Tortricidae. It is found in China (Anhui, Beijing, Gansu, Guizhou, Heilongjiang, Shaanxi), Japan, Korea, Russia and most of Europe. The habitat consists of woodland and scrubland.

The wingspan is 11−16 mm. Adults are on wing from June to August.

The larvae feed on Prenanthes and Solidago species, as well as Mycelis muralis and Glycine max. They feed within the flowers of their host plant.
