= Phalonidia coreana =

Scientific classification
- Domain: Eukaryota
- Kingdom: Animalia
- Phylum: Arthropoda
- Class: Insecta
- Order: Lepidoptera
- Family: Tortricidae
- Genus: Phalonidia
- Species: P. coreana

Binomial name
- Phalonidia coreana Byun & Li, 2006

Species of moth

Phalonidia coreana is a species of moth of the family Tortricidae. It is found in China (Guizhou, Henan) and Korea.

The wingspan is about 14 mm.
