= Phalonidia lojana =

Scientific classification
- Kingdom: Animalia
- Phylum: Arthropoda
- Clade: Pancrustacea
- Class: Insecta
- Order: Lepidoptera
- Family: Tortricidae
- Genus: Phalonidia
- Species: P. lojana

Binomial name
- Phalonidia lojana Razowski & Becker, 2002

Species of moth

Phalonidia lojana is a species of moth of the family Tortricidae. It is found in Loja Province, Ecuador.

The wingspan is about 21 mm.
