= Phalonidia californica =

Scientific classification
- Kingdom: Animalia
- Phylum: Arthropoda
- Class: Insecta
- Order: Lepidoptera
- Family: Tortricidae
- Genus: Phalonidia
- Species: P. californica

Binomial name
- Phalonidia californica (Razowski, 1986)

Synonyms
- Platphalonidia californica Razowski, 1986

Species of moth

Phalonidia californica is a species of moth of the family Tortricidae. It is found in Baja California, Mexico.
