= Phalonidia sublimis =

Scientific classification
- Kingdom: Animalia
- Phylum: Arthropoda
- Class: Insecta
- Order: Lepidoptera
- Family: Tortricidae
- Genus: Phalonidia
- Species: P. sublimis

Binomial name
- Phalonidia sublimis (Meyrick, 1917)

Synonyms
- Phalonia sublimis Meyrick, 1917; Platphalonidia sublimis

Species of moth

Phalonidia sublimis is a species of moth of the family Tortricidae. It is found in Peru.
