= Phalonidia mendora =

Scientific classification
- Kingdom: Animalia
- Phylum: Arthropoda
- Class: Insecta
- Order: Lepidoptera
- Family: Tortricidae
- Genus: Phalonidia
- Species: P. mendora

Binomial name
- Phalonidia mendora (Clarke, 1968)

Synonyms
- Cochylis mendora Clarke, 1968; Platphalonidia mendora

Species of moth

Phalonidia mendora is a species of moth of the family Tortricidae. It is found in Santiago Province, Chile.
