= Phalonidia olivana =

Scientific classification
- Kingdom: Animalia
- Phylum: Arthropoda
- Class: Insecta
- Order: Lepidoptera
- Family: Tortricidae
- Genus: Phalonidia
- Species: P. olivana

Binomial name
- Phalonidia olivana (Razowski, 1967)

Synonyms
- Cochylis olivana Razowski, 1967

Species of moth

Phalonidia olivana is a species of moth of the family Tortricidae. It is found in Paraná, Brazil.
