= Terinebrica pharetrata =

Scientific classification
- Kingdom: Animalia
- Phylum: Arthropoda
- Class: Insecta
- Order: Lepidoptera
- Family: Tortricidae
- Genus: Terinebrica
- Species: T. pharetrata

Binomial name
- Terinebrica pharetrata Razowski, 1987

Species of moth

Terinebrica pharetrata is a species of moth of the family Tortricidae. It is found in Argentina.
