= Phalonidia tehuacana =

Scientific classification
- Kingdom: Animalia
- Phylum: Arthropoda
- Class: Insecta
- Order: Lepidoptera
- Family: Tortricidae
- Genus: Phalonidia
- Species: P. tehuacana

Binomial name
- Phalonidia tehuacana (Razowski, 1986)

Synonyms
- Platphalonidia tehuacana Razowski, 1986

Species of moth

Phalonidia tehuacana is a species of moth of the family Tortricidae. It is found in Puebla, Mexico.
