= Phalonidia dysmorphia =

Scientific classification
- Domain: Eukaryota
- Kingdom: Animalia
- Phylum: Arthropoda
- Class: Insecta
- Order: Lepidoptera
- Family: Tortricidae
- Genus: Phalonidia
- Species: P. dysmorphia

Binomial name
- Phalonidia dysmorphia (Clarke, 1968)

Synonyms
- Lasiothyris dysmorphia Clarke, 1968

Species of moth

Phalonidia dysmorphia is a species of moth of the family Tortricidae. It is found in Bolivia.
