= Phalonidia zygota =

Scientific classification
- Kingdom: Animalia
- Phylum: Arthropoda
- Class: Insecta
- Order: Lepidoptera
- Family: Tortricidae
- Genus: Phalonidia
- Species: P. zygota

Binomial name
- Phalonidia zygota Razowski, 1964

Species of moth

Phalonidia zygota is a species of moth of the family Tortricidae. It is found in China (Beijing, Gansu, Hebei, Heilongjiang, Inner Mongolia, Jilin, Qinghai, Shandong, Tianjin), Japan, Korea, Mongolia and Russia.

The wingspan is 14–16 mm.
