= Phalonidia laetitia =

Scientific classification
- Domain: Eukaryota
- Kingdom: Animalia
- Phylum: Arthropoda
- Class: Insecta
- Order: Lepidoptera
- Family: Tortricidae
- Genus: Phalonidia
- Species: P. laetitia

Binomial name
- Phalonidia laetitia (Clarke, 1968)

Synonyms
- Cochylis laetitia Clarke, 1968; Platphalonidia laetitia

Species of moth

Phalonidia laetitia is a species of moth of the family Tortricidae. It is found in Argentina.
