= Phalonidia brevifasciaria =

Scientific classification
- Domain: Eukaryota
- Kingdom: Animalia
- Phylum: Arthropoda
- Class: Insecta
- Order: Lepidoptera
- Family: Tortricidae
- Genus: Phalonidia
- Species: P. brevifasciaria

Binomial name
- Phalonidia brevifasciaria Y.H. Sun & H.H. Li, 2013

Species of moth

Phalonidia brevifasciaria is a species of moth of the family Tortricidae. It is found in Guizhou, China.

The wingspan is about 11.5 mm.
