= Razowskiina senilis =

Scientific classification
- Kingdom: Animalia
- Phylum: Arthropoda
- Class: Insecta
- Order: Lepidoptera
- Family: Tortricidae
- Genus: Razowskiina
- Species: R. senilis

Binomial name
- Razowskiina senilis (Razowski, 1987)

Synonyms
- Silenis senilis Razowski, 1987

Species of moth

Razowskiina senilis is a species of moth of the family Tortricidae. It is found in Bolivia.
