= Phalonidia hapalobursa =

Scientific classification
- Kingdom: Animalia
- Phylum: Arthropoda
- Clade: Pancrustacea
- Class: Insecta
- Order: Lepidoptera
- Family: Tortricidae
- Genus: Phalonidia
- Species: P. hapalobursa

Binomial name
- Phalonidia hapalobursa Razowski & Becker, 1986

Synonyms
- Phalonidia haplobursa Razowski, in Heppner, 1995

Species of moth

Phalonidia hapalobursa is a species of moth of the family Tortricidae. It is found in Costa Rica.
