= Mourecochylis dentipara =

Scientific classification
- Kingdom: Animalia
- Phylum: Arthropoda
- Clade: Pancrustacea
- Class: Insecta
- Order: Lepidoptera
- Family: Tortricidae
- Genus: Mourecochylis
- Species: M. dentipara

Binomial name
- Mourecochylis dentipara Razowski & Becker, 2002

Species of moth

Mourecochylis dentipara is a species of moth of the family Tortricidae. It is found in Carchi Province, Ecuador.

The wingspan is about 12 mm.
