= Phalonidia assector =

Scientific classification
- Kingdom: Animalia
- Phylum: Arthropoda
- Class: Insecta
- Order: Lepidoptera
- Family: Tortricidae
- Genus: Phalonidia
- Species: P. assector

Binomial name
- Phalonidia assector (Razowski, 1967)

Synonyms
- Cochylis assector Razowski, 1967; Platphalonidia assector

Species of moth

Phalonidia assector is a species of moth of the family Tortricidae. It is found in Argentina.
