= Phalonidia chloridia =

Scientific classification
- Kingdom: Animalia
- Phylum: Arthropoda
- Class: Insecta
- Order: Lepidoptera
- Family: Tortricidae
- Genus: Phalonidia
- Species: P. chloridia

Binomial name
- Phalonidia chloridia Razowski & Becker, 1994

Species of moth

Phalonidia chloridia is a species of moth of the family Tortricidae. It is found in the Federal District of Brazil.
