= Phalonidia thryptica =

Scientific classification
- Kingdom: Animalia
- Phylum: Arthropoda
- Class: Insecta
- Order: Lepidoptera
- Family: Tortricidae
- Genus: Phalonidia
- Species: P. thryptica

Binomial name
- Phalonidia thryptica Razowski, 1994

Species of moth

Phalonidia thryptica is a species of moth of the family Tortricidae. It is found in Costa Rica.
