= Phalonidia albertae =

Scientific classification
- Kingdom: Animalia
- Phylum: Arthropoda
- Class: Insecta
- Order: Lepidoptera
- Family: Tortricidae
- Genus: Phalonidia
- Species: P. albertae

Binomial name
- Phalonidia albertae (Razowski, 1997)

Synonyms
- Platphalonidia albertae Razowski, 1997

Species of moth

Phalonidia albertae is a species of moth of the family Tortricidae. It is found in North America, where it has been recorded from Alberta and Maryland.

Adults have been recorded on wing from April to September.
