= Phalonidia fariasana =

Scientific classification
- Kingdom: Animalia
- Phylum: Arthropoda
- Clade: Pancrustacea
- Class: Insecta
- Order: Lepidoptera
- Family: Tortricidae
- Genus: Phalonidia
- Species: P. fariasana

Binomial name
- Phalonidia fariasana Razowski & Becker, 2007

Species of moth

Phalonidia fariasana is a species of moth of the family Tortricidae. It is found in Tamaulipas, Mexico.

The wingspan is about 18 mm.

== Etymology ==
The species name refers to Gomez Farias, the type locality.
