= Phalonidia ontariana =

Scientific classification
- Kingdom: Animalia
- Phylum: Arthropoda
- Class: Insecta
- Order: Lepidoptera
- Family: Tortricidae
- Genus: Phalonidia
- Species: P. ontariana

Binomial name
- Phalonidia ontariana Razowski, 1997

Species of moth

Phalonidia ontariana is a species of moth of the family Tortricidae. It is found in North America, where it has been recorded from Ontario, Minnesota and Wisconsin.

Adults have been recorded on wing in June.
