= Phalonidia paranae =

Scientific classification
- Kingdom: Animalia
- Phylum: Arthropoda
- Clade: Pancrustacea
- Class: Insecta
- Order: Lepidoptera
- Family: Tortricidae
- Genus: Phalonidia
- Species: P. paranae

Binomial name
- Phalonidia paranae (Razowski & Becker, 1983)

Synonyms
- Saphenista paranae Razowski & Becker, 1983; Platphalonidia paranae

Species of moth

Phalonidia paranae is a species of moth of the family Tortricidae. It is found in Paraná, Brazil.
