= Phalonidia droserantha =

Scientific classification
- Kingdom: Animalia
- Phylum: Arthropoda
- Class: Insecta
- Order: Lepidoptera
- Family: Tortricidae
- Genus: Phalonidia
- Species: P. droserantha

Binomial name
- Phalonidia droserantha Razowski, 1970

Species of moth

Phalonidia droserantha is a species of moth of the family Tortricidae. It is found in Yunnan, China.
