= Phalonidia mayarina =

Scientific classification
- Kingdom: Animalia
- Phylum: Arthropoda
- Clade: Pancrustacea
- Class: Insecta
- Order: Lepidoptera
- Family: Tortricidae
- Genus: Phalonidia
- Species: P. mayarina

Binomial name
- Phalonidia mayarina Razowski & Becker, 2007

Species of moth

Phalonidia mayarina is a species of moth of the family Tortricidae. The only known specimen of this moth had a wingspan of 18.5 mm (0.73 in). The forewing is cream with a brown-yellow wash, maculated with a yellowish-brown dorsal blotch, a brown blotch on the costa, and a black dot near the tornus. The hindwing is brown-gray with concolorous cilia. It is a Cuban endemic, being known only from its type locality in the municipality Mayarí in the province of Holguín. It was collected at an elevation of 400 m (1,300 ft).

== Taxonomy ==
Phalonidia mayarina was formally described by the Polish entomologist Józef Razowski and the Brazilian entomologist Vitor Osmar Becker in 2007 based on a female collected from the municipality of Mayarí in the province of Holguín in Cuba.

== Description ==
The only known specimen of this moth had a wingspan of 18.5 mm (0.73 in). Both the dorsal and ventral surfaces of the forewing are largely cream with a brown-yellow wash. The wings are maculated dorsally with a yellowish-brown blotch at a third of the wing's length from the base, as well as another brown blotch medially along the costa and a black dot near the tornus. All of these maculations are surrounded by a margin of cream, lacking the brown-yellow hue found on the rest of the forewing. The cilia of the forewing are colored cream. The dorsal and ventral surfaces of the hindwing are brown-gray with concolorous cilia. The thorax is a yellow-brown hued cream color, while the head is just cream.

== Distribution ==
Phalonidia mayarina is a Cuban endemic, being known only from its type locality of Mayarí in the province of Holguín. It was collected at an elevation of 400 m (1,300 ft).
