= Phalonidia dysodona =

Scientific classification
- Domain: Eukaryota
- Kingdom: Animalia
- Phylum: Arthropoda
- Class: Insecta
- Order: Lepidoptera
- Family: Tortricidae
- Genus: Phalonidia
- Species: P. dysodona

Binomial name
- Phalonidia dysodona (Caradja, 1916)

Synonyms
- Lasiothyris dysodona Caradja, 1916

Species of moth

Phalonidia dysodona is a species of moth of the family Tortricidae. It is found in China (Heilongjiang) and Russia. The habitat consists of wet meadows and mesic grasslands.

Adults have been recorded on wing from May to August.
