= Mourecochylis limenarchis =

Scientific classification
- Kingdom: Animalia
- Phylum: Arthropoda
- Class: Insecta
- Order: Lepidoptera
- Family: Tortricidae
- Genus: Mourecochylis
- Species: M. limenarchis

Binomial name
- Mourecochylis limenarchis Razowski, 1986

Species of moth

Mourecochylis limenarchis is a species of moth of the family Tortricidae. It is found in Costa Rica.
