= Phalonidia cerina =

Scientific classification
- Kingdom: Animalia
- Phylum: Arthropoda
- Clade: Pancrustacea
- Class: Insecta
- Order: Lepidoptera
- Family: Tortricidae
- Genus: Phalonidia
- Species: P. cerina

Binomial name
- Phalonidia cerina Razowski & Becker, 2007

Species of moth

Phalonidia cerina is a species of moth of the family Tortricidae first described by Józef Razowski and Vitor Osmar Becker in 2007. It is found in Espírito Santo, Brazil.

The wingspan is about 8 mm.
