= Phalonidia tenuispiniformis =

Scientific classification
- Domain: Eukaryota
- Kingdom: Animalia
- Phylum: Arthropoda
- Class: Insecta
- Order: Lepidoptera
- Family: Tortricidae
- Genus: Phalonidia
- Species: P. tenuispiniformis

Binomial name
- Phalonidia tenuispiniformis Y.H. Sun & H.H. Li, 2013

Species of moth

Phalonidia tenuispiniformis is a species of moth of the family Tortricidae. It is found in China (Beijing, Tianjin).

The wingspan is 12−14 mm.
