= Phalonidia parapellax =

Scientific classification
- Kingdom: Animalia
- Phylum: Arthropoda
- Class: Insecta
- Order: Lepidoptera
- Family: Tortricidae
- Genus: Phalonidia
- Species: P. parapellax

Binomial name
- Phalonidia parapellax Razowski, 1999

Species of moth

Phalonidia parapellax is a species of moth of the family Tortricidae. It is found in Sinaloa, Mexico.
