= Phalonidia cermatia =

Scientific classification
- Kingdom: Animalia
- Phylum: Arthropoda
- Clade: Pancrustacea
- Class: Insecta
- Order: Lepidoptera
- Family: Tortricidae
- Genus: Phalonidia
- Species: P. cermatia

Binomial name
- Phalonidia cermatia Razowski & Becker, 2002

Species of moth

Phalonidia cermatia is a species of moth of the family Tortricidae. It is found in the Federal District of Brazil.

The wingspan is about 8.5 millimetres (0.33 in).
