= Marylinka mimera =

Scientific classification
- Kingdom: Animalia
- Phylum: Arthropoda
- Clade: Pancrustacea
- Class: Insecta
- Order: Lepidoptera
- Family: Tortricidae
- Genus: Marylinka
- Species: M. mimera

Binomial name
- Marylinka mimera Razowski & Becker, 1983

Species of moth

Marylinka mimera is a species of moth of the family Tortricidae. It is found in Paraná, Brazil.
