= Sychnovalva chreostes =

Scientific classification
- Kingdom: Animalia
- Phylum: Arthropoda
- Clade: Pancrustacea
- Class: Insecta
- Order: Lepidoptera
- Family: Tortricidae
- Genus: Sychnovalva
- Species: S. chreostes

Binomial name
- Sychnovalva chreostes Razowski & Becker, 2000

Species of moth

Sychnovalva chreostes is a species of moth of the family Tortricidae. It is found in Paraná, Brazil.
