= Phalonidia remissa =

Scientific classification
- Kingdom: Animalia
- Phylum: Arthropoda
- Clade: Pancrustacea
- Class: Insecta
- Order: Lepidoptera
- Family: Tortricidae
- Genus: Phalonidia
- Species: P. remissa

Binomial name
- Phalonidia remissa (Razowski & Becker, 2007)

Synonyms
- Platphalonidia remissa Razowski & Becker, 2007

Species of moth

Phalonidia remissa is a species of moth in the family Tortricidae. It is found in Cuba.

The wingspan of this moth is approximately 8.5 mm.
