= Phalonidia fraterna =

Scientific classification
- Kingdom: Animalia
- Phylum: Arthropoda
- Class: Insecta
- Order: Lepidoptera
- Family: Tortricidae
- Genus: Phalonidia
- Species: P. fraterna

Binomial name
- Phalonidia fraterna Razowski, 1970

Species of moth

Phalonidia fraterna is a species of moth of the family Tortricidae. It is found in China (Heilongjiang, Henan), Korea and Russia.

The wingspan is 14−16 mm.
