= Sychnovalva =

Scientific classification
- Kingdom: Animalia
- Phylum: Arthropoda
- Class: Insecta
- Order: Lepidoptera
- Family: Tortricidae
- Tribe: Archipini
- Genus: Sychnovalva; Razowski, 1997

Genus of tortrix moths

Sychnovalva is a genus of moths belonging to the family Tortricidae.

== Species ==
- Sychnovalva chreostes Razowski & Becker, 2000
- Sychnovalva crocea Razowski & Becker, 2000
- Sychnovalva flavida Razowski & Wojtusiak, 2008
- Sychnovalva simillima Razowski & Becker, 2010
- Sychnovalva syrrhapta Razowski, 1997

== See also ==
- List of Tortricidae genera
