= Phalonidia luxata =

Scientific classification
- Kingdom: Animalia
- Phylum: Arthropoda
- Clade: Pancrustacea
- Class: Insecta
- Order: Lepidoptera
- Family: Tortricidae
- Genus: Phalonidia
- Species: P. luxata

Binomial name
- Phalonidia luxata (Razowski & Becker, 1986)

Synonyms
- Platphalonidia luxata Razowski & Becker, 1986

Species of moth

Phalonidia luxata is a species of moth of the family Tortricidae. It is found in the Federal District of Mexico.
