= Phalonidia albicaput =

Scientific classification
- Kingdom: Animalia
- Phylum: Arthropoda
- Clade: Pancrustacea
- Class: Insecta
- Order: Lepidoptera
- Family: Tortricidae
- Genus: Phalonidia
- Species: P. albicaput

Binomial name
- Phalonidia albicaput Razowski & Becker, 2002

Species of moth

Phalonidia albicaput is a species of moth of the family Tortricidae. It is found in Ecuador.

The wingspan is 11–12 mm.
