= Phalonidia hypagosocia =

Scientific classification
- Kingdom: Animalia
- Phylum: Arthropoda
- Class: Insecta
- Order: Lepidoptera
- Family: Tortricidae
- Genus: Phalonidia
- Species: P. hypagosocia

Binomial name
- Phalonidia hypagosocia Razowski, 1993

Species of moth

Phalonidia hypagosocia is a species of moth of the family Tortricidae. It is found in Bolivia.
