= Sychnovalva simillima =

Scientific classification
- Kingdom: Animalia
- Phylum: Arthropoda
- Clade: Pancrustacea
- Class: Insecta
- Order: Lepidoptera
- Family: Tortricidae
- Genus: Sychnovalva
- Species: S. simillima

Binomial name
- Sychnovalva simillima Razowski & Becker, 2010

Species of moth

Sychnovalva simillima is a species of moth of the family Tortricidae. It is found in Brazil in the states of Paraná, Santa Catarina and Minas Gerais.

The wingspan is about 18 mm.

== Etymology ==
The species name refers to its great similarity with Sychnovalva syrrhapta.
