= Phalonidia parvana =

Scientific classification
- Kingdom: Animalia
- Phylum: Arthropoda
- Class: Insecta
- Order: Lepidoptera
- Family: Tortricidae
- Genus: Phalonidia
- Species: P. parvana

Binomial name
- Phalonidia parvana Kawabe, 1980

Species of moth

Phalonidia parvana is a species of moth of the family Tortricidae. It is found in Japan on the island of Honshu.
