= Terinebrica spinodela =

Scientific classification
- Kingdom: Animalia
- Phylum: Arthropoda
- Clade: Pancrustacea
- Class: Insecta
- Order: Lepidoptera
- Family: Tortricidae
- Genus: Terinebrica
- Species: T. spinodela

Binomial name
- Terinebrica spinodela Razowski, 1997

Species of moth

Terinebrica spinodela is a species of leaf roller moth of the family Tortricidae. It is found in Peru.
