= Razowskiina eurydice =

Scientific classification
- Kingdom: Animalia
- Phylum: Arthropoda
- Class: Insecta
- Order: Lepidoptera
- Family: Tortricidae
- Genus: Razowskiina
- Species: R. eurydice

Binomial name
- Razowskiina eurydice (Butler, 1883)

Synonyms
- Sericoris eurydice Butler, 1883; Silenis eurydice

Species of moth

Razowskiina eurydice is a species of moth of the family Tortricidae. It is found in Valparaíso Region, Chile.
