= Phalonidia swammerdamiana =

Scientific classification
- Kingdom: Animalia
- Phylum: Arthropoda
- Clade: Pancrustacea
- Class: Insecta
- Order: Lepidoptera
- Family: Tortricidae
- Genus: Phalonidia
- Species: P. swammerdamiana

Binomial name
- Phalonidia swammerdamiana Zeller, 1877

Species of moth

Phalonidia swammerdamiana is a species of moth of the family Tortricidae. It is found in Colombia.
