= Phalonidia alassosaccula =

Scientific classification
- Kingdom: Animalia
- Phylum: Arthropoda
- Class: Insecta
- Order: Lepidoptera
- Family: Tortricidae
- Genus: Phalonidia
- Species: P. alassosaccula

Binomial name
- Phalonidia alassosaccula Razowski, 1997

Species of moth

Phalonidia alassosaccula is a species of moth of the family Tortricidae. It is found in Peru.
