= Phalonidia embaphion =

Scientific classification
- Kingdom: Animalia
- Phylum: Arthropoda
- Class: Insecta
- Order: Lepidoptera
- Family: Tortricidae
- Genus: Phalonidia
- Species: P. embaphion

Binomial name
- Phalonidia embaphion (Razowski, 1984)

Synonyms
- Saphenista embaphion Razowski, 1984

Species of moth

Phalonidia embaphion is a species of moth of the family Tortricidae. It is found in Venezuela.
