= Phalonidia fusifera =

Scientific classification
- Kingdom: Animalia
- Phylum: Arthropoda
- Class: Insecta
- Order: Lepidoptera
- Family: Tortricidae
- Genus: Phalonidia
- Species: P. fusifera

Binomial name
- Phalonidia fusifera (Meyrick, 1912)

Synonyms
- Phtheochroa fusifera Meyrick, 1912; Platphalonidia fusifera

Species of moth

Phalonidia fusifera is a species of moth of the family Tortricidae. It is found in São Paulo, Brazil.
