= Razowskiina elcedranus =

Scientific classification
- Domain: Eukaryota
- Kingdom: Animalia
- Phylum: Arthropoda
- Class: Insecta
- Order: Lepidoptera
- Family: Tortricidae
- Genus: Razowskiina
- Species: R. elcedranus

Binomial name
- Razowskiina elcedranus (Razowski & Wojtusiak, 2010)

Synonyms
- Silenis elcedranus Razowski & Wojtusiak, 2010

Species of moth

Razowskiina elcedranus is a species of moth of the family Tortricidae. It is found in Peru.

The wingspan is 16 mm.

== Etymology ==
The species name refers to the type locality, El Cedro.
