= Razowskiina fortunearia =

Scientific classification
- Kingdom: Animalia
- Phylum: Arthropoda
- Class: Insecta
- Order: Lepidoptera
- Family: Tortricidae
- Genus: Razowskiina
- Species: R. fortunearia

Binomial name
- Razowskiina fortunearia (Razowski, 1991)

Synonyms
- Silenis fortunearia Razowski, 1991

Species of moth

Razowskiina fortunearia is a species of moth of the family Tortricidae. It is found in Paraná, Brazil.
