= Terinebrica phaloniodes =

Scientific classification
- Kingdom: Animalia
- Phylum: Arthropoda
- Class: Insecta
- Order: Lepidoptera
- Family: Tortricidae
- Genus: Terinebrica
- Species: T. phaloniodes

Binomial name
- Terinebrica phaloniodes (Meyrick, 1932)

Synonyms
- Eulia phaloniodes Meyrick, 1932

Species of moth

Terinebrica phaloniodes is a species of moth of the family Tortricidae. It is found in Santa Catarina, Brazil.
