= Marylinka =

Scientific classification
- Kingdom: Animalia
- Phylum: Arthropoda
- Clade: Pancrustacea
- Class: Insecta
- Order: Lepidoptera
- Family: Tortricidae
- Tribe: Cochylini
- Genus: Marylinka; Razowski & Becker, 1983

Genus of tortrix moths

Marylinka is a genus of moths belonging to the family Tortricidae.

== Species ==
- Marylinka mimera Razowski & Becker, 1983
- Marylinka secunda Razowski & Becker, 2007

== See also ==
- List of Tortricidae genera
