= Phalonidia bassii =

Scientific classification
- Kingdom: Animalia
- Phylum: Arthropoda
- Class: Insecta
- Order: Lepidoptera
- Family: Tortricidae
- Genus: Phalonidia
- Species: P. bassii

Binomial name
- Phalonidia bassii Razowski, 1999

Species of moth

Phalonidia bassii is a species of moth of the family Tortricidae. It is found in Napo Province, Ecuador.
