= Phalonidia ochracea =

Scientific classification
- Kingdom: Animalia
- Phylum: Arthropoda
- Class: Insecta
- Order: Lepidoptera
- Family: Tortricidae
- Genus: Phalonidia
- Species: P. ochracea

Binomial name
- Phalonidia ochracea Razowski, 1967

Species of moth

Phalonidia ochracea is a species of moth of the family Tortricidae. It is found in Chimborazo Province, Ecuador.
