= Phalonidia latipunctana =

Scientific classification
- Domain: Eukaryota
- Kingdom: Animalia
- Phylum: Arthropoda
- Class: Insecta
- Order: Lepidoptera
- Family: Tortricidae
- Genus: Phalonidia
- Species: P. latipunctana

Binomial name
- Phalonidia latipunctana (Walsingham, 1879)

Synonyms
- Cochylis latipunctana Walsingham, 1879

Species of moth

Phalonidia latipunctana is a species of moth of the family Tortricidae. It is found in the United States, where it has been recorded from California, Washington and Maine.

Adults have been recorded on wing in March and from May to September.
