= Sychnovalva flavida =

Scientific classification
- Domain: Eukaryota
- Kingdom: Animalia
- Phylum: Arthropoda
- Class: Insecta
- Order: Lepidoptera
- Family: Tortricidae
- Genus: Sychnovalva
- Species: S. flavida

Binomial name
- Sychnovalva flavida Razowski & Wojtusiak, 2008

Species of moth

Sychnovalva flavida is a species of moth of the family Tortricidae. It is found in Loja Province, Ecuador.

The wingspan is about 21 mm.

== Etymology ==
The species name refers to the colouration of the forewings and is derived from Latin flavida (meaning yellowish).
