= Phalonidia diaphona =

Scientific classification
- Kingdom: Animalia
- Phylum: Arthropoda
- Clade: Pancrustacea
- Class: Insecta
- Order: Lepidoptera
- Family: Tortricidae
- Genus: Phalonidia
- Species: P. diaphona

Binomial name
- Phalonidia diaphona Razowski & Becker, 1986

Species of moth

Phalonidia diaphona is a species of moth of the family Tortricidae. It is found in Veracruz, Mexico.
