= Phalonidia melletes =

Scientific classification
- Kingdom: Animalia
- Phylum: Arthropoda
- Clade: Pancrustacea
- Class: Insecta
- Order: Lepidoptera
- Family: Tortricidae
- Genus: Phalonidia
- Species: P. melletes

Binomial name
- Phalonidia melletes Razowski & Becker, 1994

Species of moth

Phalonidia melletes is a species of moth of the family Tortricidae. It is found in the Federal District of Brazil.
