= Phalonidia nonaxyra =

Scientific classification
- Kingdom: Animalia
- Phylum: Arthropoda
- Class: Insecta
- Order: Lepidoptera
- Family: Tortricidae
- Genus: Phalonidia
- Species: P. nonaxyra

Binomial name
- Phalonidia nonaxyra Razowski, 1994

Species of moth

Phalonidia nonaxyra is a species of moth of the family Tortricidae. It is found in Napo Province, Ecuador.
