= Phalonidia elderana =

Scientific classification
- Domain: Eukaryota
- Kingdom: Animalia
- Phylum: Arthropoda
- Class: Insecta
- Order: Lepidoptera
- Family: Tortricidae
- Genus: Phalonidia
- Species: P. elderana

Binomial name
- Phalonidia elderana (Kearfott, 1907)

Synonyms
- Phalonia elderana Kearfott, 1907; Phalonia helonoma Meyrick, 1912

Species of moth

Phalonidia elderana is a species of moth of the family Tortricidae. It is found in the United States, where it has been recorded from New Jersey.

The wingspan is about 13 mm. Adults have been recorded on wing in July.
