= Terinebrica inconspigua =

Scientific classification
- Kingdom: Animalia
- Phylum: Arthropoda
- Clade: Pancrustacea
- Class: Insecta
- Order: Lepidoptera
- Family: Tortricidae
- Genus: Terinebrica
- Species: T. inconspigua

Binomial name
- Terinebrica inconspigua Razowski & Becker, 2001

Synonyms
- Terinebrica inconspiqua Razowski & Becker, 2001

Species of moth

Terinebrica inconspigua is a species of moth of the family Tortricidae. It is found in Rio de Janeiro, Brazil.
