= Phalonidia linharesa =

Scientific classification
- Kingdom: Animalia
- Phylum: Arthropoda
- Clade: Pancrustacea
- Class: Insecta
- Order: Lepidoptera
- Family: Tortricidae
- Genus: Phalonidia
- Species: P. linharesa

Binomial name
- Phalonidia linharesa Razowski & Becker, 2007

Species of moth

Phalonidia linharesa is a species of moth of the family Tortricidae. It is found in Espírito Santo, Brazil.

The wingspan is about 7 mm.

== Etymology ==
The species name refers to Linhares, the type locality.
