= Phalonidia ochraceana =

Scientific classification
- Kingdom: Animalia
- Phylum: Arthropoda
- Class: Insecta
- Order: Lepidoptera
- Family: Tortricidae
- Genus: Phalonidia
- Species: P. ochraceana

Binomial name
- Phalonidia ochraceana (Razowski, 1967)

Synonyms
- Cochylis ochraceana Razowski, 1967; Platphalonidia ochraceana

Species of moth

Phalonidia ochraceana is a species of moth of the family Tortricidae. It is found in Argentina.
