= Terinebrica saetigera =

Scientific classification
- Kingdom: Animalia
- Phylum: Arthropoda
- Class: Insecta
- Order: Lepidoptera
- Family: Tortricidae
- Genus: Terinebrica
- Species: T. saetigera

Binomial name
- Terinebrica saetigera Razowski, 1987

Species of moth

Terinebrica saetigera is a species of moth of the family Tortricidae. It is found in Bolivia and Santa Catarina, Brazil.
