= Terinebrica tenebrica =

Scientific classification
- Kingdom: Animalia
- Phylum: Arthropoda
- Class: Insecta
- Order: Lepidoptera
- Family: Tortricidae
- Genus: Terinebrica
- Species: T. tenebrica

Binomial name
- Terinebrica tenebrica Razowski, 1987

Species of moth

Terinebrica tenebrica is a species of moth of the family Tortricidae. It is found in Peru.
