= Terinebrica polycornuta =

Scientific classification
- Kingdom: Animalia
- Phylum: Arthropoda
- Class: Insecta
- Order: Lepidoptera
- Family: Tortricidae
- Genus: Terinebrica
- Species: T. polycornuta

Binomial name
- Terinebrica polycornuta Razowski, 1999

Species of moth

Terinebrica polycornuta is a species of moth of the family Tortricidae. It is found in Ecuador.
