= Phalonidia latifasciana =

Scientific classification
- Kingdom: Animalia
- Phylum: Arthropoda
- Class: Insecta
- Order: Lepidoptera
- Family: Tortricidae
- Genus: Phalonidia
- Species: P. latifasciana

Binomial name
- Phalonidia latifasciana Razowski, 1970

Species of moth

Phalonidia latifasciana is a species of moth of the family Tortricidae. It is found in China (Jilin, Sichuan), Japan, Korea and Russia.

The wingspan is 12−18 mm.
