= Phalonidia tarijana =

Scientific classification
- Domain: Eukaryota
- Kingdom: Animalia
- Phylum: Arthropoda
- Class: Insecta
- Order: Lepidoptera
- Family: Tortricidae
- Genus: Phalonidia
- Species: P. tarijana

Binomial name
- Phalonidia tarijana Razowski & Wojtusiak, 2013

Species of insect

Phalonidia tarijana is a species of moth of the family Tortricidae. It is found in Bolivia.

The wingspan is about 23 mm.

== Etymology ==
The species name refers to Tarija Department in Bolivia.
