= Phalonidia ochrochraon =

Scientific classification
- Kingdom: Animalia
- Phylum: Arthropoda
- Clade: Pancrustacea
- Class: Insecta
- Order: Lepidoptera
- Family: Tortricidae
- Genus: Phalonidia
- Species: P. ochrochraon

Binomial name
- Phalonidia ochrochraon Razowski & Becker, 2002

Species of moth

Phalonidia ochrochraon is a species of moth of the family Tortricidae. It is found in Pará, Brazil.

The wingspan is about 8 mm.
