= Phalonidia scabra =

Scientific classification
- Domain: Eukaryota
- Kingdom: Animalia
- Phylum: Arthropoda
- Class: Insecta
- Order: Lepidoptera
- Family: Tortricidae
- Genus: Phalonidia
- Species: P. scabra

Binomial name
- Phalonidia scabra Liu & Ge, 1991

Species of moth

Phalonidia scabra is a species of moth of the family Tortricidae. It is found in China (Gansu, Guizhou, Heilongjiang, Jiangxi, Liaoning, Shanxi, Yunnan, Zhejiang) and Korea.

The wingspan is 12−14 mm.
