= Terinebrica =

Scientific classification
- Kingdom: Animalia
- Phylum: Arthropoda
- Class: Insecta
- Order: Lepidoptera
- Family: Tortricidae
- Subfamily: Tortricinae
- Tribe: Euliini
- Genus: Terinebrica; Razowski, 1987

Genus of tortrix moths

Terinebrica is a genus of moths belonging to the family Tortricidae.

== Species ==
- Terinebrica achrostos Razowski & Becker, 2001
- Terinebrica chaulioda Razowski & Becker, 2001
- Terinebrica cidna Razowski & Becker, 2001
- Terinebrica complicata Razowski & Becker, 2001
- Terinebrica cornicenthes Razowski & Becker, 2001
- Terinebrica fortifera Razowski, 1991
- Terinebrica inconspigua Razowski & Becker, 2001
- Terinebrica inouei Razowski, 1987
- Terinebrica larocana Razowski & Becker, 2001
- Terinebrica multidens Razowski & Wojtusiak, 2010
- Terinebrica orthoscia (Meyrick, 1936)
- Terinebrica paulista Razowski & Becker, 2001
- Terinebrica phaloniodes (Meyrick, 1932)
- Terinebrica pharetrata Razowski, 1987
- Terinebrica polycornuta Razowski, 1999
- Terinebrica polyseta Razowski & Becker, 2001
- Terinebrica portentifica Razowski & Becker, 2001
- Terinebrica saetigera Razowski, 1987
- Terinebrica seiugata Razowski, 1987
- Terinebrica spiniloba Razowski & Becker, 2001
- Terinebrica spinodela Razowski, 1997
- Terinebrica tenebrica Razowski, 1987
- Terinebrica triplex Razowski & Becker, 2001
- Terinebrica vectura Razowski & Becker, 2001

== See also ==
- List of Tortricidae genera
