= Phalonidia diamphidia =

Scientific classification
- Domain: Eukaryota
- Kingdom: Animalia
- Phylum: Arthropoda
- Class: Insecta
- Order: Lepidoptera
- Family: Tortricidae
- Genus: Phalonidia
- Species: P. diamphidia

Binomial name
- Phalonidia diamphidia (Clarke, 1968)

Synonyms
- Lasiothyris diamphidia Clarke, 1968

Species of moth

Phalonidia diamphidia is a species of moth of the family Tortricidae. It is found in Peru.
