= Phalonidia fulvimixta =

Scientific classification
- Domain: Eukaryota
- Kingdom: Animalia
- Phylum: Arthropoda
- Class: Insecta
- Order: Lepidoptera
- Family: Tortricidae
- Genus: Phalonidia
- Species: P. fulvimixta

Binomial name
- Phalonidia fulvimixta (Filipjev, 1940)

Synonyms
- Piercea fulvimixta Filipjev, 1940

Species of moth

Phalonidia fulvimixta is a species of moth of the family Tortricidae. It is found in Primorsky Krai in the Russian Far East and in China.
