= Phalonidia docilis =

Scientific classification
- Kingdom: Animalia
- Phylum: Arthropoda
- Clade: Pancrustacea
- Class: Insecta
- Order: Lepidoptera
- Family: Tortricidae
- Genus: Phalonidia
- Species: P. docilis

Binomial name
- Phalonidia docilis (Razowski & Becker, 2002)

Synonyms
- Lasiothyris docilis Razowski & Becker, 2002

Species of moth

Phalonidia docilis is a species of moth of the family Tortricidae. It is found in Rio de Janeiro, Brazil.
