= Phalonidia submissana =

Scientific classification
- Kingdom: Animalia
- Phylum: Arthropoda
- Clade: Pancrustacea
- Class: Insecta
- Order: Lepidoptera
- Family: Tortricidae
- Genus: Phalonidia
- Species: P. submissana

Binomial name
- Phalonidia submissana (Zeller, 1877)

Synonyms
- Conchylis submissana Zeller, 1877

Species of moth

Phalonidia submissana is a species of moth of the family Tortricidae. It is found in Colombia.
