= Phalonidia electra =

Scientific classification
- Kingdom: Animalia
- Phylum: Arthropoda
- Clade: Pancrustacea
- Class: Insecta
- Order: Lepidoptera
- Family: Tortricidae
- Genus: Phalonidia
- Species: P. electra

Binomial name
- Phalonidia electra Razowski & Becker, 2002

Species of moth

Phalonidia electra is a species of moth of the family Tortricidae. It is found in Carchi Province, Ecuador.

The wingspan is about 16.5 mm.
