= Platphalonia =

Planaltinella

Scientific classification
- Kingdom: Animalia
- Phylum: Arthropoda
- Class: Insecta
- Order: Lepidoptera
- Family: Tortricidae
- Tribe: Cochylini
- Genus: Platphalonia; Razowski, 2011

Genus of moths

Platphalonia is a genus of moths belonging to the family Tortricidae.

== Species ==
- Platphalonia mystica (Razowski & Becker, 1994)

== See also ==
- List of Tortricidae genera
