= Phalonidia melanothicta =

Scientific classification
- Kingdom: Animalia
- Phylum: Arthropoda
- Class: Insecta
- Order: Lepidoptera
- Family: Tortricidae
- Genus: Phalonidia
- Species: P. melanothicta

Binomial name
- Phalonidia melanothicta (Meyrick, 1927)

Synonyms
- Phalonia melanothicta Meyrick, 1927; Phalonia hygrodes Meyrick, 1936; Phalonia melanoticta Caradja, 1926

Species of moth

Phalonidia melanothicta is a species of moth of the family Tortricidae. It is found in China (Anhui, Fujian, Guangxi, Guizhou, Hubei, Hunan, Jiangxi, Ningxia, Sichuan, Yunnan, Zhejiang) and Japan.

The wingspan is 8.5−13 mm.
