= Terinebrica inouei =

Scientific classification
- Kingdom: Animalia
- Phylum: Arthropoda
- Class: Insecta
- Order: Lepidoptera
- Family: Tortricidae
- Genus: Terinebrica
- Species: T. inouei

Binomial name
- Terinebrica inouei Razowski, 1987

Species of moth

Terinebrica inouei is a species of moth of the family Tortricidae. It is found in Santa Catarina, Brazil.
