= Razowskiina =

Scientific classification
- Kingdom: Animalia
- Phylum: Arthropoda
- Class: Insecta
- Order: Lepidoptera
- Family: Tortricidae
- Tribe: Euliini
- Genus: Razowskiina; Kemal & Koçak, 2005

Species
- See text

Synonyms
- Silenis Razowski, 1987 (nec Silenis Neckaja, 1958)

Genus of tortrix moths

Razowskiina is a genus of moths belonging to the family Tortricidae.

== Species ==
- Razowskiina elcedranus (Razowski & Wojtusiak, 2010)
- Razowskiina eurydice (Butler, 1883)
- Razowskiina fortunearia (Razowski, 1991)
- Razowskiina glochina (Razowski & Becker, 1991)
- Razowskiina glomerula (Razowski & Becker, 1991)
- Razowskiina psychotria (Razowski & Becker, 1991)
- Razowskiina psydra (Razowski & Becker, 1991)
- Razowskiina ptilota (Razowski & Becker, 1991)
- Razowskiina senilis (Razowski, 1987)
