= Phalonidia trabalea =

Scientific classification
- Kingdom: Animalia
- Phylum: Arthropoda
- Class: Insecta
- Order: Lepidoptera
- Family: Tortricidae
- Genus: Phalonidia
- Species: P. trabalea

Binomial name
- Phalonidia trabalea Razowski & Becker, 1994

Species of moth

Phalonidia trabalea is a species of moth of the family Tortricidae. It is found in Brazil in the states of Pará and Goias.
