= Mourecochylis =

Scientific classification
- Kingdom: Animalia
- Phylum: Arthropoda
- Clade: Pancrustacea
- Class: Insecta
- Order: Lepidoptera
- Family: Tortricidae
- Tribe: Cochylini
- Genus: Mourecochylis; Razowski & Becker, 1983

Genus of tortrix moths

Mourecochylis is a genus of moths belonging to the family Tortricidae.

== Species ==
- Mourecochylis affecta (Razowski, 1986)
- Mourecochylis dentipara Razowski & Becker, 2002
- Mourecochylis limenarchis Razowski, 1986
- Mourecochylis mimosina (Razowski, 1986)
- Mourecochylis ramosa Razowski & Becker, 1983
- Mourecochylis stibeutes (Razowski, 1992)

== See also ==
- List of Tortricidae genera
