= Phalonidia plicana =

Scientific classification
- Domain: Eukaryota
- Kingdom: Animalia
- Phylum: Arthropoda
- Class: Insecta
- Order: Lepidoptera
- Family: Tortricidae
- Genus: Phalonidia
- Species: P. plicana

Binomial name
- Phalonidia plicana (Walsingham, 1884)

Synonyms
- Conchylis plicana Walsingham, 1884; Platphalonidia plicana

Species of moth

Phalonidia plicana is a species of moth of the family Tortricidae. It is found in North America in Sonora and California.

Adults have been recorded on wing in April and August.
