= Phalonidia decrepita =

Scientific classification
- Kingdom: Animalia
- Phylum: Arthropoda
- Clade: Pancrustacea
- Class: Insecta
- Order: Lepidoptera
- Family: Tortricidae
- Genus: Phalonidia
- Species: P. decrepita

Binomial name
- Phalonidia decrepita (Razowski & Becker, 2002)

Synonyms
- Platphalonidia decrepita Razowski & Becker, 2002

Species of moth

Phalonidia decrepita is a species of moth in the family Tortricidae. It is found in Goiás, Brazil.

The wingspan is about 11.5 mm.
