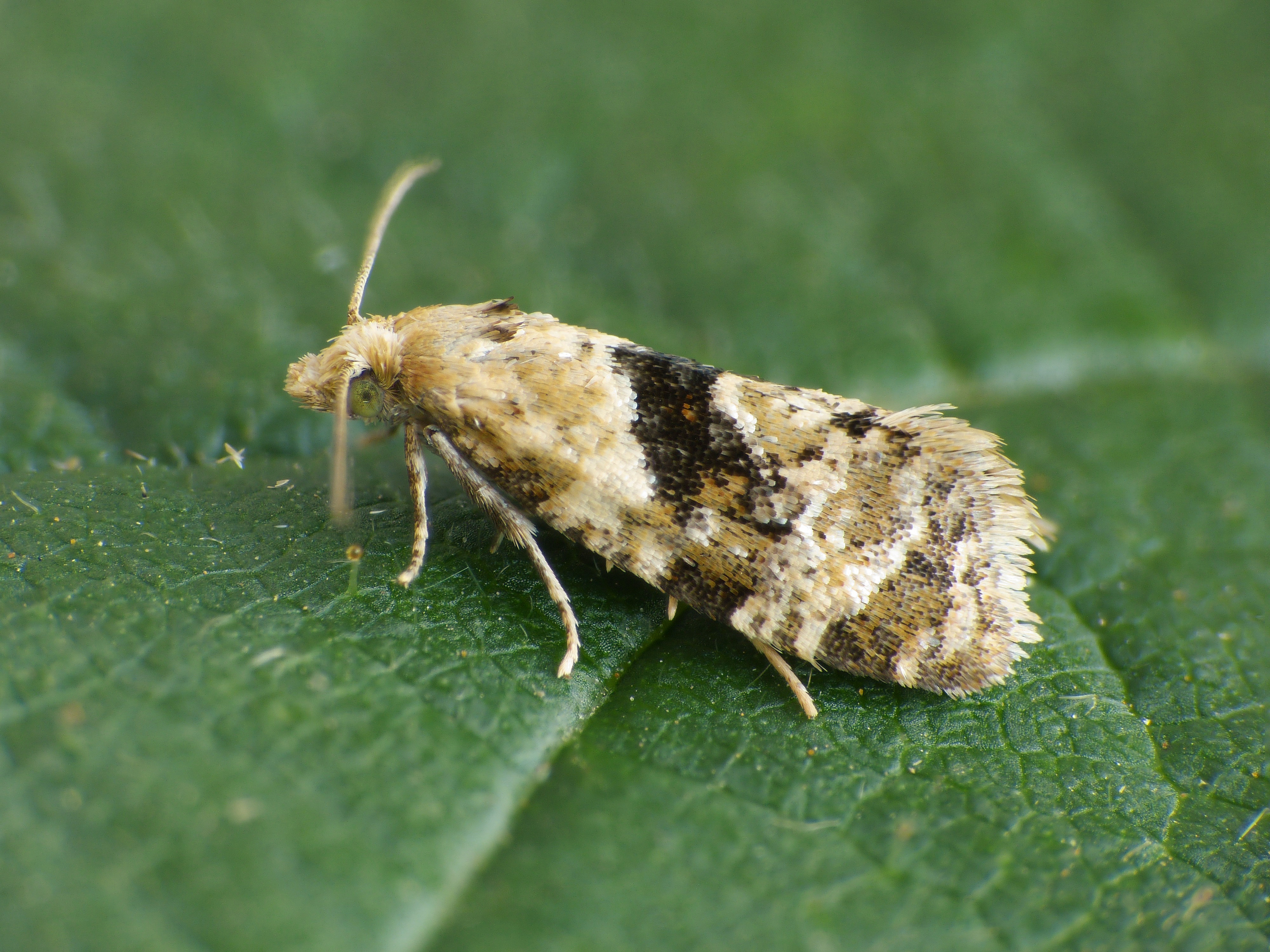

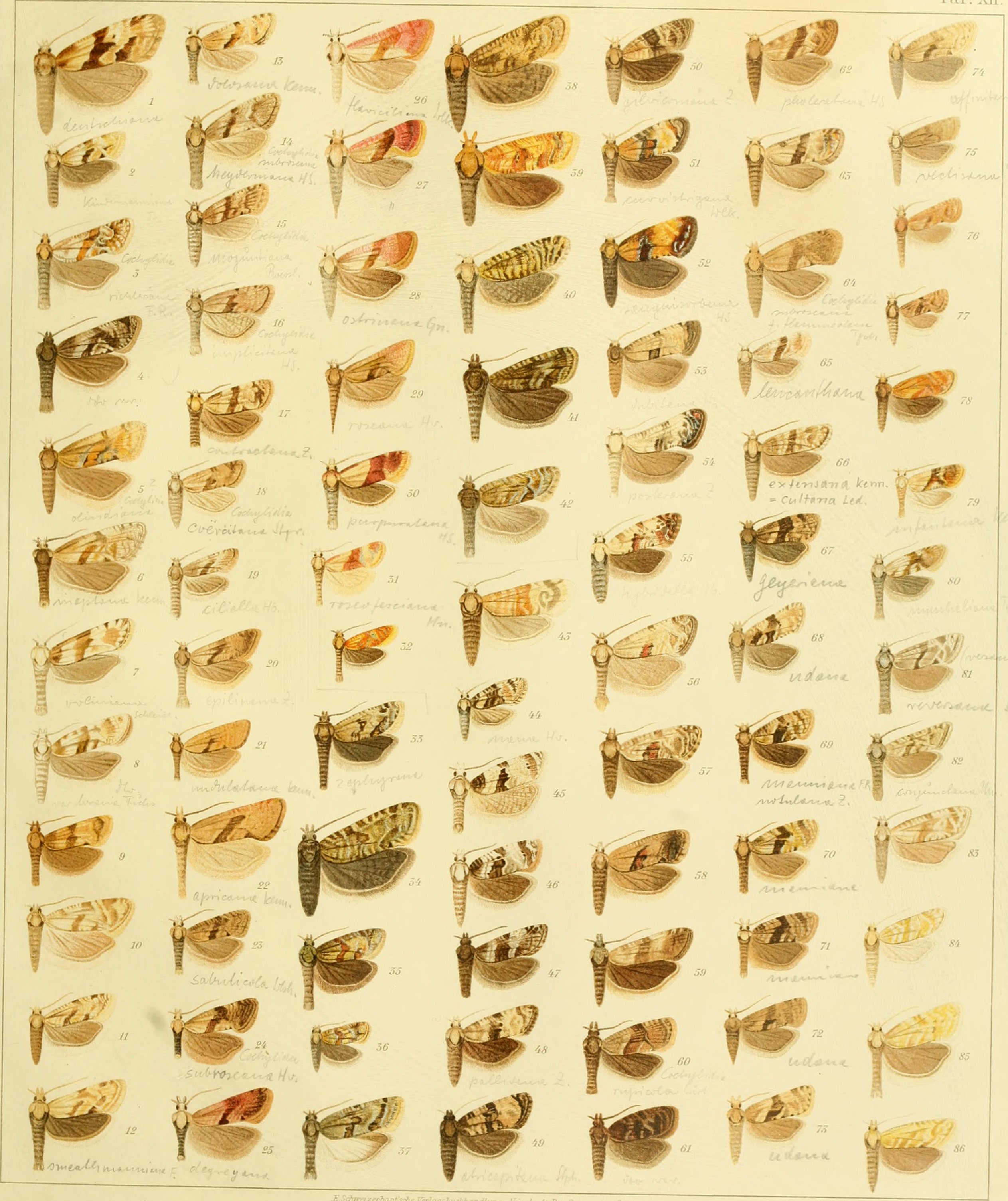
- in Kennel Die palaearktischen tortriciden figures 69 -73

Scientific classification
- Domain: Eukaryota
- Kingdom: Animalia
- Phylum: Arthropoda
- Class: Insecta
- Order: Lepidoptera
- Family: Tortricidae
- Genus: Phalonidia
- Species: P. manniana

Binomial name
- Phalonidia manniana (Fischer von Röslerstamm, 1839)

Synonyms
- Cochylis notulana Zeller, 1847; Phalonidia tolli Razowski, 1960; Cochylis udana Guenée, 1845

= Phalonidia manniana =

Species of moth

Phalonidia manniana is a moth of the family Tortricidae. It is found in most of Europe.

The wingspan is 10–13 mm. The head is white, its sides ochreous-brown. The forewings have moderately arched costa. The forewing ground colour is whitish-ochreous, its margins strigulated with brown. There is a suffusion along the base of the costa, an oblique streak from dorsum near the base and a median fascia angulated above middle. There is a fascia-like spot from costa posteriorly which does not reach the termen, and indistinct suffusions before and above the tornus All are deep ochreous, sometimes brown-sprinkled. The hindwings are pale grey.

Adults are on wing from June to August depending on the location.

Larvae have been recorded on Mentha piperita, Mentha aquatica, Mentha longifolia, Alisma plantago-aquatica, Butomus, Lycopus and Inula.
