= Phalonidia claudia =

Scientific classification
- Domain: Eukaryota
- Kingdom: Animalia
- Phylum: Arthropoda
- Class: Insecta
- Order: Lepidoptera
- Family: Tortricidae
- Genus: Phalonidia
- Species: P. claudia

Binomial name
- Phalonidia claudia Razowski & Wojtusiak, 2006

Species of moth

Phalonidia claudia is a species of moth of the family Tortricidae. It is found in Venezuela.

The wingspan is about 26 mm.
