= Phalonidia amasiana =

Scientific classification
- Domain: Eukaryota
- Kingdom: Animalia
- Phylum: Arthropoda
- Class: Insecta
- Order: Lepidoptera
- Family: Tortricidae
- Genus: Phalonidia
- Species: P. amasiana

Binomial name
- Phalonidia amasiana (Ragonot, 1894)

Synonyms
- Conchylis amasiana Ragonot, 1894; Phtheochroa amasiana

Species of moth

Phalonidia amasiana is a species of moth of the family Tortricidae. It is found in Turkey and Ukraine.
