= Phalonidia brilhanteana =

Scientific classification
- Kingdom: Animalia
- Phylum: Arthropoda
- Clade: Pancrustacea
- Class: Insecta
- Order: Lepidoptera
- Family: Tortricidae
- Genus: Phalonidia
- Species: P. brilhanteana

Binomial name
- Phalonidia brilhanteana (Razowski & Becker, 1983)

Synonyms
- Saphenista brilhanteana Razowski & Becker, 1983

Species of moth

Phalonidia brilhanteana is a species of moth of the family Tortricidae. It is found in Mato Grosso, Brazil.
