= Phalonidia dubia =

Scientific classification
- Kingdom: Animalia
- Phylum: Arthropoda
- Clade: Pancrustacea
- Class: Insecta
- Order: Lepidoptera
- Family: Tortricidae
- Genus: Phalonidia
- Species: P. dubia

Binomial name
- Phalonidia dubia (Razowski & Becker, 1983)

Synonyms
- Saphenista dubia Razowski & Becker, 1983; Platphalonidia dubia

Species of moth

Phalonidia dubia is a species of moth of the family Tortricidae. It is found in Mato Grosso, Brazil.
