= Terinebrica achrostos =

Scientific classification
- Kingdom: Animalia
- Phylum: Arthropoda
- Clade: Pancrustacea
- Class: Insecta
- Order: Lepidoptera
- Family: Tortricidae
- Genus: Terinebrica
- Species: T. achrostos

Binomial name
- Terinebrica achrostos Razowski & Becker, 2001

Species of moth

Terinebrica achrostos is a moth of the family Tortricidae. The species was first described by Józef Razowski and Vitor O. Becker in 2001. Its type locality is in Paraná, Brazil.
