= Phalonidia campicolana =

Scientific classification
- Domain: Eukaryota
- Kingdom: Animalia
- Phylum: Arthropoda
- Class: Insecta
- Order: Lepidoptera
- Family: Tortricidae
- Genus: Phalonidia
- Species: P. campicolana

Binomial name
- Phalonidia campicolana (Walsingham, 1879)

Synonyms
- Cochylis campicolana Walsingham, 1879; Platphalonidia campicolana; Saphenista campicolana

Species of moth

Phalonidia campicolana is a species of moth of the family Tortricidae. It is found in the United States, where it has been recorded from California, Washington, Maine and Minnesota.

The length of the forewings ranges 6.5–8 mm. Adults have been recorded on the wing from May to July.
