= Phalonidia chlorolitha =

Scientific classification
- Kingdom: Animalia
- Phylum: Arthropoda
- Class: Insecta
- Order: Lepidoptera
- Family: Tortricidae
- Genus: Phalonidia
- Species: P. chlorolitha

Binomial name
- Phalonidia chlorolitha (Meyrick, 1931)

Synonyms
- Phalonia chlorolitha Meyrick, 1931; Phalonia azyga Meyrick, in Caradja & Meyrick, 1935

Species of moth

Phalonidia chlorolitha is a species of moth of the family Tortricidae. It is found in China (Gansu, Hebei, Heilongjiang, Henan, Hubei, Jilin, Liaoning, Ningxia, Shanxi, Sichuan, Zhejiang), Japan, Korea and Russia.

The wingspan is 15−19 mm.
