= Phalonidia galbanea =

Scientific classification
- Kingdom: Animalia
- Phylum: Arthropoda
- Class: Insecta
- Order: Lepidoptera
- Family: Tortricidae
- Genus: Phalonidia
- Species: P. galbanea

Binomial name
- Phalonidia galbanea (Meyrick, 1917)

Synonyms
- Phalonia galbanea Meyrick, 1917; Platphalonidia galbanea

Species of moth

Phalonidia galbanea is a species of moth of the family Tortricidae. It is found in Guyana.
