= Terinebrica seiugata =

Scientific classification
- Kingdom: Animalia
- Phylum: Arthropoda
- Class: Insecta
- Order: Lepidoptera
- Family: Tortricidae
- Genus: Terinebrica
- Species: T. seiugata

Binomial name
- Terinebrica seiugata Razowski, 1987

Species of moth

Terinebrica seiugata is a species of moth of the family Tortricidae. It is found in Peru.
