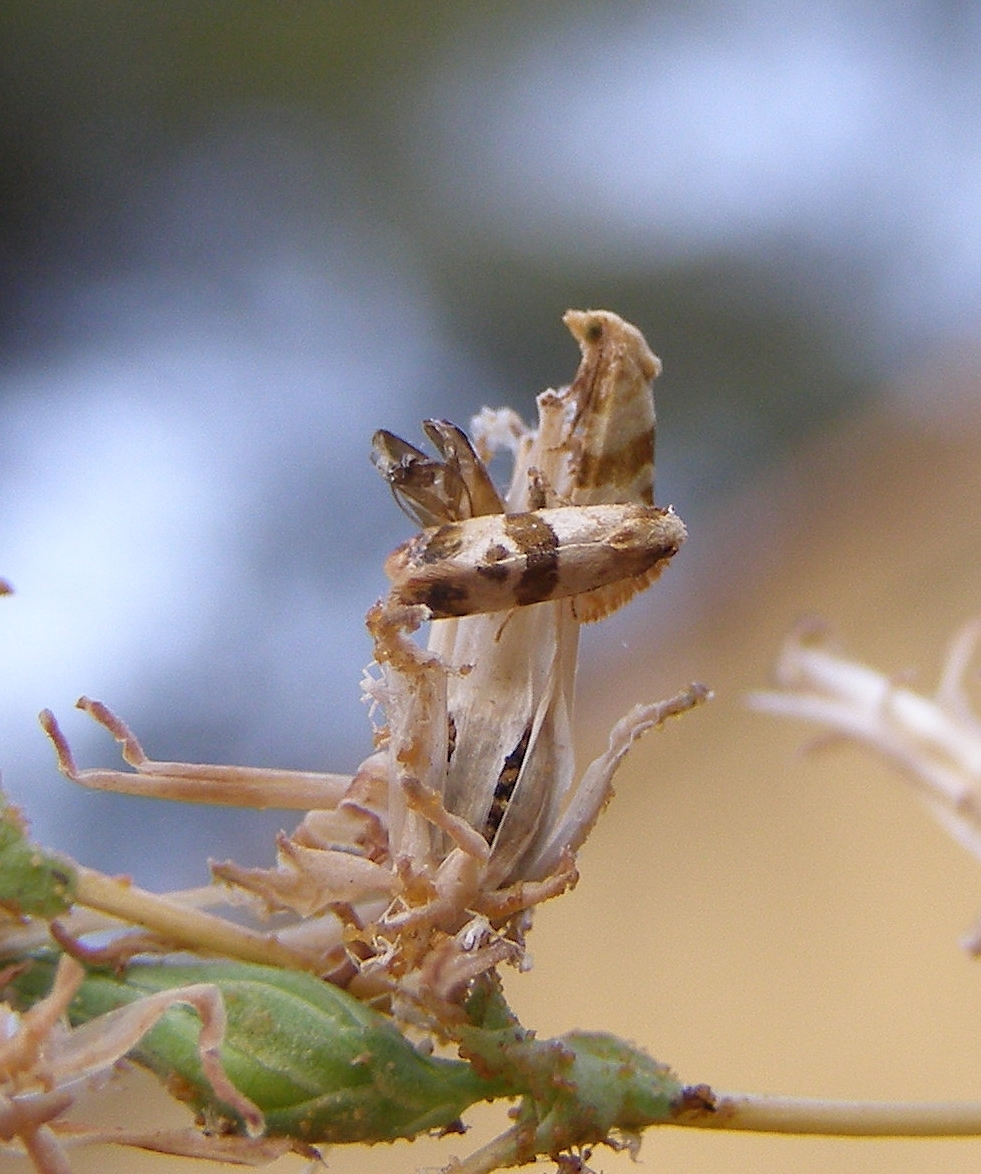

Scientific classification
- Kingdom: Animalia
- Phylum: Arthropoda
- Clade: Pancrustacea
- Class: Insecta
- Order: Lepidoptera
- Family: Tortricidae
- Genus: Phalonidia
- Species: P. contractana

Binomial name
- Phalonidia contractana (Zeller, 1847)

Synonyms
- Phalonia exaequata Meyrick, 1923; Conchylis manifestana Kennel, 1901; Phalonia thermoconis Meyrick, 1925; Cochylis contractana Zeller, 1847

= Phalonidia contractana =

Species of moth

Phalonidia contractana is a moth of the family Tortricidae. It is found in southern Europe (including Spain, southern France and Italy), Dalmatia, Macedonia, Hungary, Romania, Bulgaria, Greece, Ukraine, southern Russia (Sarepta), Uralsk, Turkey, Kuldscha, Afghanistan, Kashmir, Lebanon, China (Henan, Xinjiang), Iran, Pakistan and Kyrgyzstan.

The wingspan is 12−14 mm.

Larvae have been recorded on Artemisia, Anthemis, Cichorium, Lactuca, Inula viscose and Inula graveolens.
