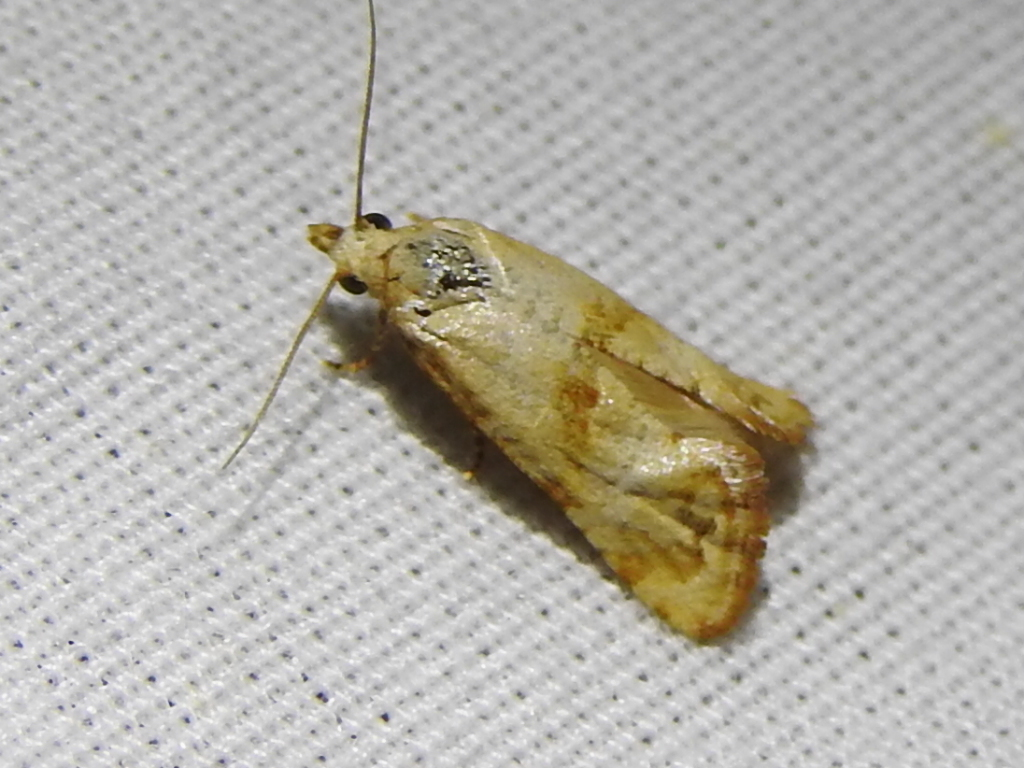
- Platphalonidia felix, Texas

Scientific classification
- Domain: Eukaryota
- Kingdom: Animalia
- Phylum: Arthropoda
- Class: Insecta
- Order: Lepidoptera
- Family: Tortricidae
- Genus: Phalonidia
- Species: P. felix

Binomial name
- Phalonidia felix (Walsingham, 1895)

Synonyms
- Phalonia felix Walsingham, 1895; Platphalonidia felix

= Phalonidia felix =

Species of moth

Phalonidia felix is a species of moth of the family Tortricidae. It is found in North America, where it has been recorded from Alberta, Arizona, California, Colorado, Florida, Maryland, New Mexico, Oklahoma, Ontario, Tennessee, Texas and Virginia.

The length of the forewings is 6.5–9 mm. Adults have been recorded on wing from February to October.

The larvae feed on Senecio flaccidus andSenecio blochmaniae, but have also been reared on Artemisia species.
