= Phalonidia meizobursa =

Scientific classification
- Kingdom: Animalia
- Phylum: Arthropoda
- Clade: Pancrustacea
- Class: Insecta
- Order: Lepidoptera
- Family: Tortricidae
- Genus: Phalonidia
- Species: P. meizobursa

Binomial name
- Phalonidia meizobursa Razowski & Becker, 1994

Species of moth

Phalonidia meizobursa is a species of moth of the family Tortricidae. It is found in Minas Gerais, Brazil.
