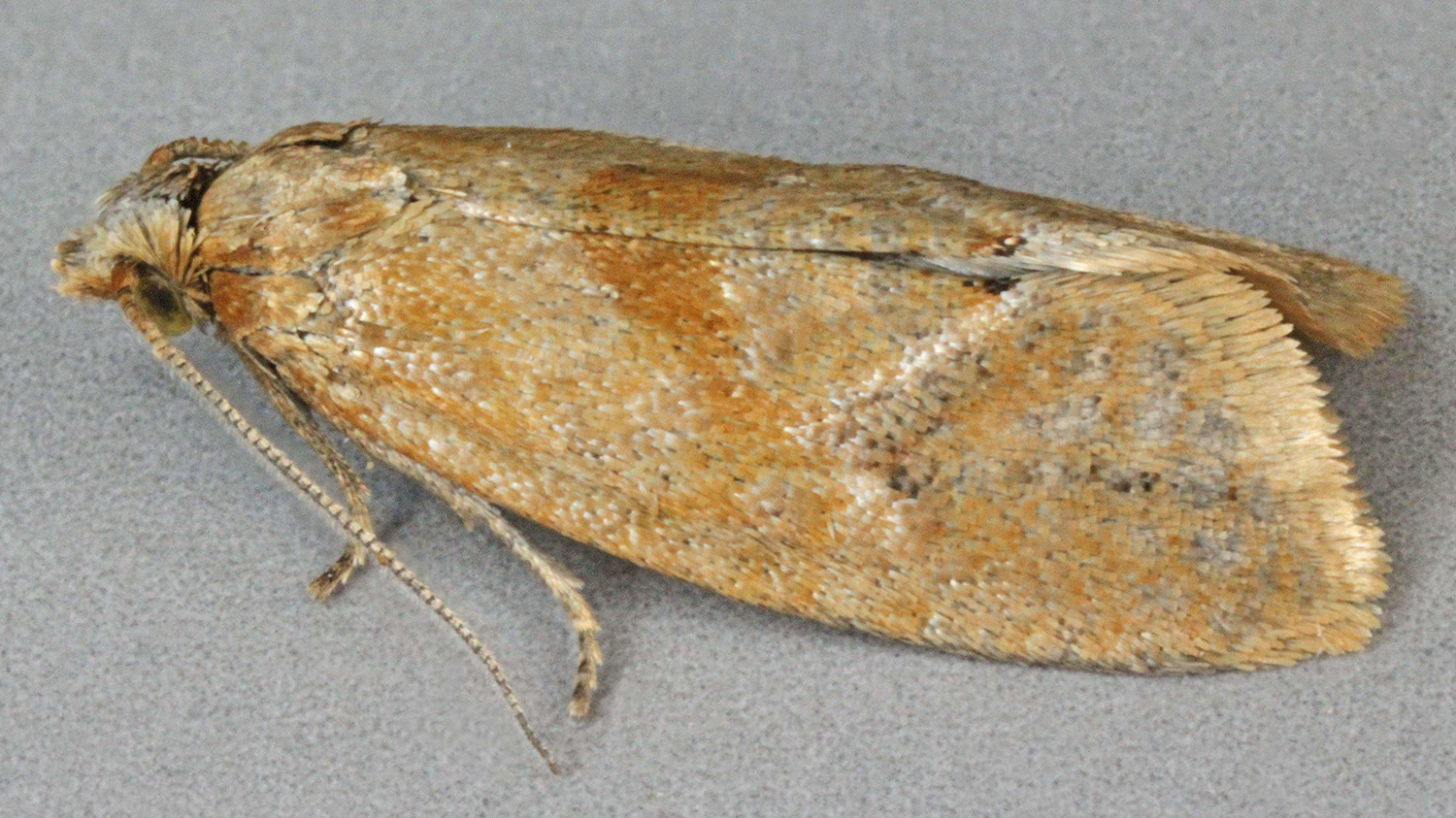
- Phalonidia affinitana, Dyffryn, North Wales, August 2012

Scientific classification
- Kingdom: Animalia
- Phylum: Arthropoda
- Clade: Pancrustacea
- Class: Insecta
- Order: Lepidoptera
- Family: Tortricidae
- Genus: Phalonidia
- Species: P. affinitana

Binomial name
- Phalonidia affinitana (Douglas, 1846)

Synonyms
- Cochylis affinitana Douglas, 1846; Cochylis cancellana Zeller, 1847; Cochylis inulana Constant, 1884; Cochylis tauriana Kennel, 1899; Conchylis affinitana ab. moravica Zimmerman, 1926; Conchylis littorana Galvagni, 1906; Phalonia affinitana Meyrick, 1895

= Phalonidia affinitana =

Species of moth

Phalonidia affinitana, the large saltmarsh conch or large saltmarsh bell, is a species of moth of the family Tortricidae, the subfamily Tortricinae, and the tribe Cochylini. It is found in China (Liaoning, Tianjin, Xinjiang), Japan, Korea, Russia and most of Europe. Its habitat consists of salt marshes.

Adults are on wing from June to August in western Europe. The larvae feed on the flowers of Aster tripolium.

== Description ==
The wingspan is 11–14 mm. The forewings are elongate and the costa gently arched. The ground colour is light brownish-ochreous, submetallic and strigulated with fuscous. There is a slender straight brownish antemedian fascia parallel to the termen and interrupted beneath the costa and a dark fuscous dorsal dot or small spot before the tornus. The hindwings are grey. The larva is whitish, dorsally greyish - tinged; spiracular line faint, grey; head brown; plate of 2 black.

For a key to the terms used, see Glossary of entomology terms.

== Similar species ==
=== Subspecies ===
- Phalonidia affinitana affinitana
- Phalonidia affinitana tauriana (Kennel, 1899)
