= Phalonidia rufoatra =

Scientific classification
- Kingdom: Animalia
- Phylum: Arthropoda
- Class: Insecta
- Order: Lepidoptera
- Family: Tortricidae
- Genus: Phalonidia
- Species: P. rufoatra

Binomial name
- Phalonidia rufoatra Razowski, 1992

Species of moth

Phalonidia rufoatra is a species of moth of the family Tortricidae. It is found in Costa Rica.

The wingspan is about 10 mm.
