= Terinebrica orthoscia =

Scientific classification
- Kingdom: Animalia
- Phylum: Arthropoda
- Class: Insecta
- Order: Lepidoptera
- Family: Tortricidae
- Genus: Terinebrica
- Species: T. orthoscia

Binomial name
- Terinebrica orthoscia (Meyrick, 1936)

Synonyms
- Eulia orthoscia Meyrick, 1936

Species of moth

Terinebrica orthoscia is a species of moth of the family Tortricidae. It is found in Venezuela.
