= Phalonidia holguina =

Scientific classification
- Kingdom: Animalia
- Phylum: Arthropoda
- Clade: Pancrustacea
- Class: Insecta
- Order: Lepidoptera
- Family: Tortricidae
- Genus: Phalonidia
- Species: P. holguina

Binomial name
- Phalonidia holguina (Razowski & Becker, 2007)

Synonyms
- Platphalonidia holguina Razowski & Becker, 2007

Species of moth

Phalonidia holguina is a species of moth of the family Tortricidae. It is found on Cuba.

The wingspan is about 7 mm.

== Etymology ==
The species name refers to Holguín, the type locality.
