= Phalonidia cholovalva =

Scientific classification
- Domain: Eukaryota
- Kingdom: Animalia
- Phylum: Arthropoda
- Class: Insecta
- Order: Lepidoptera
- Family: Tortricidae
- Genus: Phalonidia
- Species: P. cholovalva

Binomial name
- Phalonidia cholovalva Razowski & Wojtusiak, 2006

Species of moth

Phalonidia cholovalva is a species of moth of the family Tortricidae. It is found in Venezuela.

The wingspan is about 35 mm.

== Etymology ==
The species name refers to the asymmetry of the sacculus and is derived from Greek cholo (meaning lame).
