= Phalonidia imitabilis =

Scientific classification
- Kingdom: Animalia
- Phylum: Arthropoda
- Class: Insecta
- Order: Lepidoptera
- Family: Tortricidae
- Genus: Phalonidia
- Species: P. imitabilis

Binomial name
- Phalonidia imitabilis (Razowski, 1997)

Synonyms
- Platphalonidia imitabilis Razowski, 1997

Species of moth

Phalonidia imitabilis is a species of moth of the family Tortricidae. It is found in Canada, where it has been recorded from Alberta.
