= Terinebrica cornicenthes =

Scientific classification
- Kingdom: Animalia
- Phylum: Arthropoda
- Clade: Pancrustacea
- Class: Insecta
- Order: Lepidoptera
- Family: Tortricidae
- Genus: Terinebrica
- Species: T. cornicenthes

Binomial name
- Terinebrica cornicenthes Razowski & Becker, 2001

Species of moth

Terinebrica cornicenthes is a species of moth of the family Tortricidae. It is found in Paraná, Brazil.
