= Mourecochylis ramosa =

Scientific classification
- Kingdom: Animalia
- Phylum: Arthropoda
- Clade: Pancrustacea
- Class: Insecta
- Order: Lepidoptera
- Family: Tortricidae
- Genus: Mourecochylis
- Species: M. ramosa

Binomial name
- Mourecochylis ramosa Razowski & Becker, 1983

Species of moth

Mourecochylis ramosa is a species of moth of the family Tortricidae. It is found in Paraná, Brazil.
