= Phalonidia haplidia =

Scientific classification
- Kingdom: Animalia
- Phylum: Arthropoda
- Class: Insecta
- Order: Lepidoptera
- Family: Tortricidae
- Genus: Phalonidia
- Species: P. haplidia

Binomial name
- Phalonidia haplidia (Razowski, 1986)

Synonyms
- Phtheochroa haplidia Razowski, 1986; Platphalonidia haplidia

Species of moth

Phalonidia haplidia is a species of moth of the family Tortricidae. It is found in Durango, Mexico.
