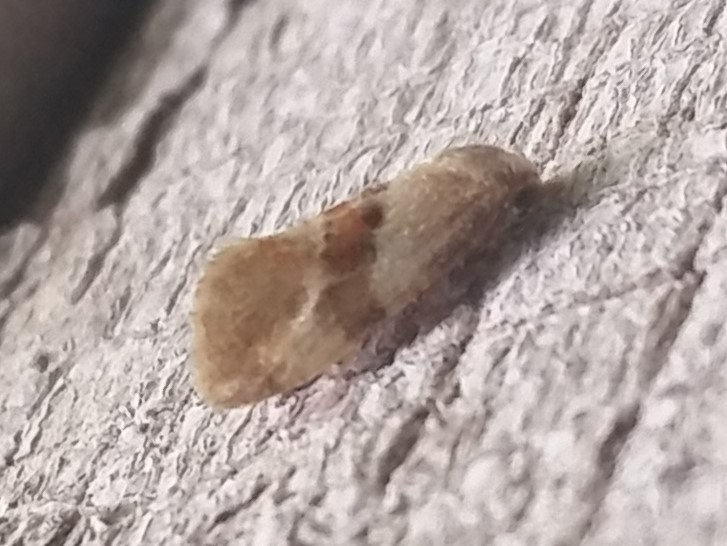

Scientific classification
- Kingdom: Animalia
- Phylum: Arthropoda
- Clade: Pancrustacea
- Class: Insecta
- Order: Lepidoptera
- Family: Tortricidae
- Genus: Phalonidia
- Species: P. lepidana

Binomial name
- Phalonidia lepidana (Clemens, 1860)

Synonyms
- Argyrolepia lepidana Clemens, 1860; Phalonia plummeriana Busck, 1907; Phalonia schwarziana Busck, 1907; Conchylis straminoides Grote, 1873; Phalonia zaracana Kearfott, 1907

= Phalonidia lepidana =

Species of moth

Phalonidia lepidana is a species of moth of the family Tortricidae. It is found in eastern North America, where it has been recorded from Illinois, Indiana, Iowa, Kentucky, Maine, Massachusetts, Minnesota, North Carolina, Ohio, Ontario, Pennsylvania, Quebec, Tennessee and Wisconsin.

The wingspan is 12–13 mm. Adults have been recorded on wing from May to August.
