= Phalonidia phlebotoma =

Scientific classification
- Kingdom: Animalia
- Phylum: Arthropoda
- Clade: Pancrustacea
- Class: Insecta
- Order: Lepidoptera
- Family: Tortricidae
- Genus: Phalonidia
- Species: P. phlebotoma

Binomial name
- Phalonidia phlebotoma Razowski & Becker, 1994

Species of moth

Phalonidia phlebotoma is a species of moth of the family Tortricidae. It is found in Pará, Brazil.
