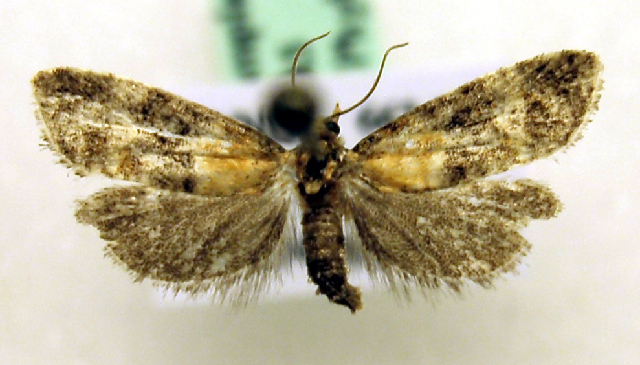

Scientific classification
- Kingdom: Animalia
- Phylum: Arthropoda
- Clade: Pancrustacea
- Class: Insecta
- Order: Lepidoptera
- Family: Tortricidae
- Genus: Phalonidia
- Species: P. gilvicomana

Binomial name
- Phalonidia gilvicomana (Zeller, 1847)

Synonyms
- Cochylis gilvicomana Zeller, 1847; Gynnidomorpha gilvicomana; Tortrix flaviscapulana Herrich-Schaffer, 1847; Tortrix (Coccyx) flaviscapulana Herrich-Schaffer, 1851; Coccyx flavoscapulana Herrich-Schaffer, 1856

= Phalonidia gilvicomana =

Species of moth

Phalonidia gilvicomana, the wall-lettuce conch, is a species of moth of the family Tortricidae. It is found in most of Europe. The habitat consists of woodlands, downlands and waste grounds.

The wingspan is 11−14 mm. Adults are on wing from June to August.

The larvae feed on Lapsana communis, Chenopodium species, Prenanthes purpurea and Mycelis muralis. They live in the seed heads and feed on the seeds of their host plant.
