= Phalonidia synucha =

Scientific classification
- Kingdom: Animalia
- Phylum: Arthropoda
- Clade: Pancrustacea
- Class: Insecta
- Order: Lepidoptera
- Family: Tortricidae
- Genus: Phalonidia
- Species: P. synucha

Binomial name
- Phalonidia synucha Razowski & Becker, 1986

Species of moth

Phalonidia synucha is a species of moth of the family Tortricidae. It is found in Costa Rica.
