= Phalonidia olivogrisea =

Scientific classification
- Domain: Eukaryota
- Kingdom: Animalia
- Phylum: Arthropoda
- Class: Insecta
- Order: Lepidoptera
- Family: Tortricidae
- Genus: Phalonidia
- Species: P. olivogrisea

Binomial name
- Phalonidia olivogrisea Razowski & Wojtusiak, 2010

Species of moth

Phalonidia olivogrisea is a species of moth of the family Tortricidae. It is found in Peru.

The wingspan is about 27 mm.
