= Razowskiina ptilota =

Scientific classification
- Kingdom: Animalia
- Phylum: Arthropoda
- Clade: Pancrustacea
- Class: Insecta
- Order: Lepidoptera
- Family: Tortricidae
- Genus: Razowskiina
- Species: R. ptilota

Binomial name
- Razowskiina ptilota (Razowski & Becker, 1991)

Synonyms
- Silenis ptilota Razowski & Becker, 1991

Species of moth

Razowskiina ptilota is a species of moth of the family Tortricidae. It is found in Paraná, Brazil.
