= Phalonidia chlaenites =

Scientific classification
- Kingdom: Animalia
- Phylum: Arthropoda
- Clade: Pancrustacea
- Class: Insecta
- Order: Lepidoptera
- Family: Tortricidae
- Genus: Phalonidia
- Species: P. chlaenites

Binomial name
- Phalonidia chlaenites Razowski & Becker, 2002

Species of moth

Phalonidia chlaenites is a species of moth of the family Tortricidae. It is found in Minas Gerais, Brazil.

The wingspan is about 9 mm.
