= Phalonidia nicotiana =

Scientific classification
- Domain: Eukaryota
- Kingdom: Animalia
- Phylum: Arthropoda
- Class: Insecta
- Order: Lepidoptera
- Family: Tortricidae
- Genus: Phalonidia
- Species: P. nicotiana

Binomial name
- Phalonidia nicotiana Liu & Ge, 1991

Species of moth

Phalonidia nicotiana is a species of moth of the family Tortricidae. It is found in China in the provinces of Heilongjiang and Liaoning.

The wingspan is about 12 mm.
