= Phalonidia silvestris =

Scientific classification
- Domain: Eukaryota
- Kingdom: Animalia
- Phylum: Arthropoda
- Class: Insecta
- Order: Lepidoptera
- Family: Tortricidae
- Genus: Phalonidia
- Species: P. silvestris

Binomial name
- Phalonidia silvestris Kuznetzov, 1966

Species of moth

Phalonidia silvestris is a species of moth of the family Tortricidae. It is found in China (Gansu, Heilongjiang, Henan, Hunan, Liaoning, Ningxia), Japan, Korea, Mongolia and Russia.

The wingspan is 14−16 mm.
