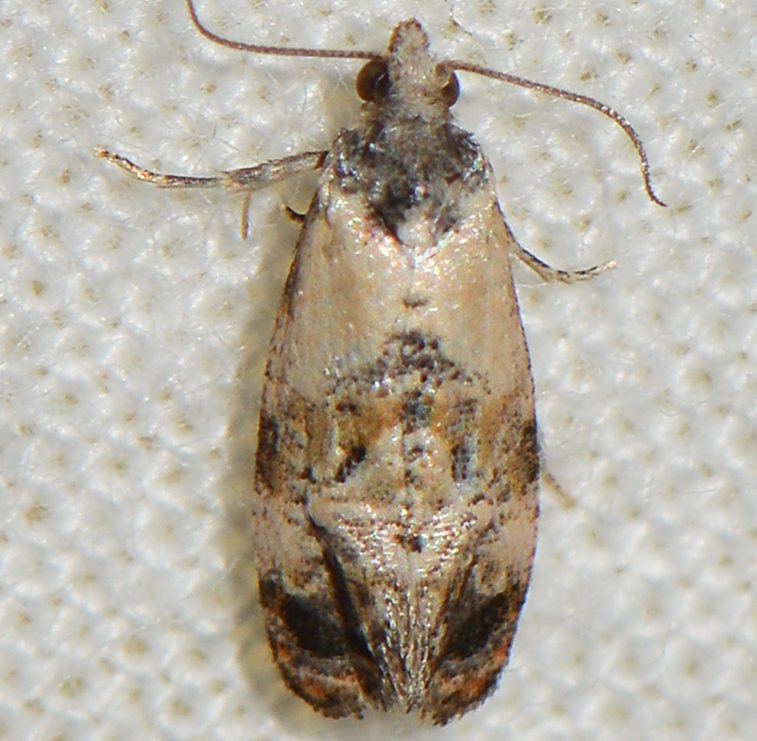

Scientific classification
- Kingdom: Animalia
- Phylum: Arthropoda
- Class: Insecta
- Order: Lepidoptera
- Family: Tortricidae
- Genus: Phalonidia
- Species: P. memoranda

Binomial name
- Phalonidia memoranda Razowski, 1997

= Phalonidia memoranda =

Species of moth

Phalonidia memoranda is a species of moth of the family Tortricidae. It is found in North America, where it has been recorded from Ontario, Connecticut, Indiana, Maryland, Massachusetts, Quebec and Vermont.

The wingspan is about 11 mm. Adults have been recorded on wing in May and July.
