= Phalonidia lydiae =

Scientific classification
- Domain: Eukaryota
- Kingdom: Animalia
- Phylum: Arthropoda
- Class: Insecta
- Order: Lepidoptera
- Family: Tortricidae
- Genus: Phalonidia
- Species: P. lydiae

Binomial name
- Phalonidia lydiae (Filipjev, 1940)

Synonyms
- Piercea lydiae Filipjev, 1940; Phalonidia lidiae Kuznetzov, 1966; Phalonidia lyidae Byun & Park, 1995

Species of moth

Phalonidia lydiae is a species of moth of the family Tortricidae. It is found in China (Anhui, Beijing, Gansu, Guizhou, Heilongjiang, Hunan, Jilin, Liaoning, Ningxia, Yunnan), Japan, Korea and Russia.

The wingspan is 9−13 mm.
