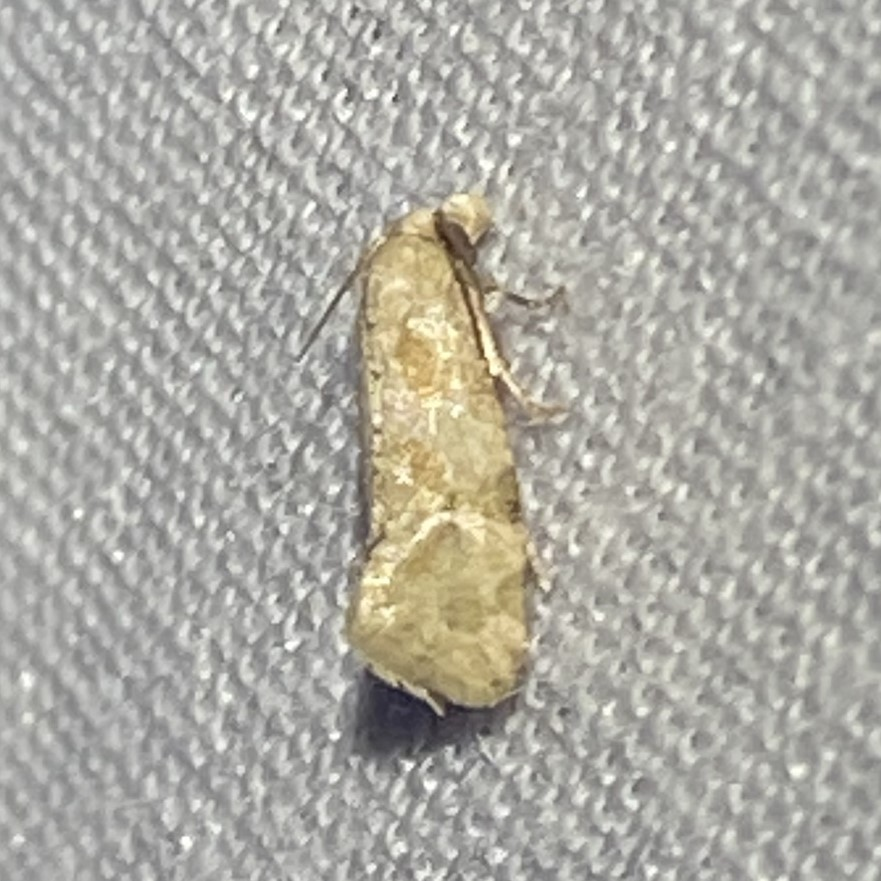

Scientific classification
- Kingdom: Animalia
- Phylum: Arthropoda
- Clade: Pancrustacea
- Class: Insecta
- Order: Lepidoptera
- Family: Tortricidae
- Genus: Phalonidia
- Species: P. subolivacea

Binomial name
- Phalonidia subolivacea (Walsingham, 1897)

Synonyms
- Phalonia subolivacea Walsingham, 1897; Phalonidia subolivacea (Walsingham, 1897)

= Platphalonidia subolivacea =

Species of moth

Platphalonidia subolivacea is a species of moth of the family Tortricidae. It is found on the Virgin Islands and Puerto Rico.
