= Phalonidia basiochreana =

Scientific classification
- Domain: Eukaryota
- Kingdom: Animalia
- Phylum: Arthropoda
- Class: Insecta
- Order: Lepidoptera
- Family: Tortricidae
- Genus: Phalonidia
- Species: P. basiochreana

Binomial name
- Phalonidia basiochreana (Kearfott, 1907)

Synonyms
- Phalonia basiochreana Kearfott, 1907

Species of moth

Phalonidia basiochreana is a species of moth of the family Tortricidae. It is found in California, United States.
