= Phalonidia jequieta =

Scientific classification
- Kingdom: Animalia
- Phylum: Arthropoda
- Clade: Pancrustacea
- Class: Insecta
- Order: Lepidoptera
- Family: Tortricidae
- Genus: Phalonidia
- Species: P. jequieta

Binomial name
- Phalonidia jequieta Razowski & Becker, 2002

Species of moth

Phalonidia jequieta is a species of moth of the family Tortricidae. It is found in Bahia, Brazil.

The wingspan is about 6 mm.
