= Sychnovalva syrrhapta =

Scientific classification
- Kingdom: Animalia
- Phylum: Arthropoda
- Class: Insecta
- Order: Lepidoptera
- Family: Tortricidae
- Genus: Sychnovalva
- Species: S. syrrhapta

Binomial name
- Sychnovalva syrrhapta Razowski, 1997

Species of moth

Sychnovalva syrrhapta is a species of moth of the family Tortricidae. It is found in Brazil in the states of Paraná and Santa Catarina.
