= Brazeulia joaquimana =

Scientific classification
- Kingdom: Animalia
- Phylum: Arthropoda
- Clade: Pancrustacea
- Class: Insecta
- Order: Lepidoptera
- Family: Tortricidae
- Genus: Brazeulia
- Species: B. joaquimana

Binomial name
- Brazeulia joaquimana Razowski & Becker, 2000

Species of moth

Brazeulia joaquimana is a species of moth of the family Tortricidae. It is found in Santa Catarina, Brazil.
