= Phalonidia unguifera =

Scientific classification
- Kingdom: Animalia
- Phylum: Arthropoda
- Class: Insecta
- Order: Lepidoptera
- Family: Tortricidae
- Genus: Phalonidia
- Species: P. unguifera

Binomial name
- Phalonidia unguifera (Razowski, 1976)

Synonyms
- Cochylis unguifera Razowski, 1976

Species of moth

Phalonidia unguifera is a species of moth of the family Tortricidae. It is found in Brazil in the states of Rio Grande do Sul, Paraná, Minas Gerais, Goias, Santa Catarina and São Paulo.
