= Phalonidia assensus =

Scientific classification
- Kingdom: Animalia
- Phylum: Arthropoda
- Class: Insecta
- Order: Lepidoptera
- Family: Tortricidae
- Genus: Phalonidia
- Species: P. assensus

Binomial name
- Phalonidia assensus Razowski, 1967

Species of moth

Phalonidia assensus is a species of moth of the family Tortricidae. It is found in São Paulo, Brazil.
