= Platphalonia mystica =

Scientific classification
- Kingdom: Animalia
- Phylum: Arthropoda
- Clade: Pancrustacea
- Class: Insecta
- Order: Lepidoptera
- Family: Tortricidae
- Genus: Platphalonia
- Species: P. mystica

Binomial name
- Platphalonia mystica (Razowski & Becker, 1983)

Synonyms
- Saphenista mystica Razowski & Becker, 1983; Phalonidia mystica; Platphalonidia mystica

Species of moth

Platphalonia mystica is a species of moth of the family Tortricidae. It is found in Minas Gerais, Brazil.
