= Mourecochylis stibeutes =

Scientific classification
- Kingdom: Animalia
- Phylum: Arthropoda
- Class: Insecta
- Order: Lepidoptera
- Family: Tortricidae
- Genus: Mourecochylis
- Species: M. stibeutes

Binomial name
- Mourecochylis stibeutes (Razowski, 1992)

Synonyms
- Platphalonidia stibeutes Razowski, 1992

Species of moth

Mourecochylis stibeutes is a species of moth of the family Tortricidae. It is found in Costa Rica.
