= Phalonidia walkerana =

Scientific classification
- Kingdom: Animalia
- Phylum: Arthropoda
- Class: Insecta
- Order: Lepidoptera
- Family: Tortricidae
- Genus: Phalonidia
- Species: P. walkerana

Binomial name
- Phalonidia walkerana Razowski, 1967

Species of moth

Phalonidia walkerana is a species of moth of the family Tortricidae. It is found in Peru.
