= Phalonidia fatua =

Scientific classification
- Kingdom: Animalia
- Phylum: Arthropoda
- Clade: Pancrustacea
- Class: Insecta
- Order: Lepidoptera
- Family: Tortricidae
- Genus: Phalonidia
- Species: P. fatua

Binomial name
- Phalonidia fatua (Razowski & Becker, 1983)

Synonyms
- Saphenista fatua Razowski & Becker, 1983

Species of moth

Phalonidia fatua is a species of moth of the family Tortricidae. It is found in Santa Catarina, Brazil.
