= Mourecochylis mimosina =

Scientific classification
- Kingdom: Animalia
- Phylum: Arthropoda
- Class: Insecta
- Order: Lepidoptera
- Family: Tortricidae
- Genus: Mourecochylis
- Species: M. mimosina

Binomial name
- Mourecochylis mimosina (Razowski, 1986)

Synonyms
- Platphalonidia mimosina Razowski, 1986

Species of moth

Mourecochylis mimosina is a species of moth of the family Tortricidae. It is found in Veracruz, Mexico.
