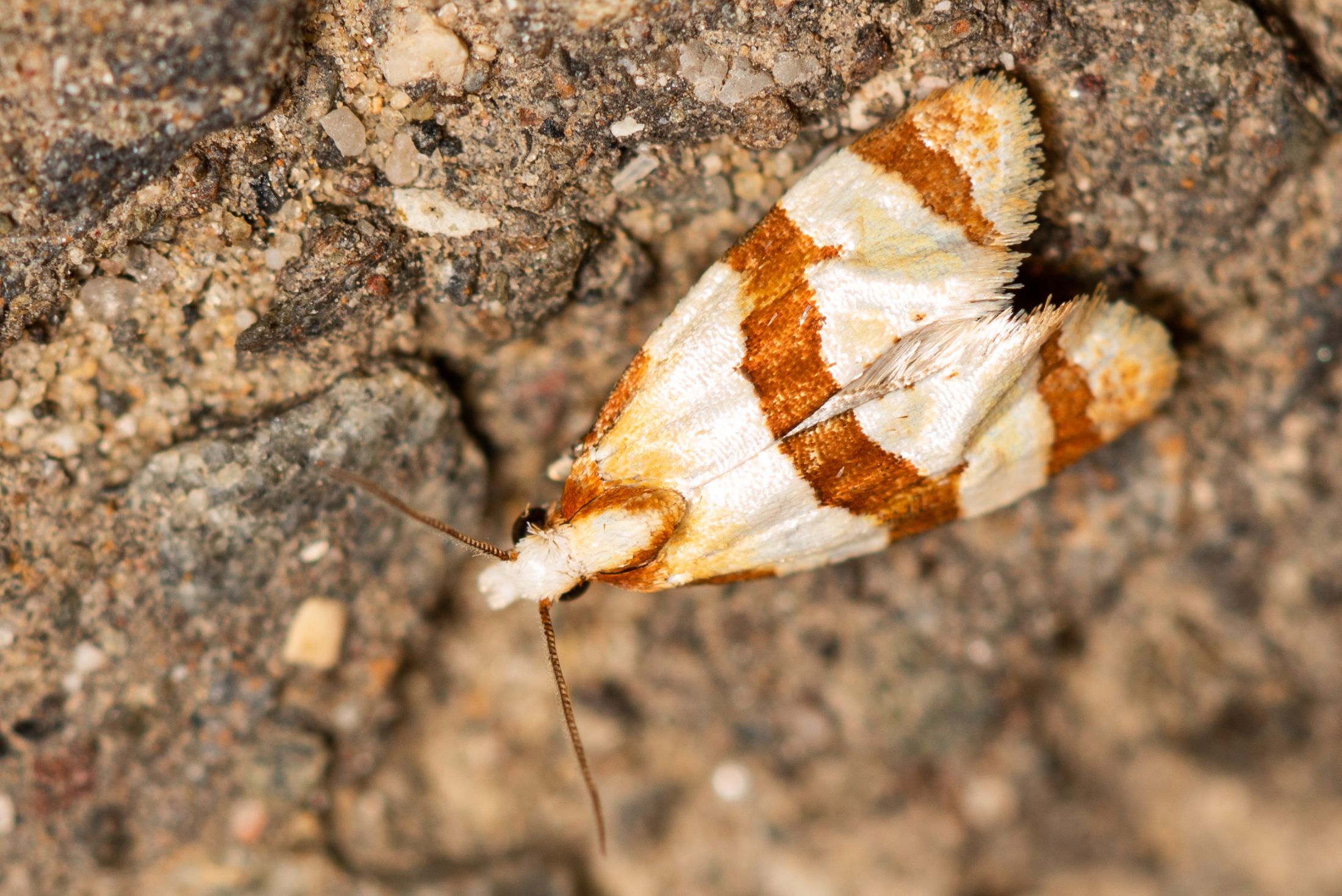

Scientific classification
- Kingdom: Animalia
- Phylum: Arthropoda
- Clade: Pancrustacea
- Class: Insecta
- Order: Lepidoptera
- Family: Tortricidae
- Genus: Phalonidia
- Species: P. albipalpana

Binomial name
- Phalonidia albipalpana (Zeller, 1847)

Synonyms
- Tortrix albipalpana Zeller, 1847; Gynnidomorpha albipalpana; Conchylis alibpalpana Caradja, 1916

= Phalonidia albipalpana =

Species of moth

Phalonidia albipalpana is a species of moth of the family Tortricidae. It is found in southern Europe, Russia (Sarepta, Uralsk, the Caucasus, Siberia), Asia Minor, the Thian Shan Mountains and Uzbekistan. The habitat consists of wooded alkaline meadows.

The wingspan is 11−15 mm. Adults are on wing from April to September. There may be two generations per year.

The larvae feed on Limonium vulgare. The species overwinters in the larval stage.

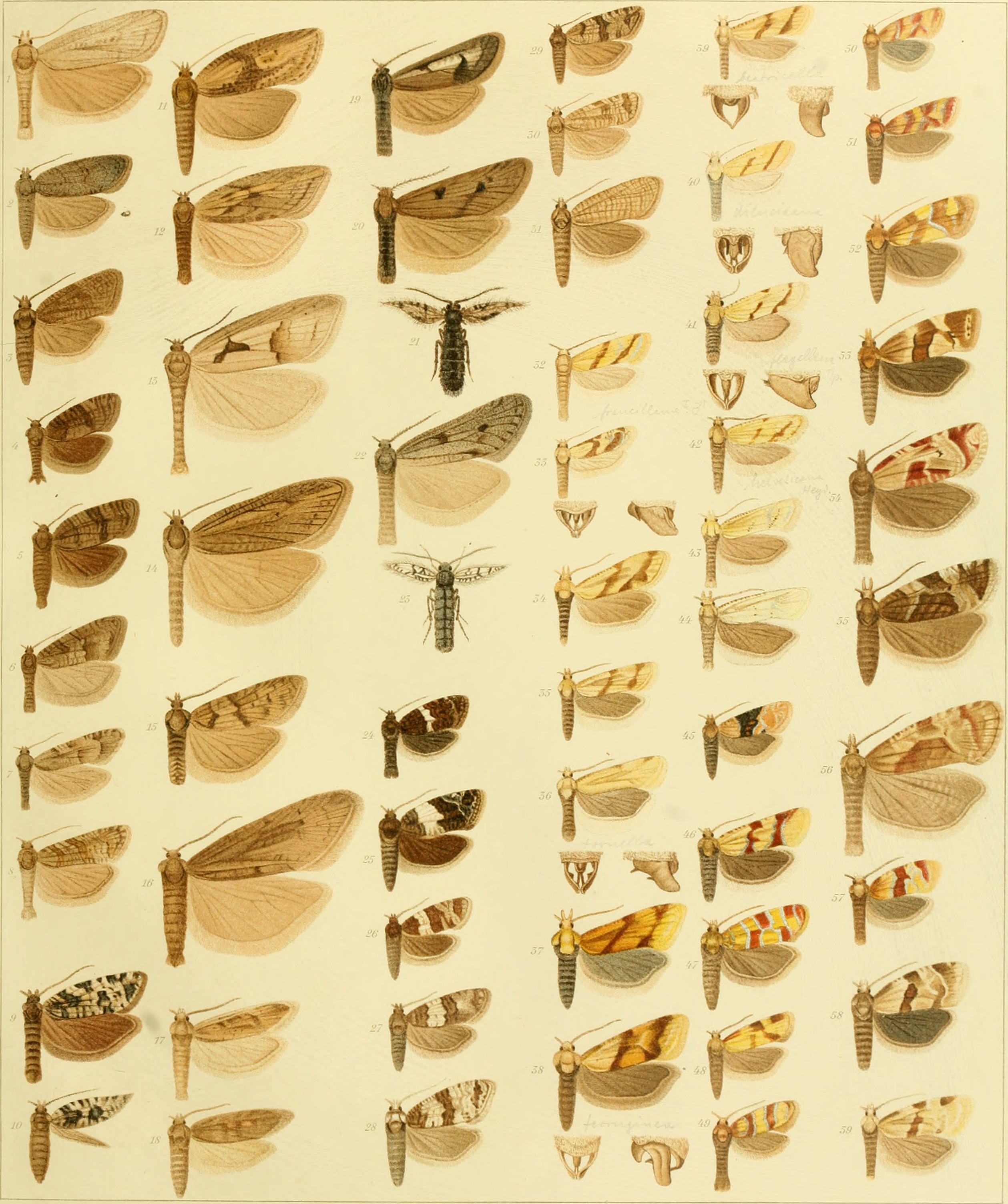
