= Phalonidia monocera =

Scientific classification
- Kingdom: Animalia
- Phylum: Arthropoda
- Clade: Pancrustacea
- Class: Insecta
- Order: Lepidoptera
- Family: Tortricidae
- Genus: Phalonidia
- Species: P. monocera

Binomial name
- Phalonidia monocera Razowski & Becker, 2007

Species of moth

Phalonidia monocera is a species of moth of the family Tortricidae. It is found in Santa Catarina, Brazil.

The wingspan is about 10 mm. In ancient Greek, μόνος (mónos) is actually used for single and κέρας (kéras) for horn.
