= Terinebrica fortifera =

Scientific classification
- Kingdom: Animalia
- Phylum: Arthropoda
- Class: Insecta
- Order: Lepidoptera
- Family: Tortricidae
- Genus: Terinebrica
- Species: T. fortifera

Binomial name
- Terinebrica fortifera Razowski, 1991

Species of moth

Terinebrica fortifera is a species of moth of the family Tortricidae. It is found in Santa Catarina, Brazil.
