= Terinebrica portentifica =

Scientific classification
- Kingdom: Animalia
- Phylum: Arthropoda
- Clade: Pancrustacea
- Class: Insecta
- Order: Lepidoptera
- Family: Tortricidae
- Genus: Terinebrica
- Species: T. portentifica

Binomial name
- Terinebrica portentifica Razowski & Becker, 2001

Species of moth

Terinebrica portentifica is a species of moth of the family Tortricidae. It is found in Brazil.

== Subspecies ==
- Terinebrica portentifica portentifica (Brazil: São Paulo)
- Terinebrica portentifica tecta Razowski & Becker, 2001 (Brazil: Santa Catarina)
