= Phalonidia horrens =

Scientific classification
- Kingdom: Animalia
- Phylum: Arthropoda
- Clade: Pancrustacea
- Class: Insecta
- Order: Lepidoptera
- Family: Tortricidae
- Genus: Phalonidia
- Species: P. horrens

Binomial name
- Phalonidia horrens (Razowski & Becker, 1983)

Synonyms
- Saphenista horrens Razowski & Becker, 1983

Species of moth

Phalonidia horrens is a species of moth of the family Tortricidae. It is found in Santa Catarina, Brazil.
