= Marylinka secunda =

Scientific classification
- Kingdom: Animalia
- Phylum: Arthropoda
- Clade: Pancrustacea
- Class: Insecta
- Order: Lepidoptera
- Family: Tortricidae
- Genus: Marylinka
- Species: M. secunda

Binomial name
- Marylinka secunda Razowski & Becker, 2007

Species of insect

Marylinka secunda is a species of moth of the family Tortricidae. It is found in Santa Catarina, Brazil.

The wingspan is about 10 mm.

== Etymology ==
The species name refers to the number of species in the genus Marylinka.
