= N. formosa =

N. formosa may refer to:

- Neopotamia formosa, an Asian moth
- Netechma formosa, a Brazilian moth
- Nilssonia formosa, a softshell turtle
