= Punctapinella conchitella =

Scientific classification
- Domain: Eukaryota
- Kingdom: Animalia
- Phylum: Arthropoda
- Class: Insecta
- Order: Lepidoptera
- Family: Tortricidae
- Genus: Punctapinella
- Species: P. conchitella

Binomial name
- Punctapinella conchitella Razowski & Wojtusiak, 2010

Species of moth

Punctapinella conchitella is a species of moth of the family Tortricidae. It is found in Peru.

The wingspan is 17.5 mm.

== Etymology ==
The species name refers to the close relationship with Punctapinella conchitis.
