= Vulpoxena separabilis =

Scientific classification
- Domain: Eukaryota
- Kingdom: Animalia
- Phylum: Arthropoda
- Class: Insecta
- Order: Lepidoptera
- Family: Tortricidae
- Genus: Vulpoxena
- Species: V. separabilis

Binomial name
- Vulpoxena separabilis Razowski & Wojtusiak, 2010

Species of moth

Vulpoxena separabilis is a species of moth of the family Tortricidae. It is found in Peru.

The wingspan is about 20 mm.
