= Rhythmologa bicuspis =

Scientific classification
- Domain: Eukaryota
- Kingdom: Animalia
- Phylum: Arthropoda
- Class: Insecta
- Order: Lepidoptera
- Family: Tortricidae
- Genus: Rhythmologa
- Species: R. bicuspis

Binomial name
- Rhythmologa bicuspis Razowski & Wojtusiak, 2010

Species of moth

Rhythmologa bicuspis is a species of moth of the family Tortricidae. It is found in Peru.

The wingspan is 22 mm.
