= Netechma paralojana =

Scientific classification
- Domain: Eukaryota
- Kingdom: Animalia
- Phylum: Arthropoda
- Class: Insecta
- Order: Lepidoptera
- Family: Tortricidae
- Genus: Netechma
- Species: N. paralojana

Binomial name
- Netechma paralojana Razowski & Wojtusiak, 2006

Species of moth

Netechma paralojana is a species of moth of the family Tortricidae. It is found in Ecuador (Morona-Santiago Province).

The wingspan is 18 millimetres (0.71 in).
