= Clarkenia triangulifera =

Scientific classification
- Domain: Eukaryota
- Kingdom: Animalia
- Phylum: Arthropoda
- Class: Insecta
- Order: Lepidoptera
- Family: Tortricidae
- Genus: Clarkenia
- Species: C. triangulifera

Binomial name
- Clarkenia triangulifera Razowski & Wojtusiak, 2008

Species of moth

Clarkenia triangulifera is a species of moth of the family Tortricidae. It is found in Pichincha Province, Ecuador.

The wingspan is 23 mm.
