= Netechma bifascia =

Scientific classification
- Domain: Eukaryota
- Kingdom: Animalia
- Phylum: Arthropoda
- Class: Insecta
- Order: Lepidoptera
- Family: Tortricidae
- Genus: Netechma
- Species: N. bifascia

Binomial name
- Netechma bifascia Razowski & Wojtusiak, 2008

Species of moth

Netechma bifascia is a species of moth of the family Tortricidae. It is found in Cotopaxi Province, Ecuador.

The wingspan is 22.5 mm.
