= Oregocerata nigrograpta =

Scientific classification
- Kingdom: Animalia
- Phylum: Arthropoda
- Class: Insecta
- Order: Lepidoptera
- Family: Tortricidae
- Genus: Oregocerata
- Species: O. nigrograpta

Binomial name
- Oregocerata nigrograpta Razowski & Wojtusiak, 2008

Species of moth

Oregocerata nigrograpta is a species of moth of the family Tortricidae. It is found in Cotopaxi Province, Ecuador.

The wingspan is 30.5 mm.
