= Punctapinella viridargentea =

Scientific classification
- Domain: Eukaryota
- Kingdom: Animalia
- Phylum: Arthropoda
- Class: Insecta
- Order: Lepidoptera
- Family: Tortricidae
- Genus: Punctapinella
- Species: P. viridargentea

Binomial name
- Punctapinella viridargentea Razowski & Wojtusiak, 2009

Species of moth

Punctapinella viridargentea is a species of moth of the family Tortricidae. It is found in Tungurahua Province, Ecuador.

The wingspan is 19.5 mm.
