= Netechma polycornuta =

Scientific classification
- Domain: Eukaryota
- Kingdom: Animalia
- Phylum: Arthropoda
- Class: Insecta
- Order: Lepidoptera
- Family: Tortricidae
- Genus: Netechma
- Species: N. polycornuta

Binomial name
- Netechma polycornuta Razowski & Wojtusiak, 2008

Species of moth

Netechma polycornuta is a species of moth of the family Tortricidae. It is found in Pichincha Province, Ecuador.

The wingspan is 18 mm.
