= Galomecalpa minutuncus =

Scientific classification
- Domain: Eukaryota
- Kingdom: Animalia
- Phylum: Arthropoda
- Class: Insecta
- Order: Lepidoptera
- Family: Tortricidae
- Genus: Galomecalpa
- Species: G. minutuncus

Binomial name
- Galomecalpa minutuncus Razowski & Wojtusiak, 2008

Species of moth

Galomecalpa minutuncus is a species of moth of the family Tortricidae. It is found in Zamora-Chinchipe Province, Ecuador.

The wingspan is 18 mm.
