= Netechma crucifera =

Scientific classification
- Domain: Eukaryota
- Kingdom: Animalia
- Phylum: Arthropoda
- Class: Insecta
- Order: Lepidoptera
- Family: Tortricidae
- Genus: Netechma
- Species: N. crucifera

Binomial name
- Netechma crucifera Razowski & Wojtusiak, 2008

Species of moth

Netechma crucifera is a species of moth of the family Tortricidae. It is found in Carchi Province, Ecuador.

The wingspan is 21 mm.
