= Ernocornutia gualaceoana =

Scientific classification
- Kingdom: Animalia
- Phylum: Arthropoda
- Clade: Pancrustacea
- Class: Insecta
- Order: Lepidoptera
- Family: Tortricidae
- Genus: Ernocornutia
- Species: E. gualaceoana

Binomial name
- Ernocornutia gualaceoana Razowski & Wojtusiak, 2006

Species of moth

Ernocornutia gualaceoana is a species of moth of the family Tortricidae. It is found in Ecuador (Morona-Santiago Province).
