= Oregocerata medioloba =

Scientific classification
- Domain: Eukaryota
- Kingdom: Animalia
- Phylum: Arthropoda
- Class: Insecta
- Order: Lepidoptera
- Family: Tortricidae
- Genus: Oregocerata
- Species: O. medioloba

Binomial name
- Oregocerata medioloba Razowski & Wojtusiak, 2008

Species of moth

Oregocerata medioloba is a species of moth of the family Tortricidae. It is found in Zamora-Chinchipe Province, Ecuador.

The wingspan is 23 mm.
