= Netechma cajanumae =

Scientific classification
- Domain: Eukaryota
- Kingdom: Animalia
- Phylum: Arthropoda
- Class: Insecta
- Order: Lepidoptera
- Family: Tortricidae
- Genus: Netechma
- Species: N. cajanumae

Binomial name
- Netechma cajanumae Razowski & Wojtusiak, 2008

Species of moth

Netechma cajanumae is a species of moth of the family Tortricidae. It is found in Loja Province, Ecuador.

The wingspan is 16 mm.
