= Netechma jelskii =

Scientific classification
- Domain: Eukaryota
- Kingdom: Animalia
- Phylum: Arthropoda
- Class: Insecta
- Order: Lepidoptera
- Family: Tortricidae
- Genus: Netechma
- Species: N. jelskii

Binomial name
- Netechma jelskii Razowski & Wojtusiak, 2008

Species of moth

Netechma jelskii is a species of moth of the family Tortricidae. It is found in Cotopaxi Province, Ecuador.

The wingspan is 15 mm.

== Etymology ==
The species is named in honour of biologist Dr. Konstanty Jelski.
