= Rhythmologa argentoviridana =

Scientific classification
- Kingdom: Animalia
- Phylum: Arthropoda
- Class: Insecta
- Order: Lepidoptera
- Family: Tortricidae
- Genus: Rhythmologa
- Species: R. argentoviridana

Binomial name
- Rhythmologa argentoviridana Razowski & Wojtusiak, 2008

Synonyms
- Rhytmologa argentoviridana

Species of moth

Rhythmologa argentoviridana is a species of moth of the family Tortricidae. It is found in Carchi Province, Ecuador.

The wingspan is 24 mm.
