= Omiostola brunneochroma =

Scientific classification
- Kingdom: Animalia
- Phylum: Arthropoda
- Class: Insecta
- Order: Lepidoptera
- Family: Tortricidae
- Genus: Omiostola
- Species: O. brunneochroma

Binomial name
- Omiostola brunneochroma Razowski & Wojtusiak, 2008

Species of moth

Omiostola brunneochroma is a species of moth of the family Tortricidae. It is found in Carchi Province, Ecuador.

The wingspan is about 20 mm.
