= Omiostola basiramula =

Scientific classification
- Domain: Eukaryota
- Kingdom: Animalia
- Phylum: Arthropoda
- Class: Insecta
- Order: Lepidoptera
- Family: Tortricidae
- Genus: Omiostola
- Species: O. basiramula

Binomial name
- Omiostola basiramula Razowski & Wojtusiak, 2011

Species of moth

Omiostola basiramula is a species of moth of the family Tortricidae. It is found in Colombia.

The wingspan is about 24 mm for males and 26 mm for females.
