= Subterinebrica albitaeniana =

Scientific classification
- Domain: Eukaryota
- Kingdom: Animalia
- Phylum: Arthropoda
- Class: Insecta
- Order: Lepidoptera
- Family: Tortricidae
- Genus: Subterinebrica
- Species: S. albitaeniana

Binomial name
- Subterinebrica albitaeniana Razowski & Wojtusiak, 2008

Species of moth

Subterinebrica albitaeniana is a species of moth of the family Tortricidae. It is found in Zamora-Chinchipe Province, Ecuador.

The wingspan is about 20 mm.
