= Idolatteria bichroma =

Scientific classification
- Domain: Eukaryota
- Kingdom: Animalia
- Phylum: Arthropoda
- Class: Insecta
- Order: Lepidoptera
- Family: Tortricidae
- Genus: Idolatteria
- Species: I. bichroma

Binomial name
- Idolatteria bichroma Razowski & Wojtusiak, 2008

Species of moth

Idolatteria bichroma is a species of moth of the family Tortricidae. It is found in Carchi Province, Ecuador.

The wingspan is about 17 mm.
