= Rhythmologa polyfenestra =

Scientific classification
- Domain: Eukaryota
- Kingdom: Animalia
- Phylum: Arthropoda
- Class: Insecta
- Order: Lepidoptera
- Family: Tortricidae
- Genus: Rhythmologa
- Species: R. polyfenestra

Binomial name
- Rhythmologa polyfenestra Razowski & Wojtusiak, 2009

Synonyms
- Rhytmologa polyfenestra

Species of moth

Rhythmologa polyfenestra is a species of moth of the family Tortricidae. It is found in Zamora-Chinchipe Province, Ecuador.

The wingspan is 18 mm.
