= Bidorpitia unguifera =

Scientific classification
- Kingdom: Animalia
- Phylum: Arthropoda
- Class: Insecta
- Order: Lepidoptera
- Family: Tortricidae
- Genus: Bidorpitia
- Species: B. unguifera

Binomial name
- Bidorpitia unguifera Razowski & Wojtusiak, 2008

Species of moth

Bidorpitia unguifera is a species of moth of the family Tortricidae. It is found in Carchi Province, Ecuador.

The wingspan is about 21 mm.
