= Subterinebrica labyrinthana =

Scientific classification
- Domain: Eukaryota
- Kingdom: Animalia
- Phylum: Arthropoda
- Class: Insecta
- Order: Lepidoptera
- Family: Tortricidae
- Genus: Subterinebrica
- Species: S. labyrinthana

Binomial name
- Subterinebrica labyrinthana Razowski & Wojtusiak, 2009

Species of moth

Subterinebrica labyrinthana is a species of moth of the family Tortricidae. It is found in Morona-Santiago Province, Ecuador.

The wingspan is about 23 mm.
