= Tsinilla ubericolor =

Scientific classification
- Domain: Eukaryota
- Kingdom: Animalia
- Phylum: Arthropoda
- Class: Insecta
- Order: Lepidoptera
- Family: Tortricidae
- Genus: Tsinilla
- Species: T. ubericolor

Binomial name
- Tsinilla ubericolor Razowski & Wojtusiak, 2008

Species of moth

Tsinilla ubericolor is a species of moth of the family Tortricidae. It is found in Colombia and Carchi Province, Ecuador.

The wingspan is about 22 mm.

== Etymology ==
The species name refers to the colouration of the forewing and is derived from Latin uber (meaning rich).
