= Oregocerata recurrens =

Scientific classification
- Kingdom: Animalia
- Phylum: Arthropoda
- Class: Insecta
- Order: Lepidoptera
- Family: Tortricidae
- Genus: Oregocerata
- Species: O. recurrens

Binomial name
- Oregocerata recurrens Razowski & Wojtusiak, 2008

Species of moth

Oregocerata recurrens is a species of moth of the family Tortricidae. It is found in Cotopaxi Province, Ecuador.

The wingspan is 21 mm.
