= Vulpoxena falcaria =

Scientific classification
- Domain: Eukaryota
- Kingdom: Animalia
- Phylum: Arthropoda
- Class: Insecta
- Order: Lepidoptera
- Family: Tortricidae
- Genus: Vulpoxena
- Species: V. falcaria

Binomial name
- Vulpoxena falcaria Razowski & Wojtusiak, 2008

Species of moth

Vulpoxena falcaria is a species of moth of the family Tortricidae. It is found in Morona-Santiago Province, Ecuador.

The wingspan is about 20 mm.
