= Netechma brunneochra =

Scientific classification
- Kingdom: Animalia
- Phylum: Arthropoda
- Class: Insecta
- Order: Lepidoptera
- Family: Tortricidae
- Genus: Netechma
- Species: N. brunneochra

Binomial name
- Netechma brunneochra Razowski & Wojtusiak, 2006

Species of moth

Netechma brunneochra is a species of moth of the family Tortricidae. It is known from Morona-Santiago Province, Ecuador, and from Department of Amazonas, Peru. It has been collected at 2,600–2,980 m (8,530–9,780 ft) above sea level.

The wingspan is 24–25 millimetres (0.94–0.98 in).
