= Bidorpitia ceramica =

Scientific classification
- Domain: Eukaryota
- Kingdom: Animalia
- Phylum: Arthropoda
- Class: Insecta
- Order: Lepidoptera
- Family: Tortricidae
- Genus: Bidorpitia
- Species: B. ceramica

Binomial name
- Bidorpitia ceramica Razowski & Wojtusiak, 2006

Species of moth

Bidorpitia ceramica is a species of moth of the family Tortricidae. It is found in Ecuador (Morona-Santiago Province and Napo Province).

The wingspan is about 24 millimetres (0.94 in).
