= Bidorpitia arbitralis =

Scientific classification
- Domain: Eukaryota
- Kingdom: Animalia
- Phylum: Arthropoda
- Class: Insecta
- Order: Lepidoptera
- Family: Tortricidae
- Genus: Bidorpitia
- Species: B. arbitralis

Binomial name
- Bidorpitia arbitralis Razowski & Wojtusiak, 2010

Species of moth

Bidorpitia arbitralis is a species of moth of the family Tortricidae. It is found in Peru.

The wingspan is about 25 mm.
