= Punctapinella paraconchitis =

Scientific classification
- Domain: Eukaryota
- Kingdom: Animalia
- Phylum: Arthropoda
- Class: Insecta
- Order: Lepidoptera
- Family: Tortricidae
- Genus: Punctapinella
- Species: P. paraconchitis

Binomial name
- Punctapinella paraconchitis Razowski & Wojtusiak, 2008

Species of moth

Punctapinella paraconchitis is a species of moth of the family Tortricidae. It is found in Ecuador in Sucumbíos and Zamora-Chinchipe provinces.

The wingspan is 22 mm.
