= Punctapinella guamoteana =

Scientific classification
- Domain: Eukaryota
- Kingdom: Animalia
- Phylum: Arthropoda
- Class: Insecta
- Order: Lepidoptera
- Family: Tortricidae
- Genus: Punctapinella
- Species: P. guamoteana

Binomial name
- Punctapinella guamoteana Razowski & Wojtusiak, 2009

Species of moth

Punctapinella guamoteana is a species of moth of the family Tortricidae. It is found in Morona-Santiago Province, Ecuador.

The wingspan is 20.5 mm.
