= Idolatteria ops =

Scientific classification
- Domain: Eukaryota
- Kingdom: Animalia
- Phylum: Arthropoda
- Class: Insecta
- Order: Lepidoptera
- Family: Tortricidae
- Genus: Idolatteria
- Species: I. ops

Binomial name
- Idolatteria ops Razowski & Wojtusiak, 2008

Species of moth

Idolatteria ops is a species of moth of the family Tortricidae. It is found in Peru.

The wingspan is about 21 mm.
