= Bidorpitia biforis =

Scientific classification
- Kingdom: Animalia
- Phylum: Arthropoda
- Class: Insecta
- Order: Lepidoptera
- Family: Tortricidae
- Genus: Bidorpitia
- Species: B. biforis

Binomial name
- Bidorpitia biforis Razowski & Wojtusiak, 2008

Species of moth

Bidorpitia biforis is a species of moth of the family Tortricidae. It is found in Cotopaxi Province, Ecuador.

The wingspan is about 15 mm.
