= Ernocornutia paracatopta =

Scientific classification
- Kingdom: Animalia
- Phylum: Arthropoda
- Clade: Pancrustacea
- Class: Insecta
- Order: Lepidoptera
- Family: Tortricidae
- Genus: Ernocornutia
- Species: E. paracatopta

Binomial name
- Ernocornutia paracatopta Razowski & Wojtusiak, 2008

Species of moth

Ernocornutia paracatopta is a species of moth of the family Tortricidae. It is found in Napo Province, Ecuador.

The wingspan is 18 mm.
