= Bidorpitia columna =

Scientific classification
- Kingdom: Animalia
- Phylum: Arthropoda
- Class: Insecta
- Order: Lepidoptera
- Family: Tortricidae
- Genus: Bidorpitia
- Species: B. columna

Binomial name
- Bidorpitia columna Razowski & Wojtusiak, 2008

Species of moth

Bidorpitia columna is a species of moth of the family Tortricidae. It is found in Loja Province, Ecuador.

The wingspan is about 14 mm for males and 27 mm for females.

== Etymology ==
The species name refers to shape of the uncus and is derived from Latin columna (meaning column).
