= Galomecalpa tingomaria =

Scientific classification
- Domain: Eukaryota
- Kingdom: Animalia
- Phylum: Arthropoda
- Class: Insecta
- Order: Lepidoptera
- Family: Tortricidae
- Genus: Galomecalpa
- Species: G. tingomaria

Binomial name
- Galomecalpa tingomaria Razowski & Wojtusiak, 2010

Species of moth

Galomecalpa tingomaria is a species of moth of the family Tortricidae. It is found in Peru.

The wingspan is 23–25 mm.

== Etymology ==
The species name refers to the type locality, Tingo María.
