= Omiostola splendissima =

Scientific classification
- Kingdom: Animalia
- Phylum: Arthropoda
- Class: Insecta
- Order: Lepidoptera
- Family: Tortricidae
- Genus: Omiostola
- Species: O. splendissima

Binomial name
- Omiostola splendissima Razowski & Wojtusiak, 2008

Species of moth

Omiostola splendissima is a species of moth of the family Tortricidae. It is found in Carchi Province, Ecuador.

The wingspan is about 20 mm.

== Etymology ==
The species name refers to the colouration of the species and is derived from Latin splendissimus (meaning the most splendid).
