= Netechma chytrostium =

Scientific classification
- Domain: Eukaryota
- Kingdom: Animalia
- Phylum: Arthropoda
- Class: Insecta
- Order: Lepidoptera
- Family: Tortricidae
- Genus: Netechma
- Species: N. chytrostium

Binomial name
- Netechma chytrostium Razowski & Wojtusiak, 2006

Species of moth

Netechma chytrostium is a species of moth of the family Tortricidae. It is endemic to Ecuador (Morona-Santiago Province).

The wingspan is 20 millimetres (0.79 in).
