= Oregocerata magna =

Scientific classification
- Domain: Eukaryota
- Kingdom: Animalia
- Phylum: Arthropoda
- Class: Insecta
- Order: Lepidoptera
- Family: Tortricidae
- Genus: Oregocerata
- Species: O. magna

Binomial name
- Oregocerata magna Razowski & Wojtusiak, 2009

Species of moth

Oregocerata magna is a species of moth of the family Tortricidae. It is found in Napo Province, Ecuador.

The wingspan is 30 mm.
