= Netechma tenuifascia =

Scientific classification
- Domain: Eukaryota
- Kingdom: Animalia
- Phylum: Arthropoda
- Class: Insecta
- Order: Lepidoptera
- Family: Tortricidae
- Genus: Netechma
- Species: N. tenuifascia

Binomial name
- Netechma tenuifascia Razowski & Wojtusiak, 2009

Species of moth

Netechma tenuifascia is a species of moth of the family Tortricidae. It is found in Tungurahua Province, Ecuador.

The wingspan is 20 mm.
