= Toreulia acanthina =

Scientific classification
- Kingdom: Animalia
- Phylum: Arthropoda
- Class: Insecta
- Order: Lepidoptera
- Family: Tortricidae
- Genus: Toreulia
- Species: T. acanthina

Binomial name
- Toreulia acanthina Razowski, Pelz & Wojtusiak, 2007

Species of moth

Toreulia acanthina is a species of moth of the family Tortricidae. It is found in Napo Province, Ecuador.

The wingspan is 17–25 mm.
