= Oregocerata colossa =

Scientific classification
- Domain: Eukaryota
- Kingdom: Animalia
- Phylum: Arthropoda
- Class: Insecta
- Order: Lepidoptera
- Family: Tortricidae
- Genus: Oregocerata
- Species: O. colossa

Binomial name
- Oregocerata colossa Razowski & Wojtusiak, 2006

Species of moth

Oregocerata colossa is a species of moth of the family Tortricidae. It is known from Venezuela.

The wingspan is 30 millimetres (1.2 in).
