= Ernocornutia basisignata =

Scientific classification
- Domain: Eukaryota
- Kingdom: Animalia
- Phylum: Arthropoda
- Class: Insecta
- Order: Lepidoptera
- Family: Tortricidae
- Genus: Ernocornutia
- Species: E. basisignata

Binomial name
- Ernocornutia basisignata Razowski & Wojtusiak, 2010

Species of moth

Ernocornutia basisignata is a species of moth of the family Tortricidae. It is found in Peru.

The wingspan is 15 mm.
