= Romanaria cedrana =

Scientific classification
- Domain: Eukaryota
- Kingdom: Animalia
- Phylum: Arthropoda
- Class: Insecta
- Order: Lepidoptera
- Family: Tortricidae
- Genus: Romanaria
- Species: R. cedrana

Binomial name
- Romanaria cedrana Razowski & Wojtusiak, 2010

Species of moth

Romanaria cedrana is a species of moth of the family Tortricidae. It is found in Peru.

The wingspan is 26 mm.

== Etymology ==
The species name refers to El Cedro, the type locality.
