= Punctapinella marginipunctata =

Scientific classification
- Kingdom: Animalia
- Phylum: Arthropoda
- Clade: Pancrustacea
- Class: Insecta
- Order: Lepidoptera
- Family: Tortricidae
- Genus: Punctapinella
- Species: P. marginipunctata

Binomial name
- Punctapinella marginipunctata Razowski & Wojtusiak, 2013

Species of moth

Punctapinella marginipunctata is a species of moth of the family Tortricidae. It is found in Bolivia.

The wingspan is about 23 mm.
