= Tsinilla unciphrona =

Scientific classification
- Domain: Eukaryota
- Kingdom: Animalia
- Phylum: Arthropoda
- Class: Insecta
- Order: Lepidoptera
- Family: Tortricidae
- Genus: Tsinilla
- Species: T. unciphrona

Binomial name
- Tsinilla unciphrona Razowski & Wojtusiak, 2011

Species of moth

Tsinilla unciphrona is a species of moth of the family Tortricidae. It is found in Colombia.

The wingspan is about 20 mm.

== Etymology ==
The species name refers to the presence of the uncus and is derived from Greek phrone (meaning 'I carry').
