= Ernocornutia limona =

Scientific classification
- Domain: Eukaryota
- Kingdom: Animalia
- Phylum: Arthropoda
- Class: Insecta
- Order: Lepidoptera
- Family: Tortricidae
- Genus: Ernocornutia
- Species: E. limona

Binomial name
- Ernocornutia limona Razowski & Wojtusiak, 2006

Species of moth

Ernocornutia limona is a species of moth of the family Tortricidae. It is endemic to Ecuador (Morona-Santiago Province).
