= Galomecalpa quatrofascia =

Scientific classification
- Domain: Eukaryota
- Kingdom: Animalia
- Phylum: Arthropoda
- Class: Insecta
- Order: Lepidoptera
- Family: Tortricidae
- Genus: Galomecalpa
- Species: G. quatrofascia

Binomial name
- Galomecalpa quatrofascia Razowski & Wojtusiak, 2009

Species of moth

Galomecalpa quatrofascia is a species of moth of the family Tortricidae. It is found in Ecuador (Pichincha Province).

== Description ==
The wingspan is 34 millimetres (1.3 in).
