= Netechma triangulum =

Scientific classification
- Domain: Eukaryota
- Kingdom: Animalia
- Phylum: Arthropoda
- Class: Insecta
- Order: Lepidoptera
- Family: Tortricidae
- Genus: Netechma
- Species: N. triangulum

Binomial name
- Netechma triangulum Razowski & Wojtusiak, 2006

Species of moth

Netechma triangulum is a species of moth of the family Tortricidae. It is endemic to Ecuador (Morona-Santiago Province).

The wingspan is 22 millimetres (0.87 in) for males and 25 millimetres (0.98 in) for females.
