= Galomecalpa tamaria =

Scientific classification
- Domain: Eukaryota
- Kingdom: Animalia
- Phylum: Arthropoda
- Class: Insecta
- Order: Lepidoptera
- Family: Tortricidae
- Genus: Galomecalpa
- Species: G. tamaria

Binomial name
- Galomecalpa tamaria Razowski & Wojtusiak, 2013

Species of moth

Galomecalpa tamaria is a species of moth of the family Tortricidae. It is found in Bolivia.

The wingspan is about 27 mm.

== Etymology ==
The species name refers to the type locality: Villa Tamari in Bolivia.
