= Netechma gnathocera =

Scientific classification
- Domain: Eukaryota
- Kingdom: Animalia
- Phylum: Arthropoda
- Class: Insecta
- Order: Lepidoptera
- Family: Tortricidae
- Genus: Netechma
- Species: N. gnathocera

Binomial name
- Netechma gnathocera Razowski & Wojtusiak, 2006

Species of moth

Netechma gnathocera is a species of moth of the family Tortricidae. It is found in Venezuela.

The wingspan is 22 millimetres (0.87 in).

== Etymology ==
The specific name refers to a long terminal plate of the gnathos – the ending ceros means a horn (actually attested in ancient Greek as κέρας (kéras)).
