= Netechma simulans =

Scientific classification
- Domain: Eukaryota
- Kingdom: Animalia
- Phylum: Arthropoda
- Class: Insecta
- Order: Lepidoptera
- Family: Tortricidae
- Genus: Netechma
- Species: N. simulans

Binomial name
- Netechma simulans Razowski & Wojtusiak, 2009

Species of moth

Netechma simulans is a species of moth of the family Tortricidae. It is found in Napo Province, Ecuador.

The wingspan is 25 mm for males and 27 mm for females.
