= Ernocornutia pululahuana =

Scientific classification
- Domain: Eukaryota
- Kingdom: Animalia
- Phylum: Arthropoda
- Class: Insecta
- Order: Lepidoptera
- Family: Tortricidae
- Genus: Ernocornutia
- Species: E. pululahuana

Binomial name
- Ernocornutia pululahuana Razowski & Wojtusiak, 2008

Species of moth

Ernocornutia pululahuana is a species of moth of the family Tortricidae. It is found in Pichincha Province, Ecuador.

The wingspan is 18.5 mm.
