= Netechma guamotea =

Scientific classification
- Domain: Eukaryota
- Kingdom: Animalia
- Phylum: Arthropoda
- Class: Insecta
- Order: Lepidoptera
- Family: Tortricidae
- Genus: Netechma
- Species: N. guamotea

Binomial name
- Netechma guamotea Razowski & Wojtusiak, 2009

Species of moth

Netechma guamotea is a species of moth of the family Tortricidae. It is found in Morona-Santiago Province, Ecuador.

The wingspan is 15 mm.

== Etymology ==
The species name refers to the type locality.
