= Netechma nigricunea =

Scientific classification
- Kingdom: Animalia
- Phylum: Arthropoda
- Class: Insecta
- Order: Lepidoptera
- Family: Tortricidae
- Genus: Netechma
- Species: N. nigricunea

Binomial name
- Netechma nigricunea Razowski & Wojtusiak, 2006

Species of moth

Netechma nigricunea is a species of moth of the family Tortricidae. It is known from Morona-Santiago Province, Ecuador, and from Yanachaga–Chemillén National Park, Peru. It has been collected at 2,200–2,750 m (7,220–9,020 ft) above sea level.

The wingspan is 18–23 millimetres (0.71–0.91 in).
