= Tsinilla tristis =

Scientific classification
- Domain: Eukaryota
- Kingdom: Animalia
- Phylum: Arthropoda
- Class: Insecta
- Order: Lepidoptera
- Family: Tortricidae
- Genus: Tsinilla
- Species: T. tristis

Binomial name
- Tsinilla tristis Razowski & Wojtusiak, 2008

Species of moth

Tsinilla tristis is a species of moth of the family Tortricidae. It is found in Pichincha Province, Ecuador.

The wingspan is about 18.5 mm.
