= Clarkenia pantherina =

Scientific classification
- Domain: Eukaryota
- Kingdom: Animalia
- Phylum: Arthropoda
- Class: Insecta
- Order: Lepidoptera
- Family: Tortricidae
- Genus: Clarkenia
- Species: C. pantherina

Binomial name
- Clarkenia pantherina Razowski & Wojtusiak, 2009

Species of moth

Clarkenia pantherina is a species of moth of the family Tortricidae. It is endemic to Ecuador (Napo Province).

The wingspan is 35 millimetres (1.4 in).
