= Toreulia runtunana =

Scientific classification
- Kingdom: Animalia
- Phylum: Arthropoda
- Class: Insecta
- Order: Lepidoptera
- Family: Tortricidae
- Genus: Toreulia
- Species: T. runtunana

Binomial name
- Toreulia runtunana Razowski, Pelz & Wojtusiak, 2007

Species of moth

Toreulia runtunana is a species of moth of the family Tortricidae. It is found in Tungurahua Province, Ecuador.

The wingspan is about 28.5 mm.

== Etymology ==
The species name refers to Runtun, the type locality.
