= Netechma cordillerana =

Scientific classification
- Domain: Eukaryota
- Kingdom: Animalia
- Phylum: Arthropoda
- Class: Insecta
- Order: Lepidoptera
- Family: Tortricidae
- Genus: Netechma
- Species: N. cordillerana

Binomial name
- Netechma cordillerana Razowski & Wojtusiak, 2006

Species of moth

Netechma cordillerana is a species of moth of the family Tortricidae first described by Józef Razowski and Janusz Wojtusiak in 2006 It is endemic to Colombia.

The wingspan is 17 millimetres (0.67 in).
