= Romanaria spasmaria =

Scientific classification
- Domain: Eukaryota
- Kingdom: Animalia
- Phylum: Arthropoda
- Class: Insecta
- Order: Lepidoptera
- Family: Tortricidae
- Genus: Romanaria
- Species: R. spasmaria

Binomial name
- Romanaria spasmaria Razowski & Wojtusiak, 2006

Species of moth

Romanaria spasmaria is a species of moth of the family Tortricidae. It is found in Morona-Santiago Province, Ecuador.

The wingspan is 17 mm.
