= Netechma camelana =

Scientific classification
- Domain: Eukaryota
- Kingdom: Animalia
- Phylum: Arthropoda
- Class: Insecta
- Order: Lepidoptera
- Family: Tortricidae
- Genus: Netechma
- Species: N. camelana

Binomial name
- Netechma camelana Razowski & Wojtusiak, 2008

Species of moth

Netechma camelana is a species of moth of the family Tortricidae. It is found in Ecuador (Pichincha Province) and Colombia.
