= Omiostola triangulifera =

Scientific classification
- Kingdom: Animalia
- Phylum: Arthropoda
- Class: Insecta
- Order: Lepidoptera
- Family: Tortricidae
- Genus: Omiostola
- Species: O. triangulifera

Binomial name
- Omiostola triangulifera Razowski & Wojtusiak, 2008

Species of moth

Omiostola triangulifera is a species of moth of the family Tortricidae. It is found in Colombia and Pichincha Province, Ecuador.

Its wingspan is about 27 mm.
