= Galomecalpa majestica =

Scientific classification
- Kingdom: Animalia
- Phylum: Arthropoda
- Class: Insecta
- Order: Lepidoptera
- Family: Tortricidae
- Genus: Galomecalpa
- Species: G. majestica

Binomial name
- Galomecalpa majestica Meyrick & Wojtusiak, 2013

Species of moth

Galomecalpa majestica is a species of moth of the family Tortricidae. It is found in Bolivia. It is the tiniest in this moth family.

The wingspan is about 34 mm.
