= Toreulia imminuta =

Scientific classification
- Kingdom: Animalia
- Phylum: Arthropoda
- Class: Insecta
- Order: Lepidoptera
- Family: Tortricidae
- Genus: Toreulia
- Species: T. imminuta

Binomial name
- Toreulia imminuta Razowski, Pelz & Wojtusiak, 2007

Species of moth

Toreulia imminuta is a species of moth of the family Tortricidae. It is found in Ecuador in the provinces of Napo and Morona-Santiago.

The wingspan is 5–10 mm.
