= Ernocornutia sangayana =

Scientific classification
- Domain: Eukaryota
- Kingdom: Animalia
- Phylum: Arthropoda
- Class: Insecta
- Order: Lepidoptera
- Family: Tortricidae
- Genus: Ernocornutia
- Species: E. sangayana

Binomial name
- Ernocornutia sangayana Razowski & Wojtusiak, 2008

Species of moth

Ernocornutia sangayana is a species of moth of the family Tortricidae. It is found in Morona-Santiago Province, Ecuador.

The wingspan is 18 mm.
