= Thalleulia pondoana =

Scientific classification
- Domain: Eukaryota
- Kingdom: Animalia
- Phylum: Arthropoda
- Class: Insecta
- Order: Lepidoptera
- Family: Tortricidae
- Genus: Thalleulia
- Species: T. pondoana

Binomial name
- Thalleulia pondoana Razowski & Wojtusiak, 2009

Species of moth

Thalleulia pondoana is a species of moth of the family Tortricidae. It is found in Tungurahua Province, Ecuador.

The wingspan is about 18 mm.
