= Bidorpitia banosana =

Scientific classification
- Kingdom: Animalia
- Phylum: Arthropoda
- Class: Insecta
- Order: Lepidoptera
- Family: Tortricidae
- Genus: Bidorpitia
- Species: B. banosana

Binomial name
- Bidorpitia banosana Razowski & Wojtusiak, 2008

Species of moth

Bidorpitia banosana is a species of moth of the family Tortricidae. It is found in Tungurahua Province, Ecuador.

The wingspan is about 24 mm.

== Etymology ==
The species name refers to the type locality, Baños.
