= Netechma brevidagus =

Scientific classification
- Domain: Eukaryota
- Kingdom: Animalia
- Phylum: Arthropoda
- Class: Insecta
- Order: Lepidoptera
- Family: Tortricidae
- Genus: Netechma
- Species: N. brevidagus

Binomial name
- Netechma brevidagus Razowski & Wojtusiak, 2010

Species of moth

Netechma brevidagus is a species of moth of the family Tortricidae. It is found in Peru.

The wingspan is 15 mm.
