= Netechma napoana =

Scientific classification
- Domain: Eukaryota
- Kingdom: Animalia
- Phylum: Arthropoda
- Class: Insecta
- Order: Lepidoptera
- Family: Tortricidae
- Genus: Netechma
- Species: N. napoana

Binomial name
- Netechma napoana Razowski & Wojtusiak, 2009

Species of moth

Netechma napoana is a species of moth of the family Tortricidae. It is found in Napo Province, Ecuador.

The wingspan is 20 mm.
