= Romanaria =

Scientific classification
- Domain: Eukaryota
- Kingdom: Animalia
- Phylum: Arthropoda
- Class: Insecta
- Order: Lepidoptera
- Family: Tortricidae
- Tribe: Euliini
- Genus: Romanaria; Razowski & Wojtusiak, 2006

Genus of tortrix moths

Romanaria is a genus of moths of the family Tortricidae.

== Species ==
- Romanaria chachapoyas Razowski & Wojtusiak, 2010
- Romanaria cedrana Razowski & Wojtusiak, 2010
- Romanaria leuca Razowski & Wojtusiak, 2009
- Romanaria spasmaria Razowski & Wojtusiak, 2006

== Etymology ==
The genus name Romanaria is derived from the first name Roman to commemorate late professor of zoology of the Jagiellonian University and father of describer Janusz Wojtusiak, Roman Wojtusiak.

== See also ==
- List of Tortricidae genera
