= Romanaria leuca =

Scientific classification
- Domain: Eukaryota
- Kingdom: Animalia
- Phylum: Arthropoda
- Class: Insecta
- Order: Lepidoptera
- Family: Tortricidae
- Genus: Romanaria
- Species: R. leuca

Binomial name
- Romanaria leuca Razowski & Wojtusiak, 2009

Species of moth

Romanaria leuca is a species of moth of the family Tortricidae. It is found in Napo Province, Ecuador.

The wingspan is 16 mm.
