= Galomecalpa lesta =

Scientific classification
- Kingdom: Animalia
- Phylum: Arthropoda
- Class: Insecta
- Order: Lepidoptera
- Family: Tortricidae
- Genus: Galomecalpa
- Species: G. lesta

Binomial name
- Galomecalpa lesta Razowski & Pelz, 2013

Species of moth

Galomecalpa lesta is a species of moth of the family Tortricidae. It is found in Pastaza Province, Ecuador.

The wingspan is about 14 mm.
