= Vulpoxena vulpicoma =

Scientific classification
- Kingdom: Animalia
- Phylum: Arthropoda
- Class: Insecta
- Order: Lepidoptera
- Family: Tortricidae
- Genus: Vulpoxena
- Species: V. vulpicoma

Binomial name
- Vulpoxena vulpicoma (Meyrick, 1932)

Synonyms
- Spatalistis vulpicoma Meyrick, 1932

Species of moth

Vulpoxena vulpicoma is a species of moth of the family Tortricidae. It is found in Santa Catarina, Brazil.
