= Netechma praecipua =

Scientific classification
- Kingdom: Animalia
- Phylum: Arthropoda
- Class: Insecta
- Order: Lepidoptera
- Family: Tortricidae
- Genus: Netechma
- Species: N. praecipua

Binomial name
- Netechma praecipua (Meyrick, 1917)

Synonyms
- Cnephasia praecipua Meyrick, 1917; Anopina praecipua

Species of moth

Netechma praecipua is a moth of the family Tortricidae. It is found in Colombia.
