= Galomecalpa megaloplaca =

Scientific classification
- Kingdom: Animalia
- Phylum: Arthropoda
- Class: Insecta
- Order: Lepidoptera
- Family: Tortricidae
- Genus: Galomecalpa
- Species: G. megaloplaca

Binomial name
- Galomecalpa megaloplaca (Meyrick, 1932)

Synonyms
- Eulia megaloplaca Meyrick, 1932

Species of moth

Galomecalpa megaloplaca is a species of moth of the family Tortricidae. It is found in Bolivia.
