= Galomecalpa suffusca =

Scientific classification
- Domain: Eukaryota
- Kingdom: Animalia
- Phylum: Arthropoda
- Class: Insecta
- Order: Lepidoptera
- Family: Tortricidae
- Genus: Galomecalpa
- Species: G. suffusca

Binomial name
- Galomecalpa suffusca Razowski & Pelz, 2006

Species of insect

Galomecalpa suffusca is a species of moth of the family Tortricidae. It is found in Ecuador (Napo Province).

The wingspan is 20 millimetres (0.79 in).
