= Oregocerata caucana =

Scientific classification
- Kingdom: Animalia
- Phylum: Arthropoda
- Class: Insecta
- Order: Lepidoptera
- Family: Tortricidae
- Genus: Oregocerata
- Species: O. caucana

Binomial name
- Oregocerata caucana Razowski & Brown, 2005

Species of moth

Oregocerata caucana is a species of moth of the family Tortricidae. It is found in Colombia.

The length of the forewings is about 8.7 mm.
