= Omiostola =

Scientific classification
- Kingdom: Animalia
- Phylum: Arthropoda
- Class: Insecta
- Order: Lepidoptera
- Family: Tortricidae
- Tribe: Olethreutini
- Genus: Omiostola; Meyrick, 1922

Genus of tortrix moths

Omiostola is a genus of moths belonging to the subfamily Olethreutinae of the family Tortricidae.

== Species ==
- Omiostola adamantea Meyrick, 1922
- Omiostola albidobrunnea Razowski & Wojtusiak, 2010
- Omiostola alphitopa Meyrick, 1922
- Omiostola basiramula Razowski & Wojtusiak, 2011
- Omiostola brunneochroma Razowski & Wojtusiak, 2008
- Omiostola delta Razowski & Wojtusiak, 2008
- Omiostola detodesma Razowski & Wojtusiak, 2011
- Omiostola gerda (Busck, 1911)
- Omiostola hemeropis (Dognin, 1912)
- Omiostola melanaspis (Meyrick, 1927)
- Omiostola paradelta Razowski & Wojtusiak, 2010
- Omiostola splendissima Razowski & Wojtusiak, 2008
- Omiostola triangulifera Razowski & Wojtusiak, 2008
- Omiostola varablancana (Razowski & Brown, 2010)
- Omiostola youngi Razowski, 1999

== See also ==
- List of Tortricidae genera
