= Omiostola hemeropis =

Scientific classification
- Kingdom: Animalia
- Phylum: Arthropoda
- Class: Insecta
- Order: Lepidoptera
- Family: Tortricidae
- Genus: Omiostola
- Species: O. hemeropis

Binomial name
- Omiostola hemeropis (Dognin, 1912)

Synonyms
- Olethreutes hemeropis Dognin, 1912; Omiostola macrotrachela Meyrick, 1922

Species of moth

Omiostola hemeropis is a species of moth of the family Tortricidae. It is found in Colombia and Ecuador (Cotopaxi Province, Carchi Province, Bolívar Province, Pichincha Province). Omiostola macrotrachela was synonymized with O. hemeropis by Razowski and Becker, 2016.
