= Oregocerata rhyparograpta =

Scientific classification
- Kingdom: Animalia
- Phylum: Arthropoda
- Clade: Pancrustacea
- Class: Insecta
- Order: Lepidoptera
- Family: Tortricidae
- Genus: Oregocerata
- Species: O. rhyparograpta

Binomial name
- Oregocerata rhyparograpta Razowski & Becker, 2002

Synonyms
- Oregocerata rhyparographta Brown, 2005

Species of moth

Oregocerata rhyparograpta is a species of moth of the family Tortricidae. It is found in Pastaza Province, Ecuador.
