= Punctapinella tinajillana =

Scientific classification
- Domain: Eukaryota
- Kingdom: Animalia
- Phylum: Arthropoda
- Class: Insecta
- Order: Lepidoptera
- Family: Tortricidae
- Genus: Punctapinella
- Species: P. tinajillana

Binomial name
- Punctapinella tinajillana Razowski & Pelz, 2004

Species of insect

Punctapinella tinajillana is a species of moth of the family Tortricidae. It is found in Azuay Province, Ecuador.
