= Neopotamia triloba =

Scientific classification
- Domain: Eukaryota
- Kingdom: Animalia
- Phylum: Arthropoda
- Class: Insecta
- Order: Lepidoptera
- Family: Tortricidae
- Genus: Neopotamia
- Species: N. triloba

Binomial name
- Neopotamia triloba Razowski, 2009

Species of moth

Neopotamia triloba is a moth of the family Tortricidae. It is found in Vietnam.
