= Netechma consimilis =

Scientific classification
- Kingdom: Animalia
- Phylum: Arthropoda
- Clade: Pancrustacea
- Class: Insecta
- Order: Lepidoptera
- Family: Tortricidae
- Genus: Netechma
- Species: N. consimilis

Binomial name
- Netechma consimilis Razowski & Becker, 2002

Species of moth

Netechma consimilis is a species of moth of the family Tortricidae. It is found in Loja Province, Ecuador.

The wingspan is 17 millimetres (0.67 in) for females.
