= Vulpoxena =

Scientific classification
- Kingdom: Animalia
- Phylum: Arthropoda
- Clade: Pancrustacea
- Class: Insecta
- Order: Lepidoptera
- Family: Tortricidae
- Tribe: Euliini
- Genus: Vulpoxena; Brown, 1991

Genus of tortrix moths

Vulpoxena is a genus of moths belonging to the subfamily Tortricinae of the family Tortricidae. The genus was described by John Wesley Brown in 1991.

== Species ==
- Vulpoxena dentata Razowski & Pelz, 2007
- Vulpoxena falcaria Razowski & Wojtusiak, 2008
- Vulpoxena separabilis Razowski & Wojtusiak, 2010
- Vulpoxena vulpicoma (Meyrick, 1932)

== See also ==
- List of Tortricidae genera
