= Roman Wojtusiak =

Roman Józef Wojtusiak (28 December 1906–5 December 1987) was a Polish zoologist and professor at the Jagiellonian University who specialized in sensory ecology, animal psychology and behaviour. Along with his students and collaborators he established a laboratory that conducted extensive experimentation on the ability of animals to see colour, sense geomagnetism, and radio waves. He was also a pioneer of underwater biological studies.

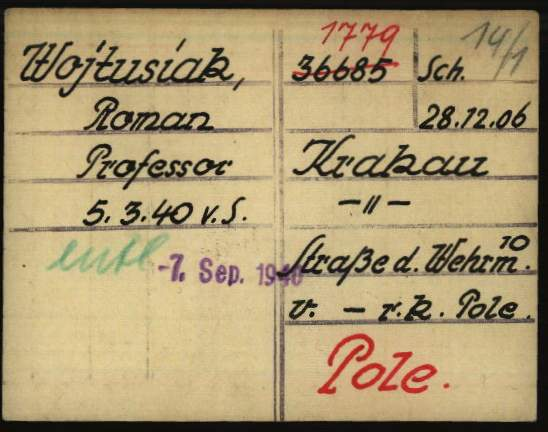
Registration card of Roman Wojtusiak as a prisoner at Dachau Nazi Concentration Camp

Born to Roman, an official of the Polish Railways, and his wife Karolina, who worked in the armed forces, he studied in his home town of Kraków. He studied at the Faculty of Philosophy at the Jagiellonian University from 1925 to 1929. He then studied pedagogy and became a high school teacher at the Gymnasium at St Anna in Kraków. In 1930-35 he received a doctorate in zoology on the basis of a dissertation on vision in turtles. In 1939 he was arrested by the Nazis and deported to Wrocław and later to the concentration camps at Dachau and Sachsenhausen. His wife Halina Wojtusiakova née Franckiewicz (who was a researcher on plant ecology) wrote to Karl von Frisch and Alfred Kühn to intervene. When Kühn was in Göttingen, Wojtusiak had met a student named Walter Greite who later became an officer in the SS in the Ahnenerbe. Greite helped release Wojtusiak (on 8 September 1940) at the behest of Karl von Frisch. He worked from 1941 to 1952 as curator of the museum at Kraków. After the war he became and adjunct professor and from 1946 a full-time associate professor in the department that was later called the department of zoopsychology and animal ethology. He became a professor of zoology in 1948 and he worked at the Jagiellonian University until his retirement in 1976.

Wojtusiak's contributions were very diverse and included studies in oceanography, conservation, ethology and entomology. He devised a diving helmet to help him in studies of underwater organisms under the Gulf of Gdansk. He helped found the Tatra National Park. He supervised numerous students and published books and popular articles in addition to papers in journals. He received numerous awards including the knight of the Order of Polonia Restituta, title of Meritorious Teacher of the Polish People's Republic and Meritorious Maritime Worker, and the Golden Cross of Merit. He was posthumously awarded the Auschwitz Cross. A genus, Romanaria, and a subspecies of moth, Zygaena filipendulae wojtusiaki, were named after him. His son Janusz R. Wojtusiak also became a zoologist.

== Publications ==
A selection of publications:

- Dabrowska, Barbara; Harmata, Wincenty; Lenkiewicz, Zofia; Schiffer, Zofia; Wojtusiak, Roman J (1981). "Colour perception in cows". Behavioural Processes. 6 (1): 1–10. doi:10.1016/0376-6357(81)90011-5. PMID 24925608. S2CID 37212044.
- Wojtusiak, Roman J. (1949-02-01). "Polish investigations on homing in birds and their orientation in space". Proceedings of the Linnean Society of London. 160 (2): 99–108. doi:10.1111/j.1095-8312.1949.tb00519.x. ISSN 0370-0461.
- Wojtusiak, R J; Z Majlert; H Franckiewicz; W Harmata (1980). "Homing experiments on birds. Part XV. The influence of radio waves on the homingof swallows (Hirundo rustica L.)". Folia Biol (Kraków). 28 (2): 127–144.
- Wojtusiak, R.J. (1933). "Über den Farbensinn der Schildkröten [The colour sense of turtles]". Zeitschrift für vergleichende Physiologie. 18 (3): 393–436. doi:10.1007/bf00395731. S2CID 39592414.
