= Netechma sectionalis =

Scientific classification
- Kingdom: Animalia
- Phylum: Arthropoda
- Class: Insecta
- Order: Lepidoptera
- Family: Tortricidae
- Genus: Netechma
- Species: N. sectionalis

Binomial name
- Netechma sectionalis (Meyrick, 1932)

Synonyms
- Eulia sectionalis Meyrick, 1932

Species of moth

Netechma sectionalis is a species of moth of the family Tortricidae. It is found in Costa Rica.
