= Oregocerata cladognathos =

Scientific classification
- Kingdom: Animalia
- Phylum: Arthropoda
- Class: Insecta
- Order: Lepidoptera
- Family: Tortricidae
- Genus: Oregocerata
- Species: O. cladognathos

Binomial name
- Oregocerata cladognathos Razowski, 1999

Species of moth

Oregocerata cladognathos is a species of moth of the family Tortricidae. It is found in Ecuador in the provinces of Pichincha and Morona-Santiago.
