= Galomecalpa meridana =

Scientific classification
- Kingdom: Animalia
- Phylum: Arthropoda
- Class: Insecta
- Order: Lepidoptera
- Family: Tortricidae
- Genus: Galomecalpa
- Species: G. meridana

Binomial name
- Galomecalpa meridana Razowski & Brown, 2004

Species of moth

Galomecalpa meridana is a species of moth of the family Tortricidae. It is found in Venezuela, Ecuador (Napo Province) and Peru.
