= Netechma dentata =

Scientific classification
- Kingdom: Animalia
- Phylum: Arthropoda
- Class: Insecta
- Order: Lepidoptera
- Family: Tortricidae
- Genus: Netechma
- Species: N. dentata

Binomial name
- Netechma dentata (Meyrick, 1917)

Synonyms
- Cnephasia dentata Meyrick, 1917; Netechma dentana Razowski, 1999

Species of moth

Netechma dentata is a species of moth of the family Tortricidae. It is found in Chimborazo Province, Ecuador.
