= Punctapinella cosangana =

Scientific classification
- Kingdom: Animalia
- Phylum: Arthropoda
- Class: Insecta
- Order: Lepidoptera
- Family: Tortricidae
- Genus: Punctapinella
- Species: P. cosangana

Binomial name
- Punctapinella cosangana Razowski & Pelz, 2004

Species of moth

Punctapinella cosangana is a species of moth of the family Tortricidae. It is found in Ecuador in the provinces of Napo and Zamora-Chinchipe.
