= Punctapinella theta =

Scientific classification
- Domain: Eukaryota
- Kingdom: Animalia
- Phylum: Arthropoda
- Class: Insecta
- Order: Lepidoptera
- Family: Tortricidae
- Genus: Punctapinella
- Species: P. theta

Binomial name
- Punctapinella theta Brown, 1991

Species of moth

Punctapinella theta is a species of moth of the family Tortricidae. It is found in Venezuela.
