= Toreulia =

Scientific classification
- Kingdom: Animalia
- Phylum: Arthropoda
- Clade: Pancrustacea
- Class: Insecta
- Order: Lepidoptera
- Family: Tortricidae
- Tribe: Euliini
- Genus: Toreulia; Razowski & Becker, 2000

Genus of tortrix moths

Toreulia is a genus of moths belonging to the family Tortricidae.

== Species ==
- Toreulia acanthina Razowski, Pelz & Wojtusiak, 2007
- Toreulia basalis Razowski & Becker, 2000
- Toreulia imminuta Razowski, Pelz & Wojtusiak, 2007
- Toreulia nimia Razowski & Becker, 2000
- Toreulia placita Razowski, Pelz & Wojtusiak, 2007
- Toreulia runtunana Razowski, Pelz & Wojtusiak, 2007
- Toreulia torrens Razowski & Becker, 2000

== See also ==
- List of Tortricidae genera
