= Subterinebrica impolluta =

Scientific classification
- Kingdom: Animalia
- Phylum: Arthropoda
- Clade: Pancrustacea
- Class: Insecta
- Order: Lepidoptera
- Family: Tortricidae
- Genus: Subterinebrica
- Species: S. impolluta

Binomial name
- Subterinebrica impolluta Razowski & Becker, 2002

Species of moth

Subterinebrica impolluta is a species of moth of the family Tortricidae. It is found in Carchi Province, Ecuador.
