= Idolatteria cantharopisca =

Scientific classification
- Domain: Eukaryota
- Kingdom: Animalia
- Phylum: Arthropoda
- Class: Insecta
- Order: Lepidoptera
- Family: Tortricidae
- Genus: Idolatteria
- Species: I. cantharopisca

Binomial name
- Idolatteria cantharopisca Obraztsov, 1966

Species of moth

Idolatteria cantharopisca is a species of moth of the family Tortricidae. It is found in Bolivia.

The length of the forewings is about 10 mm. The forewings are orange with prismatic green markings, outlined with black. The hindwings are orange with black markings.
