= Punctapinella hypsithrona =

Scientific classification
- Kingdom: Animalia
- Phylum: Arthropoda
- Class: Insecta
- Order: Lepidoptera
- Family: Tortricidae
- Genus: Punctapinella
- Species: P. hypsithrona

Binomial name
- Punctapinella hypsithrona (Meyrick, 1926)

Synonyms
- Eulia hypsithrona Meyrick, 1926

Species of moth

Punctapinella hypsithrona is a species of moth of the family Tortricidae. It is found in Colombia.
