= Punctapinella ambatoana =

Scientific classification
- Kingdom: Animalia
- Phylum: Arthropoda
- Class: Insecta
- Order: Lepidoptera
- Family: Tortricidae
- Genus: Punctapinella
- Species: P. ambatoana

Binomial name
- Punctapinella ambatoana Razowski & Pelz, 2004

Species of moth

Punctapinella ambatoana is a species of moth of the family Tortricidae. It is found in Tungurahua Province, Ecuador.
