= Bidorpitia poolei =

Scientific classification
- Domain: Eukaryota
- Kingdom: Animalia
- Phylum: Arthropoda
- Class: Insecta
- Order: Lepidoptera
- Family: Tortricidae
- Genus: Bidorpitia
- Species: B. poolei

Binomial name
- Bidorpitia poolei Brown, in Brown & Powell, 1991

Species of moth

Bidorpitia poolei is a species of moth of the family Tortricidae. It is found in Venezuela.
