= Neopotamia ioxantha =

Scientific classification
- Kingdom: Animalia
- Phylum: Arthropoda
- Class: Insecta
- Order: Lepidoptera
- Family: Tortricidae
- Genus: Neopotamia
- Species: N. ioxantha

Binomial name
- Neopotamia ioxantha (Meyrick, 1907)

Synonyms
- Enarmonia ioxantha Meyrick, 1907

Species of moth

Neopotamia ioxantha is a moth of the family Tortricidae. It is found in India and Vietnam.
