= Punctapinella =

Scientific classification
- Domain: Eukaryota
- Kingdom: Animalia
- Phylum: Arthropoda
- Class: Insecta
- Order: Lepidoptera
- Family: Tortricidae
- Tribe: Euliini
- Genus: Punctapinella; Brown, 1991

Species
- See text

Genus of tortrix moths

Punctapinella is a genus of moths belonging to the family Tortricidae.

== Species ==
- Punctapinella ambatoana Razowski & Pelz, 2004
- Punctapinella braziliana Brown, 1991
- Punctapinella cerithiphora Razowski & Pelz, 2004
- Punctapinella chione Razowski & Becker, 1999
- Punctapinella chionocarpa (Meyrick, 1932)
- Punctapinella conchitella Razowski & Wojtusiak, 2010
- Punctapinella conchitis (Meyrick, 1912)
- Punctapinella cosangana Razowski & Pelz, 2004
- Punctapinella guamoteana Razowski & Wojtusiak, 2009
- Punctapinella hypsithrona (Meyrick, 1926)
- Punctapinella lojana Razowski & Pelz, 2004
- Punctapinella marginipunctata Razowski & Wojtusiak, 2013
- Punctapinella niphastra (Meyrick, 1931)
- Punctapinella niphochroa Razowski & Becker, 1999
- Punctapinella nivaspis Razowski & Becker, 1999
- Punctapinella paraconchitis Razowski & Wojtusiak, 2008
- Punctapinella paratheta Razowski & Pelz, 2003
- Punctapinella scleroductus Brown, 1991
- Punctapinella theta Brown, 1991
- Punctapinella tinajillana Razowski & Pelz, 2004
- Punctapinella viridargentea Razowski & Wojtusiak, 2009
