= Subterinebrica =

Scientific classification
- Kingdom: Animalia
- Phylum: Arthropoda
- Clade: Pancrustacea
- Class: Insecta
- Order: Lepidoptera
- Family: Tortricidae
- Tribe: Euliini
- Genus: Subterinebrica; Razowski & Becker, 2002

Genus of tortrix moths

Subterinebrica is a genus of moths belonging to the family Tortricidae.

== Species ==
- Subterinebrica albitaeniana Razowski & Wojtusiak, 2008
- Subterinebrica festivaria Razowski & Wojtusiak, 2009
- Subterinebrica impolluta Razowski & Becker, 2002
- Subterinebrica labyrinthana Razowski & Wojtusiak, 2009
- Subterinebrica magnitaeniana Razowski & Wojtusiak, 2008
- Subterinebrica nigrosignatana Razowski & Wojtusiak, 2008

== See also ==
- List of Tortricidae genera
