= Punctapinella cerithiphora =

Scientific classification
- Kingdom: Animalia
- Phylum: Arthropoda
- Class: Insecta
- Order: Lepidoptera
- Family: Tortricidae
- Genus: Punctapinella
- Species: P. cerithiphora

Binomial name
- Punctapinella cerithiphora Razowski & Pelz, 2004

Species of moth

Punctapinella cerithiphora is a species of moth of the family Tortricidae. It is found in Napo Province, Ecuador.
