= Clarkenia superba =

Scientific classification
- Domain: Eukaryota
- Kingdom: Animalia
- Phylum: Arthropoda
- Class: Insecta
- Order: Lepidoptera
- Family: Tortricidae
- Genus: Clarkenia
- Species: C. superba

Binomial name
- Clarkenia superba Razowski, 1988

Species of moth

Clarkenia superba is a species of moth of the family Tortricidae. It is found in Colombia.
