= Galomecalpa defricata =

Scientific classification
- Kingdom: Animalia
- Phylum: Arthropoda
- Class: Insecta
- Order: Lepidoptera
- Family: Tortricidae
- Genus: Galomecalpa
- Species: G. defricata

Binomial name
- Galomecalpa defricata (Meyrick, 1926)

Synonyms
- Eulia defricata Meyrick, 1926; Sisurcana defricata

Species of moth

Galomecalpa defricata is a species of moth of the family Tortricidae. It is found in the Cordillera Oriental of Colombia.
