= Neopotamia =

Scientific classification
- Domain: Eukaryota
- Kingdom: Animalia
- Phylum: Arthropoda
- Class: Insecta
- Order: Lepidoptera
- Family: Tortricidae
- Tribe: Olethreutini
- Genus: Neopotamia; Diakonoff, 1973

Genus of tortrix moths

Neopotamia is a genus of moths belonging to the subfamily Olethreutinae of the family Tortricidae.

== Species ==
- Neopotamia angulata Kawabe, 1995
- Neopotamia armatana Kuznetzov, 1988
- Neopotamia atrigrapta Razowski, 2009
- Neopotamia calogona Diakonoff, 1973
- Neopotamia cathemacta Diakonoff, 1983
- Neopotamia cryptocosma Diakonoff, 1973
- Neopotamia divisa (Walsingham, 1900)
- Neopotamia formosa Kawabe, 1989
- Neopotamia ioxantha (Meyrick, 1907)
- Neopotamia leucotoma Diakonoff, 1973
- Neopotamia ochracea (Walsingham, 1900)
- Neopotamia orophias (Meyrick, 1907)
- Neopotamia punctata Kawabe, 1989
- Neopotamia rubra Kawabe, 1992
- Neopotamia siamensis Kawabe, 1995
- Neopotamia streblopa (Meyrick, 1936)
- Neopotamia tornocroca Diakonoff, 1973
- Neopotamia triloba Razowski, 2009

== See also ==
- List of Tortricidae genera
