= Oregocerata orcula =

Scientific classification
- Kingdom: Animalia
- Phylum: Arthropoda
- Class: Insecta
- Order: Lepidoptera
- Family: Tortricidae
- Genus: Oregocerata
- Species: O. orcula

Binomial name
- Oregocerata orcula Razowski, 1988

Species of moth

Oregocerata orcula is a species of moth of the family Tortricidae. It is found in Bolivia and Zamora-Chinchipe Province, Ecuador.

The forewings are greyish brown without distinct pattern elements.
