= Bidorpitia =

Scientific classification
- Kingdom: Animalia
- Phylum: Arthropoda
- Clade: Pancrustacea
- Class: Insecta
- Order: Lepidoptera
- Family: Tortricidae
- Tribe: Euliini
- Genus: Bidorpitia; Brown, 1991

Synonyms
- Bidorpidia Powell, J.W.Brown & Razowski, 1995

Genus of tortrix moths

Bidorpitia is a genus of moths belonging to the family Tortricidae.

== Species ==
- Bidorpitia arbitralis Razowski & Wojtusiak, 2010
- Bidorpitia banosana Razowski & Wojtusiak, 2008
- Bidorpitia biforis Razowski & Wojtusiak, 2008
- Bidorpitia boliviana Brown, in Brown & Powell, 1991
- Bidorpitia ceramica Razowski & Wojtusiak, 2006
- Bidorpitia columna Razowski & Wojtusiak, 2008
- Bidorpitia cryptica Brown, in Brown & Powell, 1991
- Bidorpitia dictyophanes (Meyrick, 1926)
- Bidorpitia exanthina (Meyrick, 1931)
- Bidorpitia ferruginata Razowski & Pelz, 2007
- Bidorpitia gomphifera Razowski & Wojtusiak, 2008
- Bidorpitia megasaccula Brown, in Brown & Powell, 1991
- Bidorpitia paracolumna Razowski & Wojtusiak, 2008
- Bidorpitia poolei Brown, in Brown & Powell, 1991
- Bidorpitia unguifera Razowski & Wojtusiak, 2008

== See also ==
- List of Tortricidae genera
