= Vulpoxena dentata =

Scientific classification
- Kingdom: Animalia
- Phylum: Arthropoda
- Class: Insecta
- Order: Lepidoptera
- Family: Tortricidae
- Genus: Vulpoxena
- Species: V. dentata

Binomial name
- Vulpoxena dentata Razowski & Pelz, 2007

Species of moth

Vulpoxena dentata is a species of moth of the family Tortricidae. It is found in Napo Province, Ecuador.
