= Bidorpitia boliviana =

Scientific classification
- Kingdom: Animalia
- Phylum: Arthropoda
- Clade: Pancrustacea
- Class: Insecta
- Order: Lepidoptera
- Family: Tortricidae
- Genus: Bidorpitia
- Species: B. boliviana

Binomial name
- Bidorpitia boliviana Brown, in Brown & Powell, 1991

Species of moth

Bidorpitia boliviana is a species of moth of the family Tortricidae. It is found in Bolivia.
