= Galomecalpa monogramma =

Scientific classification
- Domain: Eukaryota
- Kingdom: Animalia
- Phylum: Arthropoda
- Class: Insecta
- Order: Lepidoptera
- Family: Tortricidae
- Genus: Galomecalpa
- Species: G. monogramma

Binomial name
- Galomecalpa monogramma Razowski, 1997

Species of moth

Galomecalpa monogramma is a species of moth of the family Tortricidae. It is found in Peru.
