= Netechma eurychlora =

Scientific classification
- Kingdom: Animalia
- Phylum: Arthropoda
- Class: Insecta
- Order: Lepidoptera
- Family: Tortricidae
- Genus: Netechma
- Species: N. eurychlora

Binomial name
- Netechma eurychlora (Meyrick, 1926)

Synonyms
- Eulia eurychlora Meyrick, 1926

Species of moth

Netechma eurychlora is a species of moth of the family Tortricidae. It is found in Colombia.
