= Oregocerata chrysodetis =

Scientific classification
- Kingdom: Animalia
- Phylum: Arthropoda
- Class: Insecta
- Order: Lepidoptera
- Family: Tortricidae
- Genus: Oregocerata
- Species: O. chrysodetis

Binomial name
- Oregocerata chrysodetis (Meyrick, 1926)

Synonyms
- Tortrix chysodetis Meyrick 1926; Eulia chrysodetis

Species of moth

Oregocerata chrysodetis is a species of moth of the family Tortricidae. It is found in Colombia.
