= Netechma oppressa =

Scientific classification
- Kingdom: Animalia
- Phylum: Arthropoda
- Class: Insecta
- Order: Lepidoptera
- Family: Tortricidae
- Genus: Netechma
- Species: N. oppressa

Binomial name
- Netechma oppressa (Meyrick, 1926)

Synonyms
- Eulia oppressa Meyrick, 1926; Netechma opressana Razowski, 1999

Species of moth

Netechma oppressa is a species of moth of the family Tortricidae. It is found in Colombia.
