= Galomecalpa concolor =

Scientific classification
- Kingdom: Animalia
- Phylum: Arthropoda
- Class: Insecta
- Order: Lepidoptera
- Family: Tortricidae
- Genus: Galomecalpa
- Species: G. concolor

Binomial name
- Galomecalpa concolor Razowski & Pelz, 2006

Species of moth

Galomecalpa concolor is a species of moth of the family Tortricidae. It is found in Tungurahua Province, Ecuador.

The wingspan is 21 mm.
