= Netechma notabilis =

Scientific classification
- Kingdom: Animalia
- Phylum: Arthropoda
- Clade: Pancrustacea
- Class: Insecta
- Order: Lepidoptera
- Family: Tortricidae
- Genus: Netechma
- Species: N. notabilis

Binomial name
- Netechma notabilis Razowski & Becker, 2001

Species of moth

Netechma notabilis is a species of moth of the family Tortricidae. It is found in Carchi Province, Ecuador.
