= Idolatteria fasciata =

Scientific classification
- Domain: Eukaryota
- Kingdom: Animalia
- Phylum: Arthropoda
- Class: Insecta
- Order: Lepidoptera
- Family: Tortricidae
- Genus: Idolatteria
- Species: I. fasciata

Binomial name
- Idolatteria fasciata Obraztsov, 1966

Species of moth

Idolatteria fasciata is a species of moth of the family Tortricidae. It is found in Bolivia.

The length of the forewings is 9.5–10 mm for males and about 11 mm for females. The forewings are orange with prismatic blue or violet markings. The hindwings are orange with brownish-black spots.
