= Punctapinella braziliana =

Scientific classification
- Domain: Eukaryota
- Kingdom: Animalia
- Phylum: Arthropoda
- Class: Insecta
- Order: Lepidoptera
- Family: Tortricidae
- Genus: Punctapinella
- Species: P. braziliana

Binomial name
- Punctapinella braziliana Brown, 1991

Species of moth

Punctapinella braziliana is a species of moth of the family Tortricidae. It is found in Santa Catarina, Brazil.
