= Neopotamia cathemacta =

Scientific classification
- Domain: Eukaryota
- Kingdom: Animalia
- Phylum: Arthropoda
- Class: Insecta
- Order: Lepidoptera
- Family: Tortricidae
- Genus: Neopotamia
- Species: N. cathemacta

Binomial name
- Neopotamia cathemacta Diakonoff, 1983

Species of moth

Neopotamia cathemacta is a moth of the family Tortricidae. It is found in Thailand and Sumatra.
