= Clarkenia cantamen =

Scientific classification
- Kingdom: Animalia
- Phylum: Arthropoda
- Clade: Pancrustacea
- Class: Insecta
- Order: Lepidoptera
- Family: Tortricidae
- Genus: Clarkenia
- Species: C. cantamen

Binomial name
- Clarkenia cantamen Razowski & Becker, 2002

Species of moth

Clarkenia cantamen is a species of moth of the family Tortricidae. It is found in Tungurahua Province, Ecuador.

The wingspan is 16–21 mm (0.63–0.83 in).
