= Netechma consequens =

Scientific classification
- Kingdom: Animalia
- Phylum: Arthropoda
- Class: Insecta
- Order: Lepidoptera
- Family: Tortricidae
- Genus: Netechma
- Species: N. consequens

Binomial name
- Netechma consequens Razowski, 1999

Species of moth

Netechma consequens is a species of moth of the family Tortricidae. It is found in Argentina.
