= Idolatteria orgias =

Scientific classification
- Kingdom: Animalia
- Phylum: Arthropoda
- Class: Insecta
- Order: Lepidoptera
- Family: Tortricidae
- Genus: Idolatteria
- Species: I. orgias

Binomial name
- Idolatteria orgias (Meyrick, 1930)

Synonyms
- Pseudatteria orgias Meyrick, 1930

Species of moth

Idolatteria orgias is a species of moth of the family Tortricidae. It is found in Colombia.
