= Netechma pyrrhocolona =

Scientific classification
- Kingdom: Animalia
- Phylum: Arthropoda
- Class: Insecta
- Order: Lepidoptera
- Family: Tortricidae
- Genus: Netechma
- Species: N. pyrrhocolona

Binomial name
- Netechma pyrrhocolona (Meyrick, 1926)

Synonyms
- Eulia pyrrhocolona Meyrick, 1926

Species of moth

Netechma pyrrhocolona is a species of moth of the family Tortricidae. It is found in Colombia and Ecuador (Pichincha and Carchi provinces).
