= Oregocerata =

Scientific classification
- Kingdom: Animalia
- Phylum: Arthropoda
- Clade: Pancrustacea
- Class: Insecta
- Order: Lepidoptera
- Family: Tortricidae
- Tribe: Euliini
- Genus: Oregocerata; Razowski, 1988

Genus of tortrix moths

Oregocerata is a genus of moths belonging to the family Tortricidae.

== Species ==
- Oregocerata caucana Razowski & Brown, 2005
- Oregocerata chrysodetis (Meyrick, 1926)
- Oregocerata cladognathos Razowski, 1999
- Oregocerata colossa Razowski & Wojtusiak, 2006
- Oregocerata magna Razowski & Wojtusiak, 2009
- Oregocerata medioloba Razowski & Wojtusiak, 2008
- Oregocerata nigrograpta Razowski & Wojtusiak, 2008
- Oregocerata orcula Razowski, 1988
- Oregocerata quadrifurcata Razowski & Brown, 2005
- Oregocerata recurrens Razowski & Wojtusiak, 2008
- Oregocerata rhyparograpta Razowski & Becker, 2002
- Oregocerata submontana Razowski & Brown, 2005
- Oregocerata triangulana Razowski & Brown, 2005
- Oregocerata zonalis Razowski & Becker, 2002

== See also ==
- List of Tortricidae genera
