= Thalleulia =

Scientific classification
- Kingdom: Animalia
- Phylum: Arthropoda
- Class: Insecta
- Order: Lepidoptera
- Family: Tortricidae
- Tribe: Euliini
- Genus: Thalleulia; Razowski, 2004

Genus of tortrix moths

Thalleulia is a genus of moths belonging to the family Tortricidae.

== Species ==
- Thalleulia gracilescens Razowski, 2004
- Thalleulia ochreorufa Razowski & Wojtusiak, 2008
- Thalleulia pondoana Razowski & Wojtusiak, 2009

== Etymology ==
The genus name refers to the relation with other Euliini, plus the prefix thall (meaning a branch or descendant).

== See also ==
- List of Tortricidae genera
