= Netechma enucleata =

Scientific classification
- Kingdom: Animalia
- Phylum: Arthropoda
- Class: Insecta
- Order: Lepidoptera
- Family: Tortricidae
- Genus: Netechma
- Species: N. enucleata

Binomial name
- Netechma enucleata Razowski, 1999

Species of moth

Netechma enucleata is a species of moth of the family Tortricidae.

== Distribution ==
It is found in Colombia.
