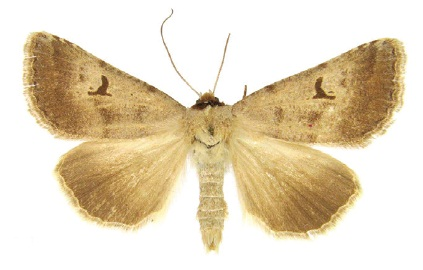

Scientific classification
- Kingdom: Animalia
- Phylum: Arthropoda
- Class: Insecta
- Order: Lepidoptera
- Family: Tortricidae
- Genus: Bidorpitia
- Species: B. ferruginata

Binomial name
- Bidorpitia ferruginata Razowski & Pelz, 2007

= Bidorpitia ferruginata =

Species of moth

Bidorpitia ferruginata is a species of moth of the family Tortricidae. It is found in Ecuador in the provinces of Pastaza and Napo.

The wingspan is about 18 mm for males and 23–24 mm for females.
