= Idolatteria mydros =

Scientific classification
- Domain: Eukaryota
- Kingdom: Animalia
- Phylum: Arthropoda
- Class: Insecta
- Order: Lepidoptera
- Family: Tortricidae
- Genus: Idolatteria
- Species: I. mydros

Binomial name
- Idolatteria mydros Obraztsov, 1966

Species of moth

Idolatteria mydros is a species of moth of the family Tortricidae. It is found in Loja Province, Ecuador.

The length of the forewings is about 11 mm.
