= Bidorpitia exanthina =

Scientific classification
- Kingdom: Animalia
- Phylum: Arthropoda
- Class: Insecta
- Order: Lepidoptera
- Family: Tortricidae
- Genus: Bidorpitia
- Species: B. exanthina

Binomial name
- Bidorpitia exanthina (Meyrick, 1931)

Synonyms
- Eulia exanthina Meyrick, 1931

Species of moth

Bidorpitia exanthina is a species of moth of the family Tortricidae. It is found in Minas Gerais, Brazil.
