= Punctapinella chionocarpa =

Scientific classification
- Kingdom: Animalia
- Phylum: Arthropoda
- Class: Insecta
- Order: Lepidoptera
- Family: Tortricidae
- Genus: Punctapinella
- Species: P. chionocarpa

Binomial name
- Punctapinella chionocarpa (Meyrick, 1932)

Synonyms
- Eulia chionocarpa Meyrick, 1932

Species of moth

Punctapinella chionocarpa is a species of moth of the family Tortricidae. It is found in Colombia.
