= Clarkenia nivescens =

Scientific classification
- Kingdom: Animalia
- Phylum: Arthropoda
- Class: Insecta
- Order: Lepidoptera
- Family: Tortricidae
- Genus: Clarkenia
- Species: C. nivescens

Binomial name
- Clarkenia nivescens (Meyrick, 1926)

Synonyms
- Eulia nivescens Meyrick, 1926

Species of moth

Clarkenia nivescens is a species of moth of the family Tortricidae. The species is found in Colombia and Venezuela.
