= Punctapinella lojana =

Scientific classification
- Kingdom: Animalia
- Phylum: Arthropoda
- Class: Insecta
- Order: Lepidoptera
- Family: Tortricidae
- Genus: Punctapinella
- Species: P. lojana

Binomial name
- Punctapinella lojana Razowski & Pelz, 2004

Species of moth

Punctapinella lojana is a species of moth of the family Tortricidae. It is found in Zamora-Chinchipe Province, Ecuador.
