= Galomecalpa hydrochoa =

Scientific classification
- Kingdom: Animalia
- Phylum: Arthropoda
- Class: Insecta
- Order: Lepidoptera
- Family: Tortricidae
- Genus: Galomecalpa
- Species: G. hydrochoa

Binomial name
- Galomecalpa hydrochoa (Meyrick, 1930)

Synonyms
- Paraptila hydrochoa Meyrick, 1930; Popayanita chydrochoa Razowski, 1999 [1990]; Paraptila hydrochroa Clarke, 1958

Species of moth

Galomecalpa hydrochoa is a species of moth of the family Tortricidae. It is found in Ecuador (Morona-Santiago Province, Napo Province and Chimborazo Province) and Peru.
