= Idolatteria xanthocapna =

Scientific classification
- Kingdom: Animalia
- Phylum: Arthropoda
- Class: Insecta
- Order: Lepidoptera
- Family: Tortricidae
- Genus: Idolatteria
- Species: I. xanthocapna

Binomial name
- Idolatteria xanthocapna (Meyrick, 1930)

Synonyms
- Pseudatteria xanthocapna Meyrick, 1930

Species of moth

Idolatteria xanthocapna is a species of moth of the family Tortricidae. It is found in Colombia.
