= Idolatteria =

Scientific classification
- Domain: Eukaryota
- Kingdom: Animalia
- Phylum: Arthropoda
- Class: Insecta
- Order: Lepidoptera
- Family: Tortricidae
- Tribe: Archipini
- Genus: Idolatteria; Walsingham, 1914

Genus of tortrix moths

Idolatteria is a genus of moths belonging to the subfamily Tortricinae of the family Tortricidae.

== Species ==
- Idolatteria bichroma Razowski & Wojtusiak, 2008
- Idolatteria cantharopisca Obraztsov, 1966
- Idolatteria fasciata Obraztsov, 1966
- Idolatteria maon (Druce, 1901)
- Idolatteria mimica Razowski & Wojtusiak, 2008
- Idolatteria mydros Obraztsov, 1966
- Idolatteria ops Razowski & Wojtusiak, 2008
- Idolatteria orgias (Meyrick, 1930)
- Idolatteria pyropis Walsingham, 1914
- Idolatteria simulatrix Walsingham, 1914
- Idolatteria xanthocapna (Meyrick, 1930)

== See also ==
- List of Tortricidae genera
