= Oregocerata quadrifurcata =

Scientific classification
- Kingdom: Animalia
- Phylum: Arthropoda
- Class: Insecta
- Order: Lepidoptera
- Family: Tortricidae
- Genus: Oregocerata
- Species: O. quadrifurcata

Binomial name
- Oregocerata quadrifurcata Razowski & Brown, 2005

Species of moth

Oregocerata quadrifurcata is a species of moth of the family Tortricidae. It is found in Colombia.

The length of the forewings is about 9 mm.
