= Netechma similis =

Scientific classification
- Kingdom: Animalia
- Phylum: Arthropoda
- Clade: Pancrustacea
- Class: Insecta
- Order: Lepidoptera
- Family: Tortricidae
- Genus: Netechma
- Species: N. similis

Binomial name
- Netechma similis Brown & Adamski, 2002

Species of moth

Netechma similis is a species of moth of the family Tortricidae. It is found in Costa Rica.
