= Netechma lacera =

Scientific classification
- Kingdom: Animalia
- Phylum: Arthropoda
- Class: Insecta
- Order: Lepidoptera
- Family: Tortricidae
- Genus: Netechma
- Species: N. lacera

Binomial name
- Netechma lacera (Razowski, 1997)

Synonyms
- Icteralaria lacera Razowski, 1997

Species of moth

Netechma lacera is a species of moth of the family Tortricidae. It is found in Peru.
