= Rhythmologa yukipana =

Scientific classification
- Kingdom: Animalia
- Phylum: Arthropoda
- Class: Insecta
- Order: Lepidoptera
- Family: Tortricidae
- Genus: Rhythmologa
- Species: R. yukipana

Binomial name
- Rhythmologa yukipana Razowski & Pelz, 2003

Synonyms
- Rhytmologa yukipana

Species of moth

Rhythmologa yukipana is a species of moth of the family Tortricidae. It is found in Morona-Santiago Province, Ecuador.
