= Netechma cuneifera =

Scientific classification
- Kingdom: Animalia
- Phylum: Arthropoda
- Clade: Pancrustacea
- Class: Insecta
- Order: Lepidoptera
- Family: Tortricidae
- Genus: Netechma
- Species: N. cuneifera

Binomial name
- Netechma cuneifera Razowski & Becker, 2002

Species of moth

Netechma cuneifera is a species of moth of the family Tortricidae. It is found in Carchi and Napo Provinces, Ecuador.

The wingspan is 17 millimetres (0.67 in) for males.
