= Idolatteria maon =

Scientific classification
- Domain: Eukaryota
- Kingdom: Animalia
- Phylum: Arthropoda
- Class: Insecta
- Order: Lepidoptera
- Family: Tortricidae
- Genus: Idolatteria
- Species: I. maon

Binomial name
- Idolatteria maon (H. Druce, 1901)

Synonyms
- Atteria maon H. Druce, 1901; Pseudatteria maon

Species of moth

Idolatteria maon is a species of moth of the family Tortricidae first described by Herbert Druce in 1901. It is found in Ecuador.
