= Idolatteria simulatrix =

Scientific classification
- Kingdom: Animalia
- Phylum: Arthropoda
- Class: Insecta
- Order: Lepidoptera
- Family: Tortricidae
- Genus: Idolatteria
- Species: I. simulatrix

Binomial name
- Idolatteria simulatrix Walsingham, 1914

Species of moth

Idolatteria simulatrix is a species of moth belonging to the Tortricidae family. It is found in Guatemala.

The wingspan is about 25 mm.
