= Toreulia nimia =

Scientific classification
- Kingdom: Animalia
- Phylum: Arthropoda
- Clade: Pancrustacea
- Class: Insecta
- Order: Lepidoptera
- Family: Tortricidae
- Genus: Toreulia
- Species: T. nimia

Binomial name
- Toreulia nimia Razowski & Becker, 2000

Species of moth

Toreulia nimia is a species of moth of the family Tortricidae. It is found in Ecuador in the provinces of Pichincha and Cotopaxi.

The wingspan is 21.5–32 mm.
