= Netechma sclerophracta =

Scientific classification
- Kingdom: Animalia
- Phylum: Arthropoda
- Class: Insecta
- Order: Lepidoptera
- Family: Tortricidae
- Genus: Netechma
- Species: N. sclerophracta

Binomial name
- Netechma sclerophracta (Meyrick, 1936)

Synonyms
- Eulia sclerophracta Meyrick, 1936

Species of moth

Netechma sclerophracta is a species of moth of the family Tortricidae. It is found in Venezuela.
