= Oregocerata zonalis =

Scientific classification
- Kingdom: Animalia
- Phylum: Arthropoda
- Clade: Pancrustacea
- Class: Insecta
- Order: Lepidoptera
- Family: Tortricidae
- Genus: Oregocerata
- Species: O. zonalis

Binomial name
- Oregocerata zonalis Razowski & Becker, 2002

Species of moth

Oregocerata zonalis is a species of moth of the family Tortricidae. It is found in Ecuador in the provinces of Loja and Bolivar.
