= Neopotamia armatana =

Scientific classification
- Domain: Eukaryota
- Kingdom: Animalia
- Phylum: Arthropoda
- Class: Insecta
- Order: Lepidoptera
- Family: Tortricidae
- Genus: Neopotamia
- Species: N. armatana

Binomial name
- Neopotamia armatana Kuznetzov, 1988

Species of moth

Neopotamia armatana is a moth of the family Tortricidae. It is found in Vietnam.
