= Galomecalpa parsoni =

Scientific classification
- Kingdom: Animalia
- Phylum: Arthropoda
- Class: Insecta
- Order: Lepidoptera
- Family: Tortricidae
- Genus: Galomecalpa
- Species: G. parsoni

Binomial name
- Galomecalpa parsoni Razowski & Pelz, 2006

Species of moth

Galomecalpa parsoni is a species of moth of the family Tortricidae. It is found in Ecuador (Pichincha Province) and Peru.

The wingspan is 25 millimetres (0.98 in).
