= Netechma phobetrovalva =

Scientific classification
- Kingdom: Animalia
- Phylum: Arthropoda
- Class: Insecta
- Order: Lepidoptera
- Family: Tortricidae
- Genus: Netechma
- Species: N. phobetrovalva

Binomial name
- Netechma phobetrovalva Razowski & Pelz, 2003

Species of moth

Netechma phobetrovalva is a species of moth of the family Tortricidae. It is found in Ecuador (Morona-Santiago Province).
