= Netechma technema =

Scientific classification
- Domain: Eukaryota
- Kingdom: Animalia
- Phylum: Arthropoda
- Class: Insecta
- Order: Lepidoptera
- Family: Tortricidae
- Genus: Netechma
- Species: N. technema

Binomial name
- Netechma technema (Walsingham, 1914)

Synonyms
- Tortrix technema Walsingham, 1914

Species of moth

Netechma technema is a species of moth of the family Tortricidae. It is found in Costa Rica.
