= Ernocornutia carycodes =

Scientific classification
- Kingdom: Animalia
- Phylum: Arthropoda
- Class: Insecta
- Order: Lepidoptera
- Family: Tortricidae
- Genus: Ernocornutia
- Species: E. carycodes

Binomial name
- Ernocornutia carycodes (Meyrick, 1926)

Synonyms
- Eulia carycodes Meyrick, 1926

Species of moth

Ernocornutia carycodes is a species of moth of the family Tortricidae. It is found in Colombia (Mount Tolima).
