= Ernocornutia =

Scientific classification
- Kingdom: Animalia
- Phylum: Arthropoda
- Class: Insecta
- Order: Lepidoptera
- Family: Tortricidae
- Tribe: Euliini
- Genus: Ernocornutia; Razowski, 1988

Species
- See text

Genus of tortrix moths

Ernocornutia is a genus of moths belonging to the family Tortricidae.

== Species ==
- Ernocornutia alpha Razowski & Wojtusiak, 2010
- Ernocornutia altonapoana Razowski & Wojtusiak, 2009
- Ernocornutia altovolans Razowski & Wojtusiak, 2010
- Ernocornutia basisignata Razowski & Wojtusiak, 2010
- Ernocornutia beta Razowski & Wojtusiak, 2010
- Ernocornutia capronata Razowski, 1988
- Ernocornutia carycodes (Meyrick, 1926)
- Ernocornutia catopta Razowski, 1988
- Ernocornutia chiribogana Razowski & Wojtusiak, 2008
- Ernocornutia firna Razowski & Wojtusiak, 2008
- Ernocornutia gualaceoana Razowski & Wojtusiak, 2006
- Ernocornutia lamna Razowski & Wojtusiak, 2010
- Ernocornutia limona Razowski & Wojtusiak, 2006
- Ernocornutia paracatopta Razowski & Wojtusiak, 2008
- Ernocornutia pilaloana Razowski & Wojtusiak, 2008
- Ernocornutia pululahuana Razowski & Wojtusiak, 2008
- Ernocornutia sangayana Razowski & Wojtusiak, 2008
- Ernocornutia termasiana Razowski & Wojtusiak, 2008
