= Ernocornutia catopta =

Scientific classification
- Domain: Eukaryota
- Kingdom: Animalia
- Phylum: Arthropoda
- Class: Insecta
- Order: Lepidoptera
- Family: Tortricidae
- Genus: Ernocornutia
- Species: E. catopta

Binomial name
- Ernocornutia catopta Razowski, 1988

Species of moth

Ernocornutia catopta is a species of moth of the family Tortricidae. It is found in Colombia.
