= Galomecalpa =

Scientific classification
- Kingdom: Animalia
- Phylum: Arthropoda
- Class: Insecta
- Order: Lepidoptera
- Family: Tortricidae
- Tribe: Euliini
- Genus: Galomecalpa; Razowski, 1990

Genus of tortrix moths

Galomecalpa is a genus of moths belonging to the family Tortricidae.

== Species ==
- Galomecalpa concolor Razowski & Pelz, 2006
- Galomecalpa defricata (Meyrick, 1926)
- Galomecalpa empirica Razowski & Becker, 2003
- Galomecalpa hydrochoa (Meyrick, 1930)
- Galomecalpa lesta Razowski & Pelz, 2013
- Galomecalpa majestica Razowski & Wojtusiak, 2013
- Galomecalpa megaloplaca (Meyrick, 1932)
- Galomecalpa meridana Razowski & Brown, 2004
- Galomecalpa minutuncus Razowski & Wojtusiak, 2008
- Galomecalpa monogramma (Razowski, 1997)
- Galomecalpa parsoni Razowski & Pelz, 2006
- Galomecalpa quatrofascia Razowski & Wojtusiak, 2009
- Galomecalpa secunda Razowski & Becker, 2002
- Galomecalpa suffusca Razowski & Pelz, 2006
- Galomecalpa tamaria Razowski & Wojtusiak, 2013
- Galomecalpa tingomaria Razowski & Wojtusiak, 2010

== Habitat ==
The habitat consists of cloud forests at altitudes ranging from 1,200 to 2,800 meters.

== Distribution ==
The genus is found in Venezuela, Peru, Colombia, Ecuador and Bolivia.

== See also ==
- List of Tortricidae genera
