= Netechma setosa =

Scientific classification
- Kingdom: Animalia
- Phylum: Arthropoda
- Class: Insecta
- Order: Lepidoptera
- Family: Tortricidae
- Genus: Netechma
- Species: N. setosa

Binomial name
- Netechma setosa (Meyrick, 1917)

Synonyms
- Cnephasia setosa Meyrick, 1917

Species of moth

Netechma setosa is a species of moth of the family Tortricidae. It is found in Colombia.
