= Clarkenia basilinea =

Scientific classification
- Kingdom: Animalia
- Phylum: Arthropoda
- Clade: Pancrustacea
- Class: Insecta
- Order: Lepidoptera
- Family: Tortricidae
- Genus: Clarkenia
- Species: C. basilinea

Binomial name
- Clarkenia basilinea Razowski & Becker, 2001

Species of moth

Clarkenia basilinea is a species of moth of the family Tortricidae. It is found in Ecuador (Loja Province).
