= Bidorpitia dictyophanes =

Scientific classification
- Kingdom: Animalia
- Phylum: Arthropoda
- Class: Insecta
- Order: Lepidoptera
- Family: Tortricidae
- Genus: Bidorpitia
- Species: B. dictyophanes

Binomial name
- Bidorpitia dictyophanes (Meyrick, 1926)

Synonyms
- Eulia dictyophanes Meyrick, 1926

Species of moth

Bidorpitia dictyophanes is a species of moth of the family Tortricidae. It is found in Colombia.
