= Netechma neanica =

Scientific classification
- Kingdom: Animalia
- Phylum: Arthropoda
- Clade: Pancrustacea
- Class: Insecta
- Order: Lepidoptera
- Family: Tortricidae
- Genus: Netechma
- Species: N. neanica

Binomial name
- Netechma neanica (Razowski & Becker, 1986)

Synonyms
- Saphenista neanica Razowski & Becker, 1986

Species of moth

Netechma neanica is a species of moth of the family Tortricidae. It is found in Veracruz, Mexico.
