= Rhythmologa numerata =

Scientific classification
- Kingdom: Animalia
- Phylum: Arthropoda
- Class: Insecta
- Order: Lepidoptera
- Family: Tortricidae
- Genus: Rhythmologa
- Species: R. numerata

Binomial name
- Rhythmologa numerata Meyrick, 1926

Species of moth

Rhythmologa numerata is a species of moth of the family Tortricidae. It is found in Colombia and Tungurahua Province, Ecuador.
