= Punctapinella paratheta =

Scientific classification
- Kingdom: Animalia
- Phylum: Arthropoda
- Class: Insecta
- Order: Lepidoptera
- Family: Tortricidae
- Genus: Punctapinella
- Species: P. paratheta

Binomial name
- Punctapinella paratheta Razowski & Pelz, 2003

Species of moth

Punctapinella paratheta is a species of moth of the family Tortricidae. It is found in Morona-Santiago Province, Ecuador.
