= Netechma gibberosa =

Scientific classification
- Kingdom: Animalia
- Phylum: Arthropoda
- Clade: Pancrustacea
- Class: Insecta
- Order: Lepidoptera
- Family: Tortricidae
- Genus: Netechma
- Species: N. gibberosa

Binomial name
- Netechma gibberosa Razowski & Becker, 2002

Species of moth

Netechma gibberosa is a species of moth of the family Tortricidae. It is found in Tungurahua Province, Ecuador.

The wingspan is 22 millimetres (0.87 in) for the holotype, a male.
