= Netechma delicta =

Scientific classification
- Kingdom: Animalia
- Phylum: Arthropoda
- Class: Insecta
- Order: Lepidoptera
- Family: Tortricidae
- Genus: Netechma
- Species: N. delicta

Binomial name
- Netechma delicta (Razowski, 1997)

Synonyms
- Icteralaria delicta Razowski, 1997

Species of moth

Netechma delicta is a species of moth of the family Tortricidae. It is found in Peru.
