= Toreulia torrens =

Scientific classification
- Kingdom: Animalia
- Phylum: Arthropoda
- Clade: Pancrustacea
- Class: Insecta
- Order: Lepidoptera
- Family: Tortricidae
- Genus: Toreulia
- Species: T. torrens

Binomial name
- Toreulia torrens Razowski & Becker, 2000

Species of moth

Toreulia torrens is a species of moth of the family Tortricidae. It is found in Carchi Province, Ecuador.

The forewings are mostly orange rust coloured.
