= Punctapinella scleroductus =

Scientific classification
- Domain: Eukaryota
- Kingdom: Animalia
- Phylum: Arthropoda
- Class: Insecta
- Order: Lepidoptera
- Family: Tortricidae
- Genus: Punctapinella
- Species: P. scleroductus

Binomial name
- Punctapinella scleroductus Brown, 1991

Species of moth

Punctapinella scleroductus is a species of moth of the family Tortricidae. It is found in Rio de Janeiro, Brazil.
