= Rhythmologa =

Scientific classification
- Kingdom: Animalia
- Phylum: Arthropoda
- Class: Insecta
- Order: Lepidoptera
- Family: Tortricidae
- Tribe: Euliini
- Genus: Rhythmologa; Meyrick, 1926

Synonyms
- Rhytmologa Razowski, 1997

Genus of tortrix moths

Rhythmologa is a genus of moths belonging to the subfamily Tortricinae of the family Tortricidae.

== Species ==
- Rhythmologa argentoviridana Razowski & Wojtusiak, 2008
- Rhythmologa bicuspis Razowski & Wojtusiak, 2010
- Rhythmologa numerata Meyrick, 1926
- Rhythmologa polyfenestra Razowski & Wojtusiak, 2009
- Rhythmologa yukipana Razowski & Pelz, 2003

== See also ==
- List of Tortricidae genera
