= Tsinilla =

Scientific classification
- Kingdom: Animalia
- Phylum: Arthropoda
- Class: Insecta
- Order: Lepidoptera
- Family: Tortricidae
- Tribe: Olethreutini
- Genus: Tsinilla; Heinrich, 1931

Genus of tortrix moths

Tsinilla is a genus of moths belonging to the subfamily Olethreutinae of the family Tortricidae.

== Species ==
- Tsinilla albidecora Razowski & Wojtusiak, 2008
- Tsinilla lineana (Fernald, 1901)
- Tsinilla pallidipuncta Razowski & Wojtusiak, 2010
- Tsinilla stenuncus Razowski & Wojtusiak, 2010
- Tsinilla tristis Razowski & Wojtusiak, 2008
- Tsinilla ubericolor Razowski & Wojtusiak, 2008
- Tsinilla unciphrona Razowski & Wojtusiak, 2011

== See also ==
- List of Tortricidae genera
