= Clarkenia =

Scientific classification
- Kingdom: Animalia
- Phylum: Arthropoda
- Class: Insecta
- Order: Lepidoptera
- Family: Tortricidae
- Subfamily: Tortricinae
- Tribe: Euliini
- Genus: Clarkenia; Razowski, 1988

Species
- See text

Genus of tortrix moths

Clarkenia is a genus of moths belonging to the family Tortricidae.

== Species ==
- Clarkenia basilinea Razowski & Becker, 2001
- Clarkenia cantamen Razowski & Becker, 2002
- Clarkenia miramundi Razowski, 1988
- Clarkenia nivescens (Meyrick, 1926)
- Clarkenia pantherina Razowski & Wojtusiak, 2009
- Clarkenia superba Razowski, 1988
- Clarkenia triangulifera Razowski & Wojtusiak, 2008
