= Bidorpitia cryptica =

Scientific classification
- Kingdom: Animalia
- Phylum: Arthropoda
- Clade: Pancrustacea
- Class: Insecta
- Order: Lepidoptera
- Family: Tortricidae
- Genus: Bidorpitia
- Species: B. cryptica

Binomial name
- Bidorpitia cryptica Brown, in Brown & Powell, 1991

Species of moth

Bidorpitia cryptica is a species of moth of the family Tortricidae. It is found in Venezuela.
