= Netechma caesiata =

Scientific classification
- Domain: Eukaryota
- Kingdom: Animalia
- Phylum: Arthropoda
- Class: Insecta
- Order: Lepidoptera
- Family: Tortricidae
- Genus: Netechma
- Species: N. caesiata

Binomial name
- Netechma caesiata (Clarke, 1968)

Synonyms
- Cochylis caesiata Clarke, 1968

Species of moth

Netechma caesiata is a species of moth of the family Tortricidae. It is found in Venezuela.

The wingspan is 10–12 mm. The ground colour of the forewings is buff, the basal two-fifths clouded with clay. The hindwings are ocherous white basally, followed by a greyish fuscous band. The subterminal and apical areas are light tawny.
