= Galomecalpa secunda =

Scientific classification
- Kingdom: Animalia
- Phylum: Arthropoda
- Clade: Pancrustacea
- Class: Insecta
- Order: Lepidoptera
- Family: Tortricidae
- Genus: Galomecalpa
- Species: G. secunda

Binomial name
- Galomecalpa secunda Razowski & Becker, 2002

Synonyms
- Galomecalpa secunda Razowski & Becker, 2003

Species of moth

Galomecalpa secunda is a species of moth of the family Tortricidae. It is found in Ecuador (Morona-Santiago Province) and Peru.
