= Netechma niveonigra =

Scientific classification
- Kingdom: Animalia
- Phylum: Arthropoda
- Clade: Pancrustacea
- Class: Insecta
- Order: Lepidoptera
- Family: Tortricidae
- Genus: Netechma
- Species: N. niveonigra

Binomial name
- Netechma niveonigra Razowski & Becker, 2002

Species of moth

Netechma niveonigra is a species of moth of the family Tortricidae. It is found in Loja Province, Ecuador.

The wingspan is 19 millimetres (0.75 in).
