= Netechma pyrrhodelta =

Scientific classification
- Kingdom: Animalia
- Phylum: Arthropoda
- Clade: Pancrustacea
- Class: Insecta
- Order: Lepidoptera
- Family: Tortricidae
- Genus: Netechma
- Species: N. pyrrhodelta

Binomial name
- Netechma pyrrhodelta (Meyrick, 1931)

Synonyms
- Euxanthis pyrrhodelta Meyrick, 1931

Species of moth

Netechma pyrrhodelta is a species of moth of the family Tortricidae. It is found in Costa Rica.
