= Netechma epicremna =

Scientific classification
- Kingdom: Animalia
- Phylum: Arthropoda
- Class: Insecta
- Order: Lepidoptera
- Family: Tortricidae
- Genus: Netechma
- Species: N. epicremna

Binomial name
- Netechma epicremna (Meyrick, 1926)

Synonyms
- Eulia epicremna Meyrick, 1926

Species of moth

Netechma epicremna is a species of moth of the family Tortricidae. It is found in Colombia.
