= Idolatteria pyropis =

Scientific classification
- Kingdom: Animalia
- Phylum: Arthropoda
- Class: Insecta
- Order: Lepidoptera
- Family: Tortricidae
- Genus: Idolatteria
- Species: I. pyropis

Binomial name
- Idolatteria pyropis Walsingham, 1914

Species of moth

Idolatteria pyropis is a species of moth of the family Tortricidae. It is found in Costa Rica.

The wingspan is about 29 millimetres (1.1 in). The forewings are deep orange, the costa and termen alternately marked with dark purple and yellowish white, the purple assuming a more reddish tinge where it encroaches on the orange ground colour. There is a series of nine costal, one apical and six or seven terminal streaks. The hindwings are reddish orange, spotted with purplish fuscous throughout.
