= Punctapinella niphastra =

Scientific classification
- Kingdom: Animalia
- Phylum: Arthropoda
- Class: Insecta
- Order: Lepidoptera
- Family: Tortricidae
- Genus: Punctapinella
- Species: P. niphastra

Binomial name
- Punctapinella niphastra (Meyrick, 1931)

Synonyms
- Eulia niphastra Meyrick, 1931

Species of moth

Punctapinella niphastra is a species of moth of the family Tortricidae. It is found in Espírito Santo, Brazil.
