= Netechma magna =

Scientific classification
- Kingdom: Animalia
- Phylum: Arthropoda
- Clade: Pancrustacea
- Class: Insecta
- Order: Lepidoptera
- Family: Tortricidae
- Genus: Netechma
- Species: N. magna

Binomial name
- Netechma magna Razowski & Becker, 2001

Species of moth

Netechma magna is a species of moth of the family Tortricidae. It is found in Loja Province, Ecuador.
