= Neopotamia divisa =

Scientific classification
- Domain: Eukaryota
- Kingdom: Animalia
- Phylum: Arthropoda
- Class: Insecta
- Order: Lepidoptera
- Family: Tortricidae
- Genus: Neopotamia
- Species: N. divisa

Binomial name
- Neopotamia divisa (Walsingham, 1900)

Synonyms
- Phaecadophora divisa Walsingham, 1900; Argyroploce acrosema Meyrick, 1909

Species of moth

Neopotamia divisa is a moth of the family Tortricidae. It is found in India, Thailand and Vietnam.
