= Netechma =

Scientific classification
- Kingdom: Animalia
- Phylum: Arthropoda
- Clade: Pancrustacea
- Class: Insecta
- Order: Lepidoptera
- Family: Tortricidae
- Subfamily: Tortricinae
- Genus: Netechma; Razowski, 1992

Type species
- Tortrix technemu Walsingham, 1914

Genus of tortrix moths

Netechma is a genus of moths of the family Tortricidae.

== Species ==
- Netechma albitermen Razowski & Wojtusiak, 2008
- Netechma altitudinaria Razowski & Wojtusiak, 2008
- Netechma altobrasiliana Razowski & Becker, 2001
- Netechma anterofascia Razowski & Wojtusiak, 2010
- Netechma atemeles (Razowski, 1997)
- Netechma bicerithium (Razowski, 1997)
- Netechma bifascia Razowski & Wojtusiak, 2008
- Netechma brevidagus Razowski & Wojtusiak, 2010
- Netechma brunneochra Razowski & Wojtusiak, 2006
- Netechma caesiata (Clarke, 1968)
- Netechma cajanumae Razowski & Wojtusiak, 2008
- Netechma camelana Razowski & Wojtusiak, 2008
- Netechma cerusata Razowski, 1999
- Netechma chamaecera Razowski & Becker, 2001
- Netechma chytrostium Razowski & Wojtusiak, 2006
- Netechma consequens Razowski, 1999
- Netechma consimilis Razowski & Becker, 2002
- Netechma cordillerana Razowski & Wojtusiak, 2011
- Netechma crucifera Razowski & Wojtusiak, 2008
- Netechma cuneifera Razowski & Becker, 2002
- Netechma delicta (Razowski, 1997)
- Netechma dentata (Meyrick, 1917)
- Netechma distincta Razowski & Becker, 2001
- Netechma divisoriae Razowski, 1999
- Netechma egens Razowski, 1999
- Netechma enucleata Razowski, 1999
- Netechma epicremna (Meyrick, 1926)
- Netechma eurychlora (Meyrick, 1926)
- Netechma fausta Razowski & Becker, 2001
- Netechma formosa Razowski & Becker, 2001
- Netechma furcularia (Razowski, 1997)
- Netechma gibberosa Razowski & Becker, 2002
- Netechma gilvoniveana Razowski & Wojtusiak, 2010
- Netechma gnathocera Razowski & Wojtusiak, 2006
- Netechma graphitaspis Razowski & Becker, 2001
- Netechma guamotea Razowski & Wojtusiak, 2009
- Netechma illecebrosa Razowski & Becker, 2001
- Netechma indanzana Razowski & Becker, 2001
- Netechma insignata Razowski & Becker, 2001
- Netechma jelskii Razowski & Wojtusiak, 2008
- Netechma labyrinthica Razowski & Becker, 2001
- Netechma lacera (Razowski, 1997)
- Netechma lamanana Razowski & Wojtusiak, 2008
- Netechma lojana Razowski & Becker, 2001
- Netechma luteopoecila Razowski & Becker, 2001
- Netechma magna Razowski & Becker, 2001
- Netechma miradora Razowski, 1999
- Netechma moderata Razowski & Becker, 2001
- Netechma modesta (Razowski, 1997)
- Netechma napoana Razowski & Wojtusiak, 2009
- Netechma neanica (Razowski & Becker, 1986)
- Netechma nigralba Razowski & Becker, 2001
- Netechma nigricunea Razowski & Wojtusiak, 2006
- Netechma niveonigra Razowski & Becker, 2002
- Netechma notabilis Razowski & Becker, 2001
- Netechma obunca Razowski & Wojtusiak, 2008
- Netechma ochrata Razowski & Becker, 2001
- Netechma ochrotona Razowski & Pelz, 2003
- Netechma oppressa (Meyrick, 1926)
- Netechma otongana Razowski & Wojtusiak, 2008
- Netechma paralojana Razowski & Wojtusiak, 2006
- Netechma parindanzana Razowski & Wojtusiak, 2010
- Netechma pecuniosa Razowski & Wojtusiak, 2010
- Netechma phaedroma Razowski & Becker, 2001
- Netechma phobetrovalva Razowski & Pelz, 2003
- Netechma picta Razowski & Becker, 2001
- Netechma polycornuta Razowski & Wojtusiak, 2008
- Netechma polyspinea Razowski & Becker, 2001
- Netechma praecipua (Meyrick, 1917)
- Netechma projuncta Razowski, 1999
- Netechma pyrrhocolona (Meyrick, 1926)
- Netechma pyrrhodelta (Meyrick, 1931)
- Netechma quatropuncta Razowski & Wojtusiak, 2010
- Netechma saccata Razowski & Wojtusiak, 2010
- Netechma sclerophracta (Meyrick, 1936)
- Netechma sectionalis (Meyrick, 1932)
- Netechma selecta Razowski & Pelz, 2003
- Netechma setosa (Meyrick, 1917)
- Netechma similis Brown & Adamski, 2002
- Netechma simulans Razowski & Wojtusiak, 2009
- Netechma spinea Razowski, 1999
- Netechma splendida Razowski & Wojtusiak, 2008
- Netechma sulphurica Razowski, 1999
- Netechma technema (Walsingham, 1914)
- Netechma tenuifascia Razowski & Wojtusiak, 2009
- Netechma triangulina Razowski, 1999
- Netechma triangulum Razowski & Wojtusiak, 2006
- Netechma zemiotes Razowski & Wojtusiak, 2010

== See also ==
- List of Tortricidae genera
