= Thalleulia gracilescens =

Scientific classification
- Kingdom: Animalia
- Phylum: Arthropoda
- Class: Insecta
- Order: Lepidoptera
- Family: Tortricidae
- Genus: Thalleulia
- Species: T. gracilescens

Binomial name
- Thalleulia gracilescens Razowski, 2004

Species of moth

Thalleulia gracilescens is a species of moth of the family Tortricidae. It is found in Pichincha Province, Ecuador.

The wingspan is about 17.5 mm.
