= Punctapinella conchitis =

Scientific classification
- Kingdom: Animalia
- Phylum: Arthropoda
- Class: Insecta
- Order: Lepidoptera
- Family: Tortricidae
- Genus: Punctapinella
- Species: P. conchitis

Binomial name
- Punctapinella conchitis (Meyrick, 1912)

Synonyms
- Eulia conchitis Meyrick, 1912

Species of moth

Punctapinella conchitis is a species of moth of the family Tortricidae. It is found in Colombia.
