= Neopotamia formosa =

Scientific classification
- Kingdom: Animalia
- Phylum: Arthropoda
- Class: Insecta
- Order: Lepidoptera
- Family: Tortricidae
- Genus: Neopotamia
- Species: N. formosa

Binomial name
- Neopotamia formosa Kawabe, 1989

Species of moth

Neopotamia cathemacta is a moth of the family Tortricidae. It is found in Thailand and Taiwan.
