= Janusz Wojtusiak =

Polish entomologist

Janusz R. Wojtusiak
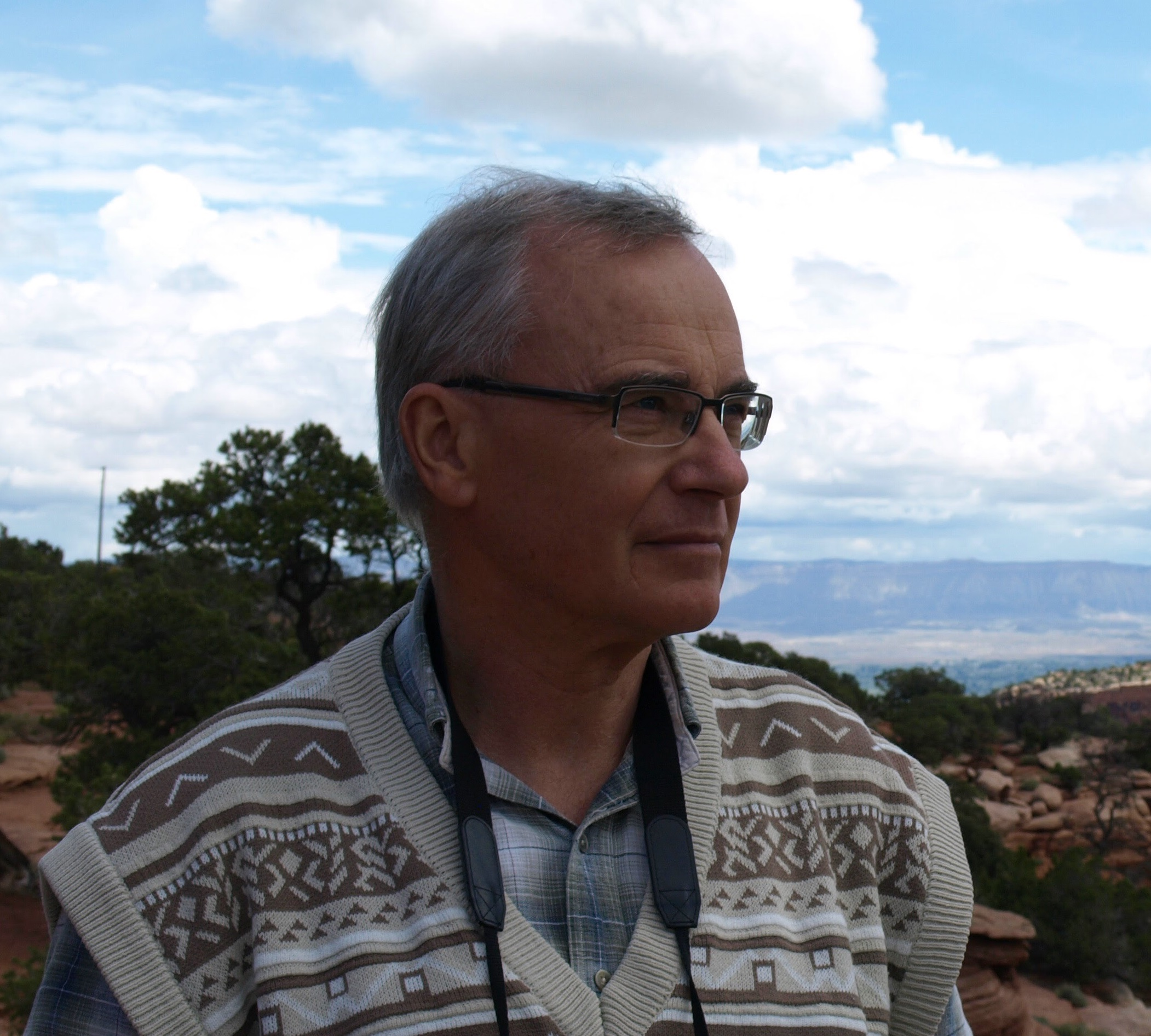
- Born: February 21, 1942; Kraków, Poland
- Died: April 2, 2012 (aged 70); Kraków, Poland
- Scientific career
- Fields: Entomology
- Workplaces: Jagiellonian University; University of Nigeria

Janusz R. Wojtusiak (February 21, 1942 – May 2, 2012) was a Polish entomologist and son of the well-known Polish biologist, Roman Wojtusiak, Professor at the Jagiellonian University.

He presented his Ph.D. thesis in 1971. It concerned the morphology of the family Adelidae.

In 1994, he received a professorial nomination from the President of the Republic of Poland, Lech Wałęsa.
