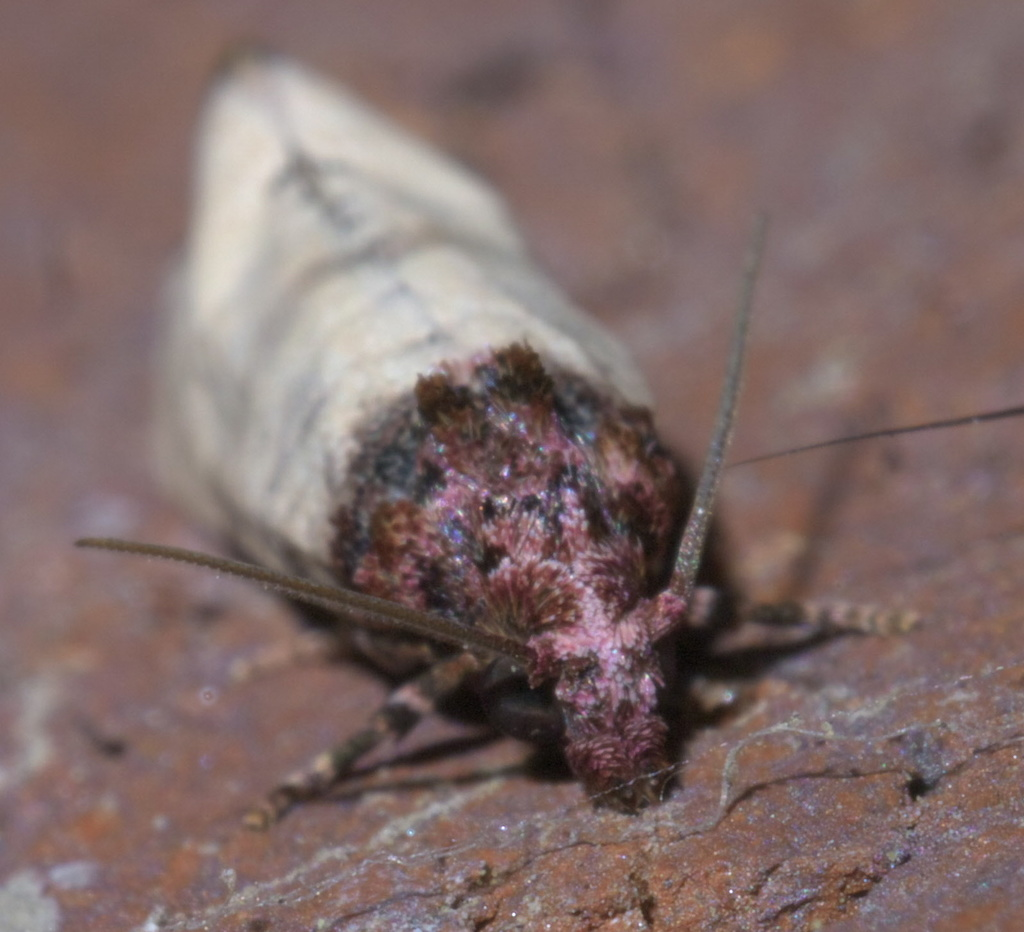

Scientific classification
- Kingdom: Animalia
- Phylum: Arthropoda
- Clade: Pancrustacea
- Class: Insecta
- Order: Lepidoptera
- Family: Tortricidae
- Genus: Phalonidia
- Species: P. lavana

Binomial name
- Phalonidia lavana (Busck, 1907)

Synonyms
- Phalonia lavana Busck, 1907; Platphalonia lavana Metzler & Albu, 2013 (Inactive); Platphalonidia lavana Razowski, 1997

= Phalonidia lavana =

Species of moth

Phalonidia lavana, or Platphalonidia lavana, is a species of moth of the family Tortricidae, the subfamily Tortricinae, and the tribe Cochylini. It has a terrestrial habitat and is found throughout North America. It does not have a Global Conservation Status Rank.

== Description ==
Hodges Number: 3833, 3834 in the 1983 Hodges checklist. Busck lists the wingspan as 12–13mm, while Razowksi lists it as 14–16mm.

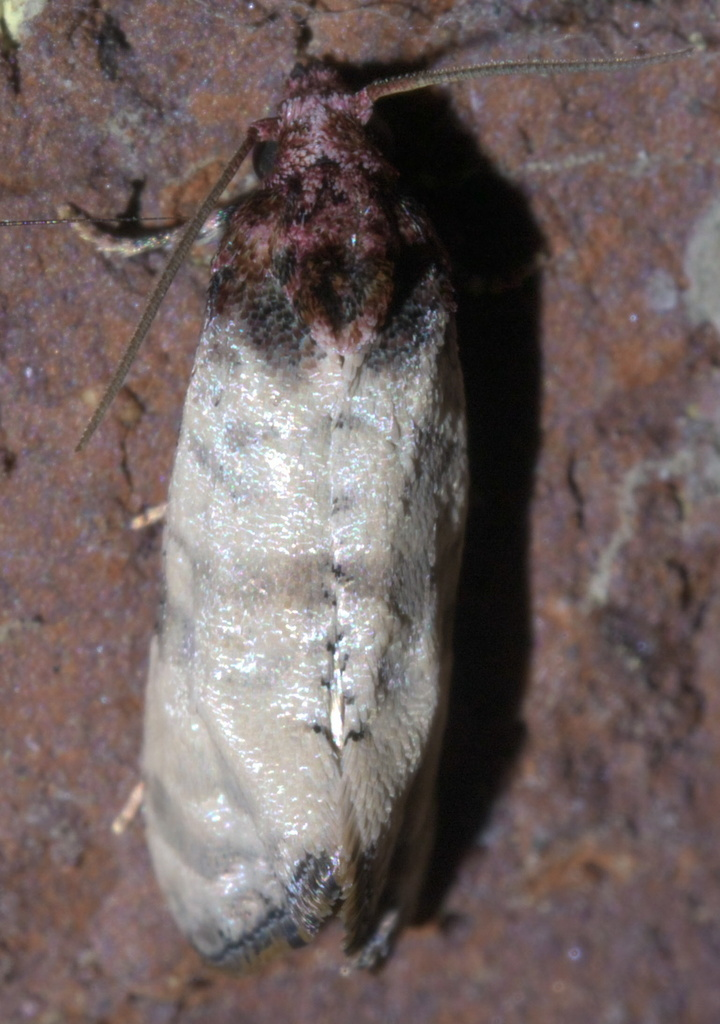
Top view of P. lavana

=== Original description ===
From Busck, 1907, sp.n.:

Labial palpi white, shaded with light fuscous. Face and head dirty white. Thorax light fuscous. Fore wings silvery white, mottled and marked with black and brown. Costal edge is tinged with brown, especially at base marked with about sixteen equidistant small black streaks from base to apex. On the middle of the wing three of these streaks are combined into a larger spot by intervening dark brown scales, and from the spot is emitted an indistinct, poorly defined brown shade across the wing. Basal third of the wing is nearly unmottled, but the apical part is somewhat darkened by irregular black striation. The apical two-thirds of the dorsal edge is also marked with small black streaks and the tip of the wing is strongly mottled with black and brown scales. Hind wings whitish silvery fuscous. Abdomen dark fuscous. Legs, whitish; anterior tarsal joints annulated with black.

=== 1997 redescription ===
When Razowski transferred P. lavana to the Platphalonidia genus in 1997, he redescribed the species:

Wingspan 14–16mm. Head brownish grey with pink-violet hue and some black scales; labial palpus 2; thorax concolorous with head. Forewing in male expanding terminally, slightly so in female. Ground-colour creamy white, with olive hue, strigulated grey; blackish dots along costa and dorsum; diffuse grey fasciae in distal half of wing, scaled back towards apex. Median fascia olive brown-grey, divided into large dorsal part broadest at middle of wing and smaller costal part. Fringes whitish suffused grey or blackish. Hindwing white-grey, fringes whitish with grey basal line.

Variation. Pattern often ill-defined, occasionally darker in apical area [than] in middle, or median fascia reduced to a blackish dorsal blotch.

The only Canadian specimen has whitish ground-colour indistinctly but densely strigulated olive-grey, blackish suffusion of wing base, ferruginous, edged black dorsal blotch followed by grey costal mark.

Male genitalia of Canadian specimens: Valva broad basally, then strongly tapering terminad; sacculus broad, rounded ventrally; median part of transtilla very slender, with small apical thorns; aedeagus distinctly bent; cornutus slender, straight.

Female genitalia of the type specimen characterizes with well sclerotized, rather short cup-shaped sclerite of sterigma and short ductus bursae provided with longitudinal sclerites.

For a key to the terms used, see Glossary of entomology terms.

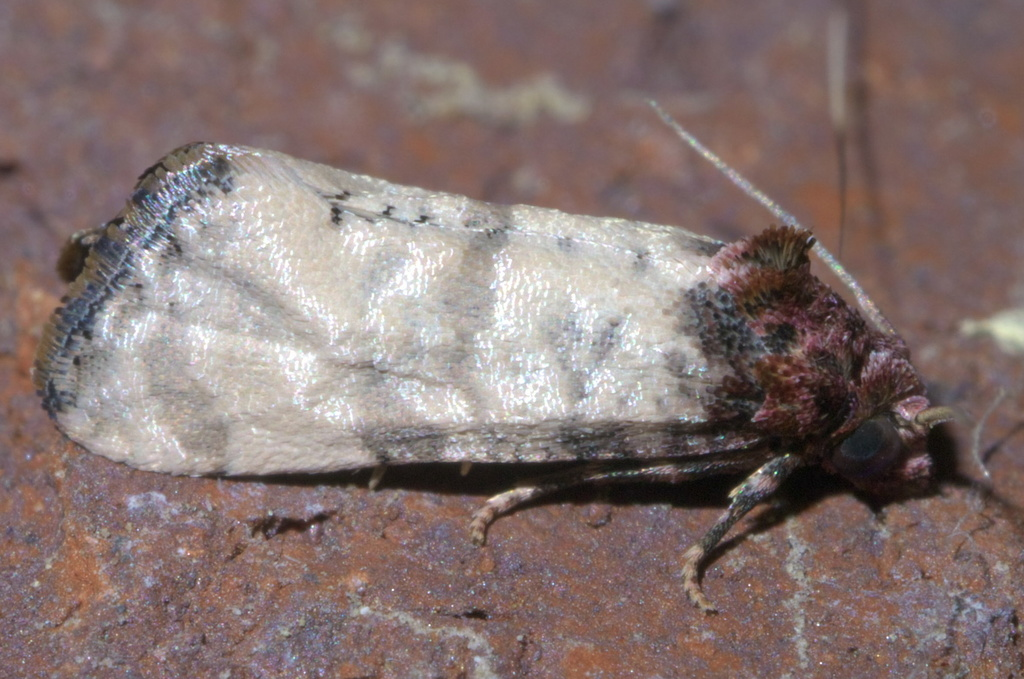
Side view of P. lavana

== Occurrences ==
Adult P. lavana have been recorded from April to September, most commonly occurring from May to July. Most of its occurrences have been during the past 10 years, with regular occurrences beginning in 2005. Throughout North America, P. lavana have been observed from Alberta, Arkansas, British Columbia, California, Colorado, Florida, Illinois, Iowa, Kentucky, Missouri, Nebraska, New Jersey, Ohio, Oklahoma, Pennsylvania, and Quebec.

P. lavana occurrences have been recorded via the International Barcode of Life Project (iBOL), iNaturalist, the Centre for Biodiversity Genomics, the Mississippi Entomological Museum, and the NMNH Extant Specimen Records. There are 10 specimen records listed publicly on the Barcode of Life Data System (BOLD), all of which were collected from middle North America.

=== Mobility and migration ===
- Colonial Breeder: No
- Non-Migrant: No
- Locally Migrant: No
- Long Distance Migrant: No

== Taxonomical history ==
Phalonia lavana was the original taxon, as described by Busck in 1907. In 1997, Razowski classified P. lavana under the Phalonidia genus and concluded that the type-locality is Tucson (Arizona, US).

Platphalonidia was synonymized with Phalonia when Razowski transferred P. felix to the Phalonidia genus in 2011: "Platphalonidia was described for Phalonia felix (Walsingham, 1895) and over 10 other species from the New World. Unfortunately the type-species belongs to Phalonidia and differs from the remaining New World species." Only P. felix was officially moved; the rest were moved to Platphalonia. As of 2015, Tortricid.net has those species placed in Phalonidia; currently, Phalonia is a synonym of Aethes and is no longer used to describe the Phalonidia genus. Furthermore, iNaturalist currently classifies the Platphalonia lavana taxon as inactive.

== Similar species ==
- Acleris albicomana (Clemens, 1865)
- Acleris cervinana (Fernald, 1882)
- Acleris chalybeana (Fernald, 1882)
- Acleris cornana (McDunnough, 1933)
- Acleris curvalana (Kearfott, 1907)
- Acleris flavivittana (Clemens, 1864)
- Acleris negundana (Busck, 1940)
- Acleris ptychogrammos (Zeller, 1875)
- Acleris semiannula (Robinson, 1869)
- Acleris subnivana (Walker, 1863)
- Aethes biscana (Kearfott, 1907)
- Aethes rana (Busck, 1907)
- Ancylis divisana (Walker, 1863)
- Argyrotaenia juglandana (Fernald, 1879)
- Argyrotaenia mariana (Fernald, 1882)
- Choristoneura parallela (Robinson, 1869)
- Cochylichroa hoffmanana (Kearfott, 1907)
- Cochylichroa temerana (Busck, 1907)
- Endothenia hebesana (Walker, 1863)
- Eumarozia malachitana (Zeller, 1875)
- Gymnandrosoma punctidiscanum (Dyar, 1904)
- Larisa subsolana (Miller, 1978)
- Pammene felicitana (Heinrich, 1923)
- Phtheochroa baracana (Busck, 1907)
- Sonia constrictana (Zeller, 1875)
- Sonia paraplesiana (Blanchard, 1979)
- Sparganothis chambersana (Kearfott, 1907)
- Sparganothis mesospila (Zeller, 1875)
- Sparganothis tristriata (Kearfott, 1907)
- Sparganothis xanthoides (Walker, 1863)
