= Sparganothis taracana =

Scientific classification
- Kingdom: Animalia
- Phylum: Arthropoda
- Clade: Pancrustacea
- Class: Insecta
- Order: Lepidoptera
- Family: Tortricidae
- Genus: Sparganothis
- Species: S. taracana

Binomial name
- Sparganothis taracana Kearfott, 1907

Synonyms
- Sparganothis procax Meyrick, 1912

Species of moth

Sparganothis taracana is a species of moth in the family Tortricidae. It is found in the United States, including Florida, South Carolina and Texas.

The wingspan is 13–17 mm.
