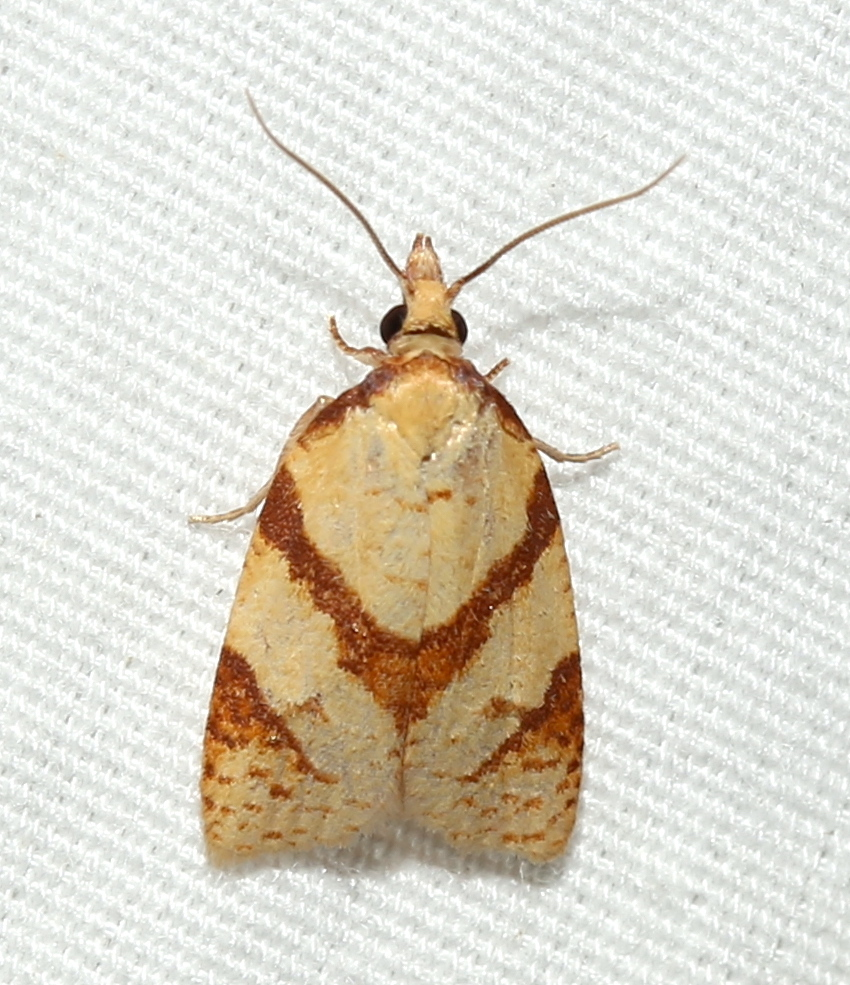

Scientific classification
- Kingdom: Animalia
- Phylum: Arthropoda
- Class: Insecta
- Order: Lepidoptera
- Family: Tortricidae
- Genus: Sparganothis
- Species: S. karacana

Binomial name
- Sparganothis karacana (Kearfott, 1907)

Synonyms
- Cenopis karacana Kearfott, 1907; Cenopis tempestiva Meyrick, 1912

= Sparganothis karacana =

Species of moth

Sparganothis karacana is a species of moth of the family Tortricidae. It is found in the United States, including Alabama, Arkansas, Florida, Indiana, Massachusetts, Mississippi, New Jersey, New York and Ohio.

The wingspan is 17–20 mm.
