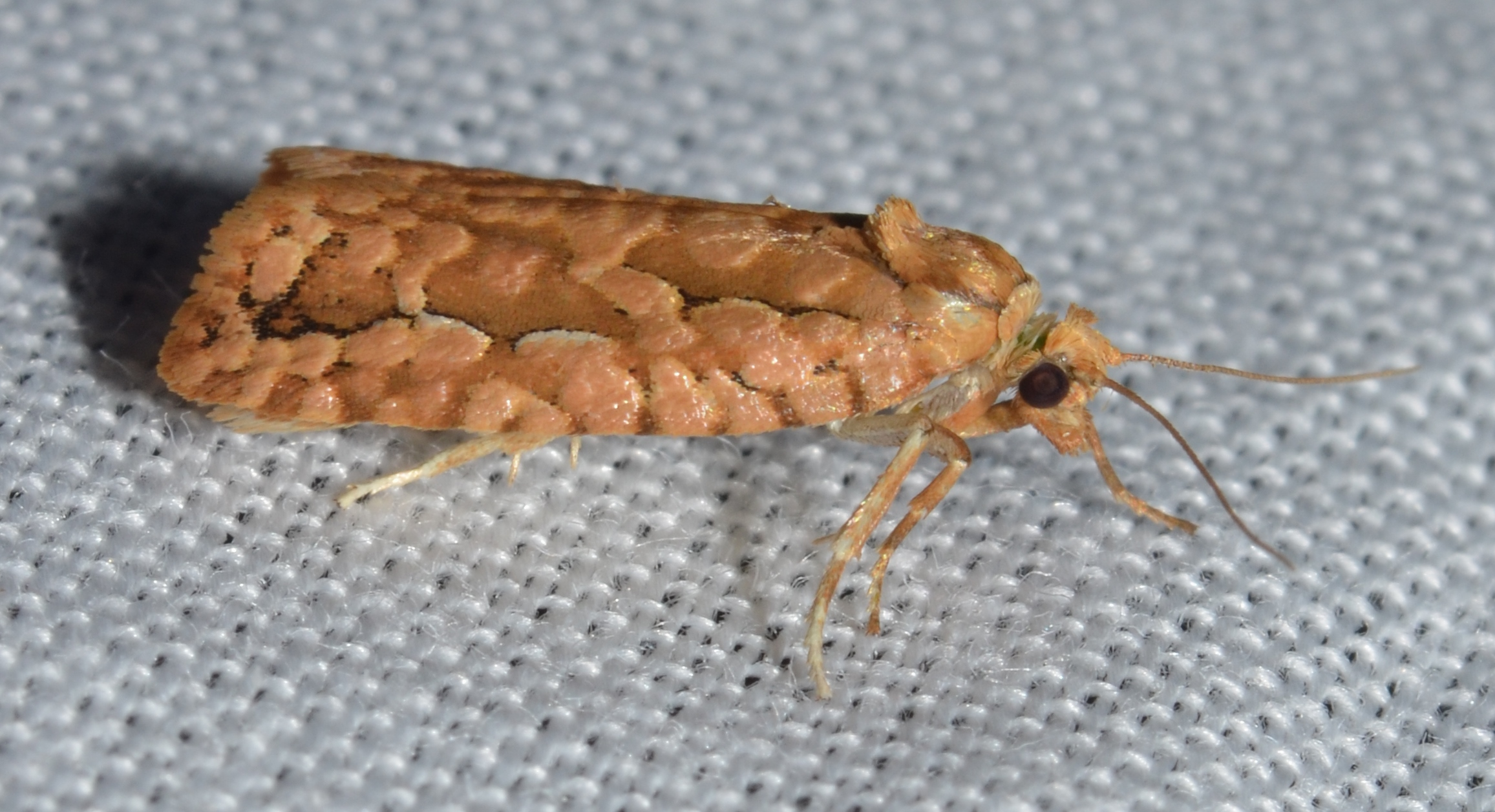

Scientific classification
- Kingdom: Animalia
- Phylum: Arthropoda
- Clade: Pancrustacea
- Class: Insecta
- Order: Lepidoptera
- Family: Tortricidae
- Genus: Diedra
- Species: D. cockerellana

Binomial name
- Diedra cockerellana (Kearfott, 1907)

Synonyms
- Tortrix cockerellana Kearfott, 1907; Argyrotaenia cockerellana

= Diedra cockerellana =

Species of moth

Diedra cockerellana, Cockerell's moth, is a species of moth of the family Tortricidae. It is found in North America, where it has been recorded from California, Colorado, Illinois, Indiana, Iowa, New Mexico, Ontario, Utah and Wisconsin.

The moth is about 18–22 mm. Adults have been recorded on wing from July to October.
