= Sparganothis vocaridorsana =

Scientific classification
- Domain: Eukaryota
- Kingdom: Animalia
- Phylum: Arthropoda
- Class: Insecta
- Order: Lepidoptera
- Family: Tortricidae
- Genus: Sparganothis
- Species: S. vocaridorsana

Binomial name
- Sparganothis vocaridorsana (Kearfott, 1905)

Synonyms
- Sparganothis puitana var. vocaridorsana Kearfott, 1905

Species of moth

Sparganothis vocaridorsana is a species of moth of the family Tortricidae. It is found in North America, including Alberta, British Columbia, Colorado, Idaho, Manitoba, Montana, New Mexico, the Northwest Territory, Oregon, Quebec, Saskatchewan, Utah, Washington and Wyoming.

The wingspan is 21–27 mm.
