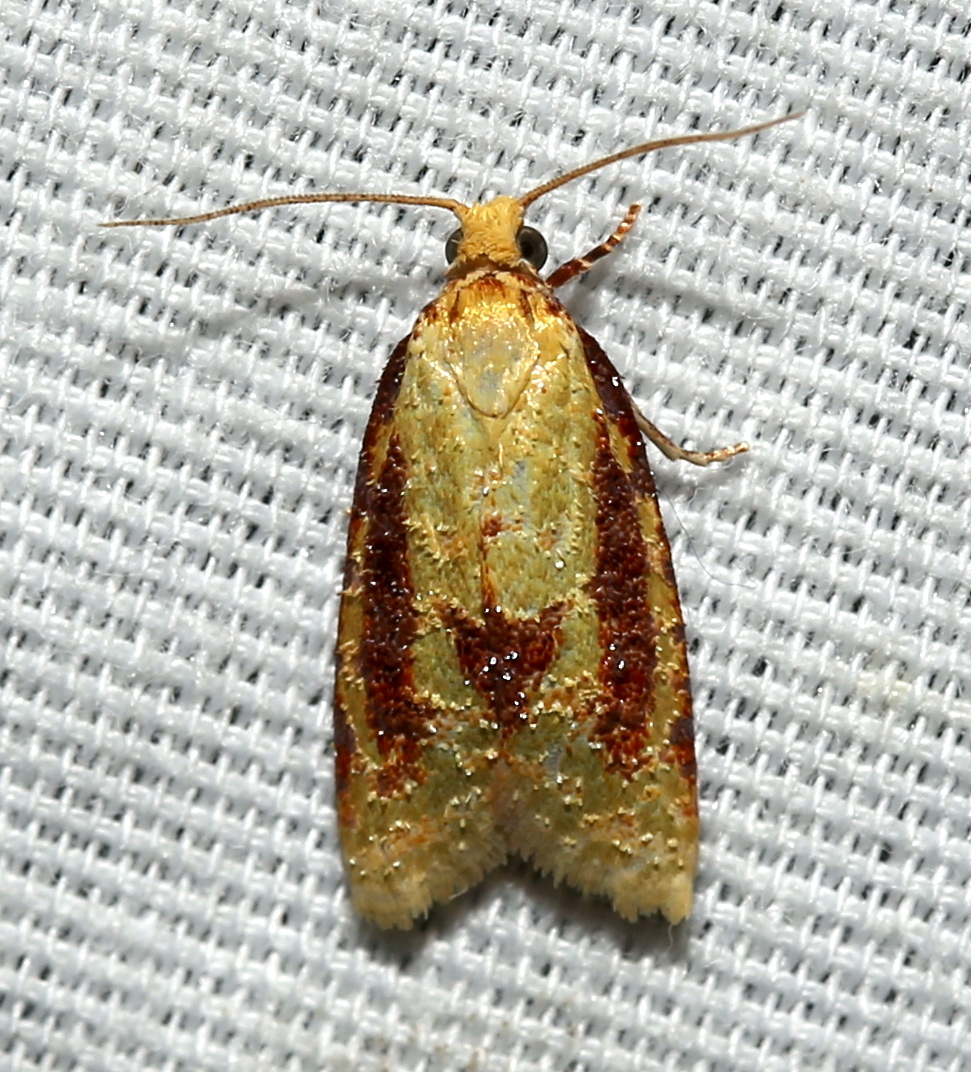

Scientific classification
- Kingdom: Animalia
- Phylum: Arthropoda
- Class: Insecta
- Order: Lepidoptera
- Family: Tortricidae
- Genus: Sparganothis
- Species: S. bistriata

Binomial name
- Sparganothis bistriata Kearfott, 1907

= Sparganothis bistriata =

Species of moth

Sparganothis bistriata is a species of moth of the family Tortricidae. It is found in the United States, including Arkansas, Florida, Georgia, Louisiana, Mississippi, North Carolina, Pennsylvania, South Carolina, Texas and Virginia.

The wingspan is about 22 mm.
