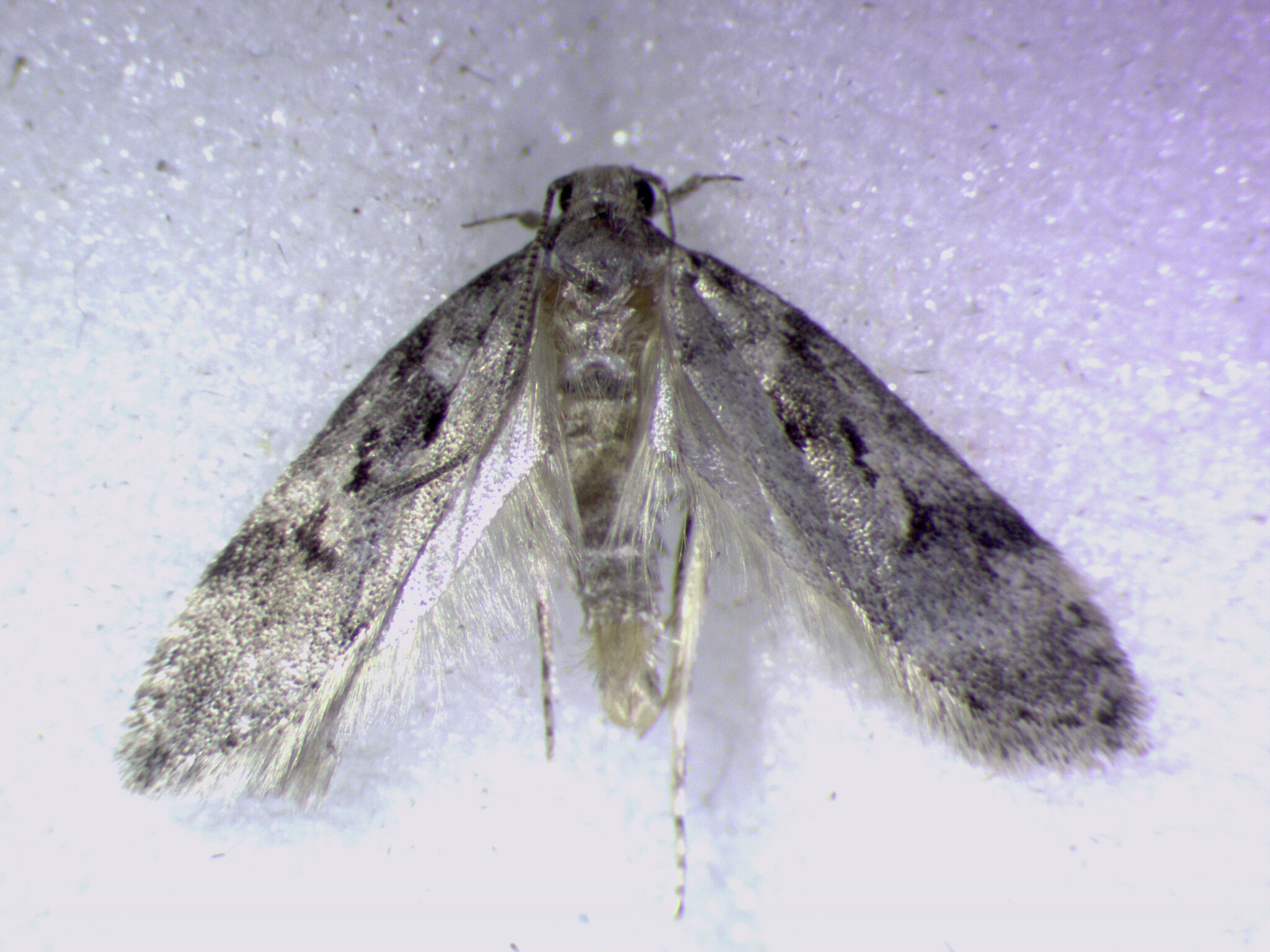

Scientific classification
- Kingdom: Animalia
- Phylum: Arthropoda
- Clade: Pancrustacea
- Class: Insecta
- Order: Lepidoptera
- Family: Gelechiidae
- Genus: Chionodes
- Species: C. terminimaculella

Binomial name
- Chionodes terminimaculella (Kearfott, 1908)

Synonyms
- Gelechia terminimaculella Kearfott, 1908

= Chionodes terminimaculella =

Species of moth

Chionodes terminimaculella is a species of moth in the family Gelechiidae. It is found in North America, where it has been recorded from south-western Quebec to southern British Columbia and to Colorado and Massachusetts.

== Description ==
The wingspan is 17-18.5 mm. The forewings are stone grey, marked with black. The base of costa is blackish grey, with a short black dash from the inner fifth, joining an oblique inverted comma-shaped mark that extends to the fold. Between this and the base, there is a small black dash in the middle of the wing and a dot on the dorsal margin close to the base. There are two black dots in the middle of the cell, the upper one nearer the base. Above them, the costa is slightly sprinkled with black scales. At the outer third of costa there is a rounded shade of blackish scales, extending down to the middle of the wing. There is also an oblique, elongated black spot on the inner edge of this shade, at the end of the cell. The terminal line consists of a row of dots, beginning with the costal cilia and following the termen to the tornus. The hindwings are very light grey.

== Ecology ==
The larvae feed on Populus tremuloides and Populus balsamifera.
