= Blueberry leafroller =

Blueberry leafroller is a common name for several insects and may refer to:

- Dasystoma salicella, a moth species native to Europe
- Sparganothis sulfureana, a moth species found in North America and Cuba
