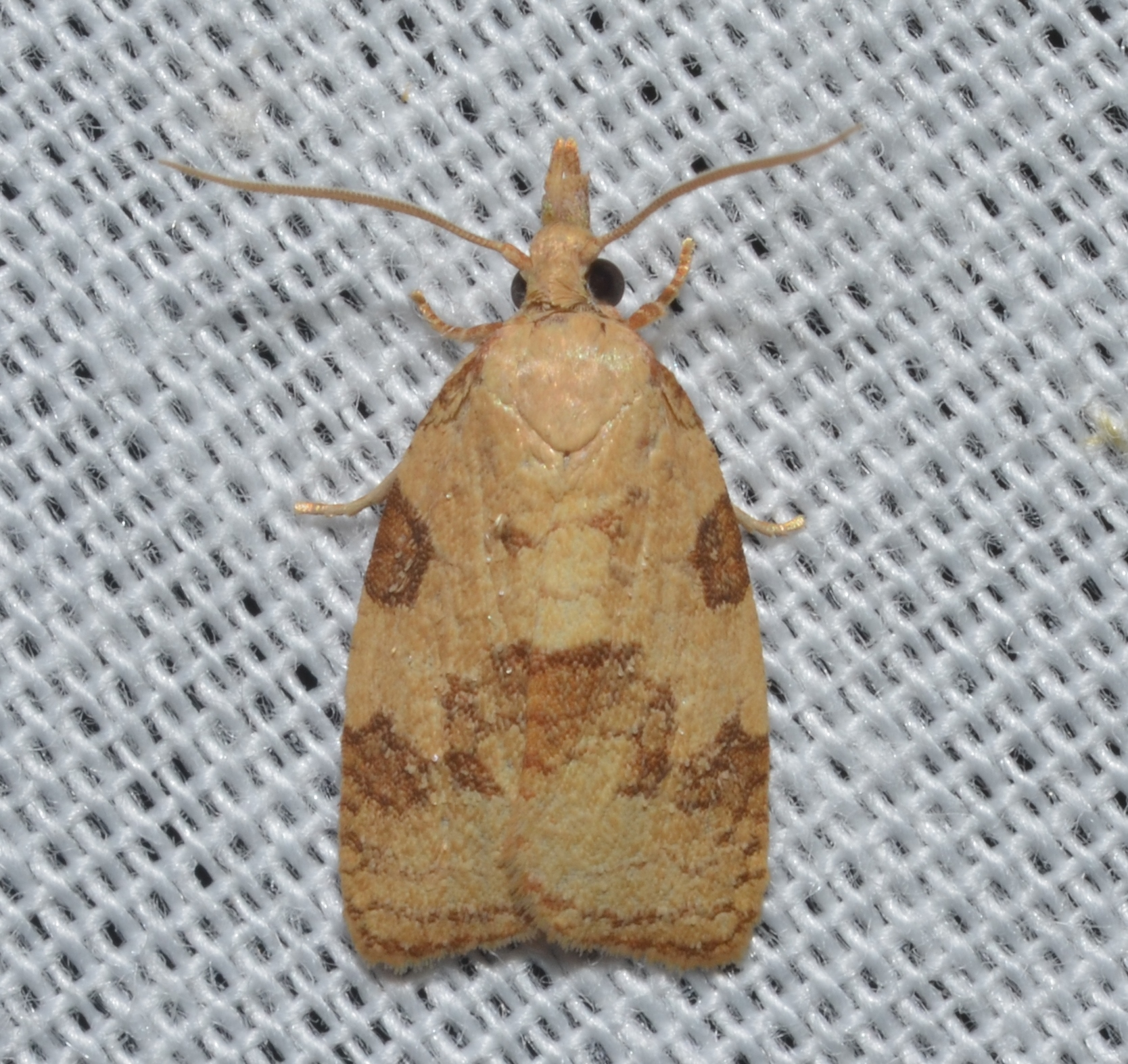

Scientific classification
- Domain: Eukaryota
- Kingdom: Animalia
- Phylum: Arthropoda
- Class: Insecta
- Order: Lepidoptera
- Family: Tortricidae
- Genus: Sparganothis
- Species: S. saracana

Binomial name
- Sparganothis saracana (Kearfott, 1907)

Synonyms
- Cenopis saracana Kearfott, 1907; Cenopis austera Meyrick, 1912

= Sparganothis saracana =

Species of moth

Sparganothis saracana is a species of moth of the family Tortricidae. It is found in the United States, including Alabama, Arkansas, Florida, Louisiana, Maryland, Mississippi, Missouri, New Jersey, North Carolina, Tennessee, Texas, Virginia and West Virginia.

The wingspan is 17–22 mm.
