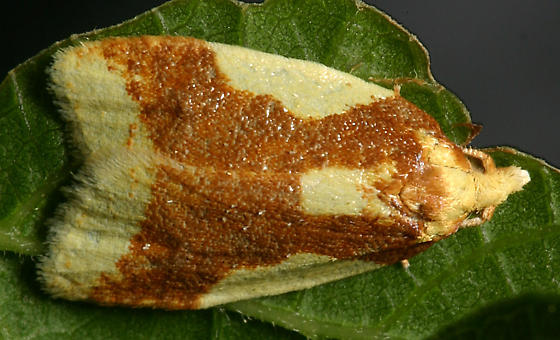

Scientific classification
- Kingdom: Animalia
- Phylum: Arthropoda
- Class: Insecta
- Order: Lepidoptera
- Family: Tortricidae
- Genus: Sparganothis
- Species: S. pulcherrimana

Binomial name
- Sparganothis pulcherrimana (Walsingham, 1879)

Synonyms
- Cenopis pulcherrimana Walsingham, 1879

= Sparganothis pulcherrimana =

Species of moth

The aproned sparganothis or beautiful sparganothis (Sparganothis pulcherrimana) is a moth of the family Tortricidae. It is found in the eastern United States and Canada (Florida to Texas, north to at least Iowa and Ontario). The distribution is not well documented due to historical confusion with Sparganothis niveana.

The wingspan is 15–16 mm. Adults are on wing from April to June.
