= Sparganothis lycopodiana =

Scientific classification
- Domain: Eukaryota
- Kingdom: Animalia
- Phylum: Arthropoda
- Class: Insecta
- Order: Lepidoptera
- Family: Tortricidae
- Genus: Sparganothis
- Species: S. lycopodiana

Binomial name
- Sparganothis lycopodiana (Kearfott, 1907)

Synonyms
- Epagoge lycopodiana Kearfott, 1907

Species of moth

Sparganothis lycopodiana is a species of moth of the family Tortricidae. It is found in North America, including Connecticut, Maine, Maryland, New Brunswick, New Hampshire, New York, Nova Scotia, Ontario, Pennsylvania and Quebec.

The wingspan is 12–14 mm.
