= Diedra calocedrana =

Scientific classification
- Kingdom: Animalia
- Phylum: Arthropoda
- Clade: Pancrustacea
- Class: Insecta
- Order: Lepidoptera
- Family: Tortricidae
- Genus: Diedra
- Species: D. calocedrana

Binomial name
- Diedra calocedrana Rubinoff & Powell, 1999

Species of moth

Diedra calocedrana is a species of moth of the family Tortricidae. It is found in the United States, where it has been recorded from California.

The moth is about 20 mm. Adults have been recorded on wing in July and August.
