= Sparganothis tessellata =

Scientific classification
- Kingdom: Animalia
- Phylum: Arthropoda
- Clade: Pancrustacea
- Class: Insecta
- Order: Lepidoptera
- Family: Tortricidae
- Genus: Sparganothis
- Species: S. tessellata

Binomial name
- Sparganothis tessellata Powell & Brown, 2012

Species of moth

Sparganothis tessellata is a species of moth of the family Tortricidae. It is found in the United States in Alabama, Florida, Georgia and Mississippi.

The wingspan is 10–11 mm.
