= Sparganothis chambersana =

Scientific classification
- Domain: Eukaryota
- Kingdom: Animalia
- Phylum: Arthropoda
- Class: Insecta
- Order: Lepidoptera
- Family: Tortricidae
- Genus: Sparganothis
- Species: S. chambersana

Binomial name
- Sparganothis chambersana (Kearfott, 1907)

Synonyms
- Cenopis chambersana Kearfott, 1907

Species of moth

Sparganothis chambersana is a species of moth of the family Tortricidae. It is found in the United States, including Arkansas, Florida, Kentucky, Louisiana, Maryland, Mississippi, Missouri, New York, North Carolina, Ohio, South Carolina, Tennessee and Texas.

The wingspan is about 16–20 mm.
