= Diedra wielgusi =

Scientific classification
- Domain: Eukaryota
- Kingdom: Animalia
- Phylum: Arthropoda
- Class: Insecta
- Order: Lepidoptera
- Family: Tortricidae
- Genus: Diedra
- Species: D. wielgusi

Binomial name
- Diedra wielgusi (Clarke, 1991)

Synonyms
- Argyrotaenia wielgusi Clarke, 1991

Species of moth

Diedra wielgusi is a species of moth of the family Tortricidae. It is found in North America, where it has been recorded from Arizona, Nevada, New Mexico, Ontario and Texas.

The moth is about 24–28 mm. Adults have been recorded on wing from September to November.
