= Diedra leuschneri =

Scientific classification
- Kingdom: Animalia
- Phylum: Arthropoda
- Clade: Pancrustacea
- Class: Insecta
- Order: Lepidoptera
- Family: Tortricidae
- Genus: Diedra
- Species: D. leuschneri

Binomial name
- Diedra leuschneri Rubinoff & Powell, 1999

Species of moth

Diedra leuschneri is a species of moth of the family Tortricidae. It is found in the United States, where it has been recorded from California.

The moth is about 16 mm. Adults have been recorded on wing in May, September and October.
