= Sparganothis illustris =

Scientific classification
- Domain: Eukaryota
- Kingdom: Animalia
- Phylum: Arthropoda
- Class: Insecta
- Order: Lepidoptera
- Family: Tortricidae
- Genus: Sparganothis
- Species: S. illustris

Binomial name
- Sparganothis illustris Razowski, 1975

Synonyms
- Cenopis illustris

Species of moth

Sparganothis illustris is a species of moth of the family Tortricidae. It is found on Honshu island in Japan.

The wingspan is 18–21 mm.
