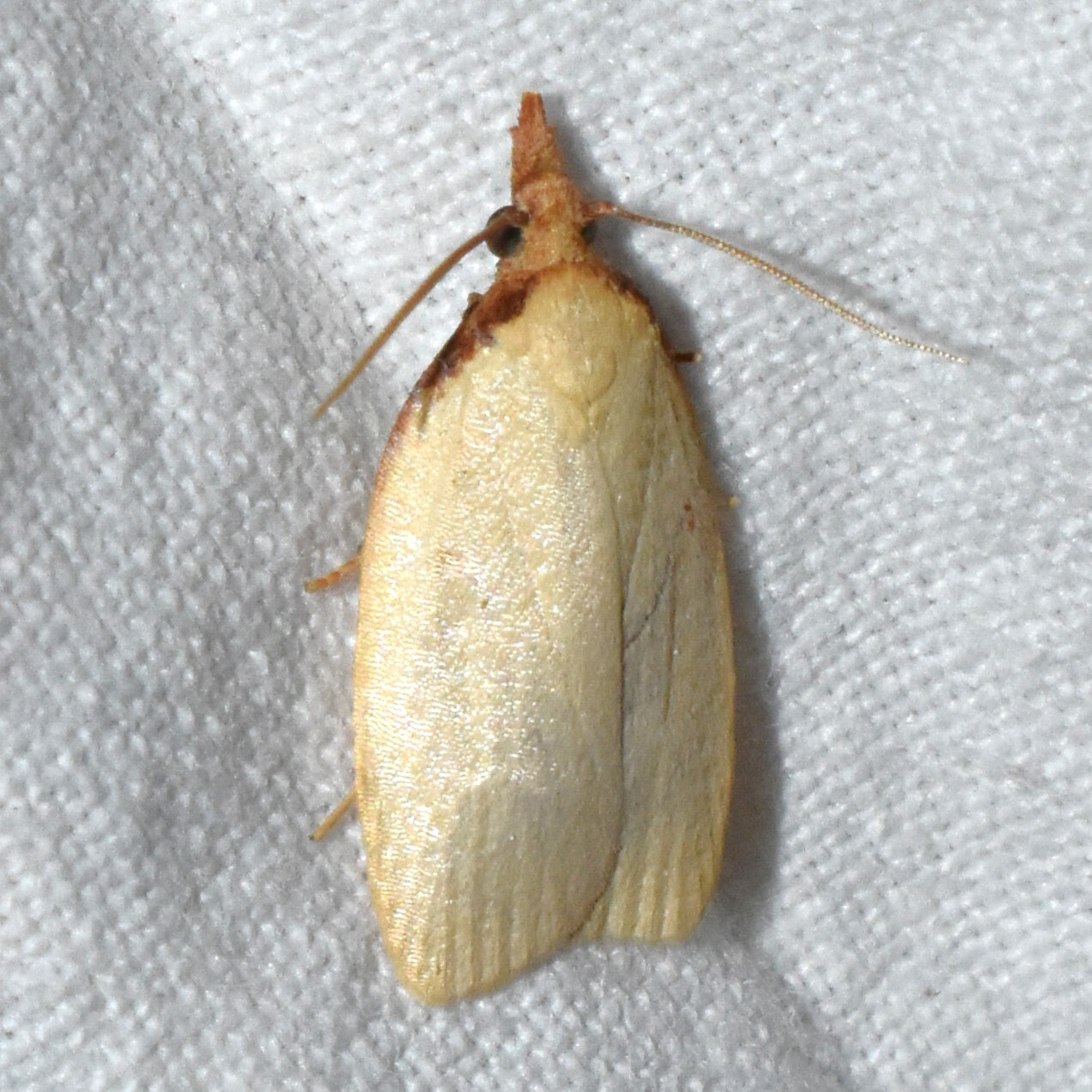

Scientific classification
- Kingdom: Animalia
- Phylum: Arthropoda
- Clade: Pancrustacea
- Class: Insecta
- Order: Lepidoptera
- Family: Tortricidae
- Genus: Sparganothis
- Species: S. unicolorana

Binomial name
- Sparganothis unicolorana (Powell & Brown, 2012)

Synonyms
- Cenopis unicolorana Powell & Brown, 2012

= Sparganothis unicolorana =

Species of moth

Sparganothis unicolorana is a species of moth of the family Tortricidae. It is found in the south-eastern United States in Alabama, Florida, Louisiana, Maryland, Mississippi, North Carolina and Virginia.
