= Sparganothis boweri =

Scientific classification
- Kingdom: Animalia
- Phylum: Arthropoda
- Clade: Pancrustacea
- Class: Insecta
- Order: Lepidoptera
- Family: Tortricidae
- Genus: Sparganothis
- Species: S. boweri

Binomial name
- Sparganothis boweri Powell & Brown, 2012

Species of moth

Sparganothis boweri is a species of moth of the family Tortricidae. It is found in North America, where it has been recorded from Alberta, Colorado, Connecticut, Maine, Manitoba, Maryland, Massachusetts, Michigan, Minnesota, New Brunswick, New Jersey, New York, Nova Scotia, Ohio, Ontario, Pennsylvania, Quebec, Saskatchewan, Wisconsin and Wyoming.

The wingspan is 18–21 mm.
