= Sparganothis cana =

Scientific classification
- Kingdom: Animalia
- Phylum: Arthropoda
- Class: Insecta
- Order: Lepidoptera
- Family: Tortricidae
- Genus: Sparganothis
- Species: S. cana

Binomial name
- Sparganothis cana (Robinson, 1869)

Synonyms
- Tortrix cana Robinson, 1869; Cenopis cana

Species of moth

Sparganothis cana, the gray sparganothis moth, is a species of moth of the family Tortricidae. It is found in North America, including Alabama, Arkansas, Florida, Kentucky, Louisiana, Manitoba, Maryland, Michigan, Mississippi, New Jersey, New York, North Carolina, Ontario, Quebec, Saskatchewan, South Carolina, Texas and Virginia.

The wingspan is about 18 mm.
