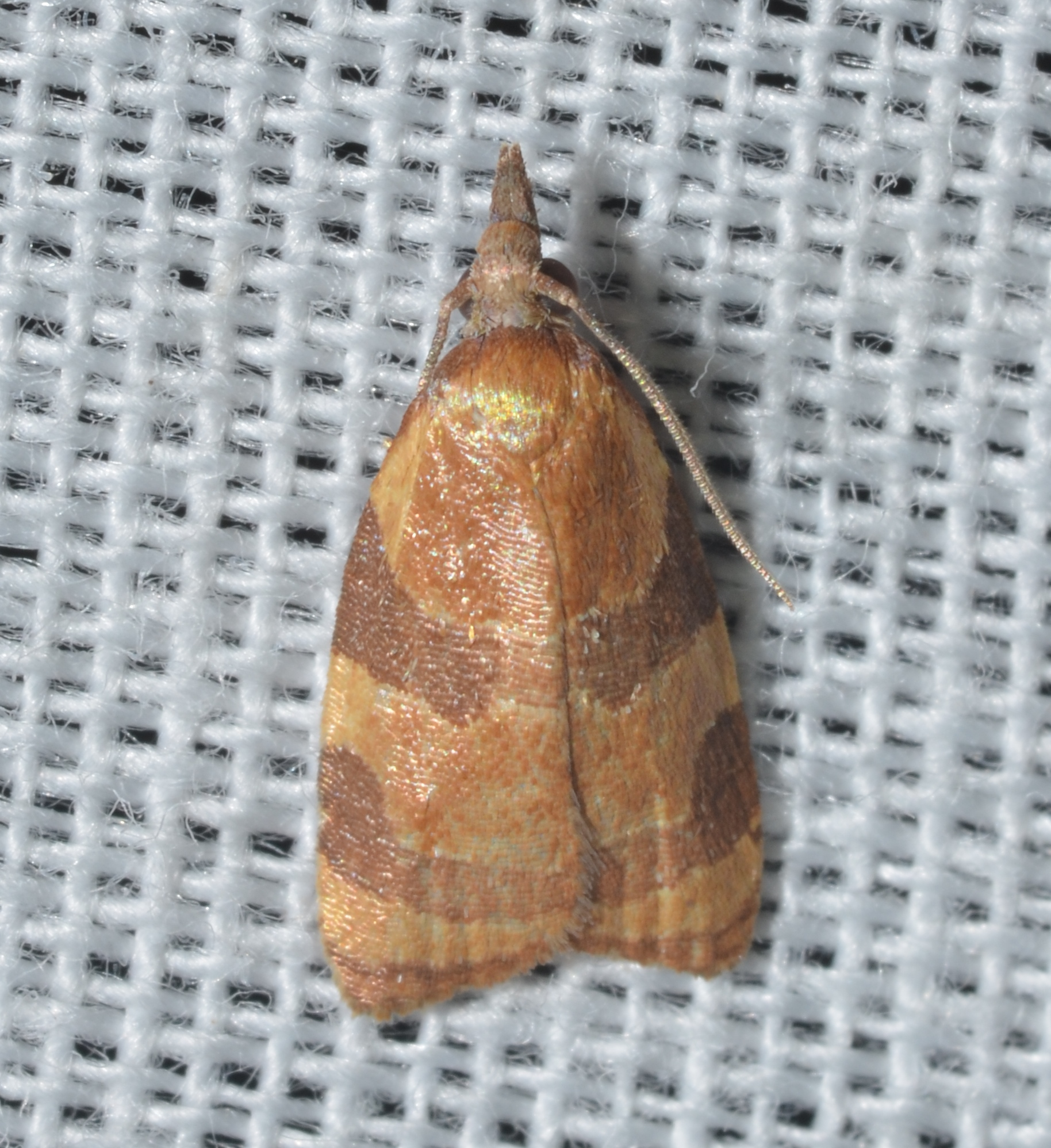
- Sparganothis diluticostana

Scientific classification
- Kingdom: Animalia
- Phylum: Arthropoda
- Class: Insecta
- Order: Lepidoptera
- Family: Tortricidae
- Genus: Sparganothis
- Species: S. diluticostana

Binomial name
- Sparganothis diluticostana (Walsingham, 1879)

Synonyms
- Cenopis diluticostana Walsingham, 1879; Cenopis quercana Fernald, 1882

= Sparganothis diluticostana =

Species of moth

Sparganothis diluticostana, the spring dead-leaf roller, is a species of moth of the family Tortricidae. It is found in North America from Quebec to Florida, west to Texas and Nebraska and north to Minnesota and Ontario.

The wingspan is 12–14 mm. Adults are on wing from April to August.

The larvae feed on the leaves of Fraxinus species.
