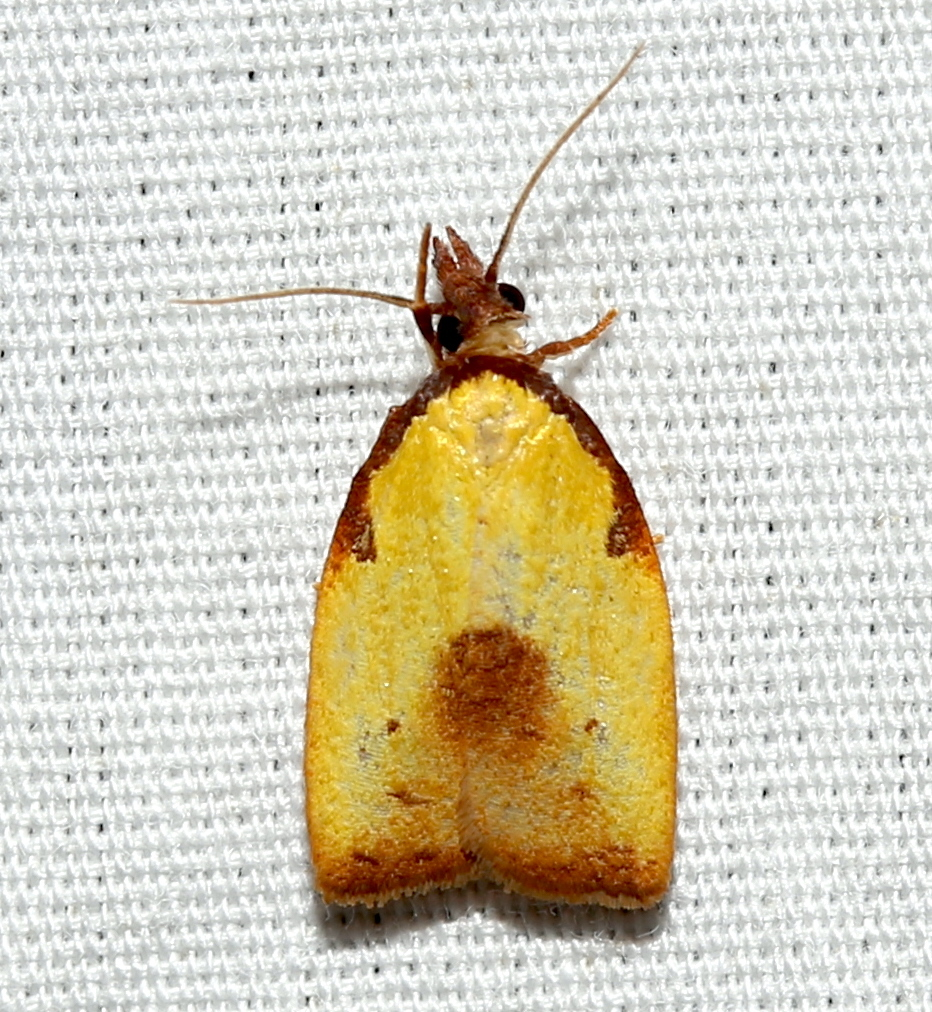

Scientific classification
- Kingdom: Animalia
- Phylum: Arthropoda
- Class: Insecta
- Order: Lepidoptera
- Family: Tortricidae
- Genus: Sparganothis
- Species: S. lamberti

Binomial name
- Sparganothis lamberti Franclemont, 1986

Synonyms
- Cenopis lamberti

= Sparganothis lamberti =

Species of moth

Sparganothis lamberti is a species of moth of the family Tortricidae. It is found in the United States, including Alabama, Florida, Georgia, Louisiana, Mississippi, North Carolina, South Carolina, Texas and Virginia.

The wingspan is 16–21 mm.
