= Sparganothis tunicana =

Scientific classification
- Domain: Eukaryota
- Kingdom: Animalia
- Phylum: Arthropoda
- Class: Insecta
- Order: Lepidoptera
- Family: Tortricidae
- Genus: Sparganothis
- Species: S. tunicana

Binomial name
- Sparganothis tunicana (Walsingham, 1879)

Synonyms
- Dichelia tunicana Walsingham, 1879; Dichelia californiana Walsingham, 1879

Species of moth

Sparganothis tunicana is a species of moth of the family Tortricidae. It is found in North America in California, Washington, Oregon, Utah, Idaho and British Columbia.

The length of the forewings is 6.5-9.5 mm.

The larvae feed on Trifolium hybridum, Baccharis species, Lomatium nudicaule, Lomatium utriculatum, Pinus ponderosa, Populus species, Trifolium pratense, Rosa species and Lithospermum ruderale.
