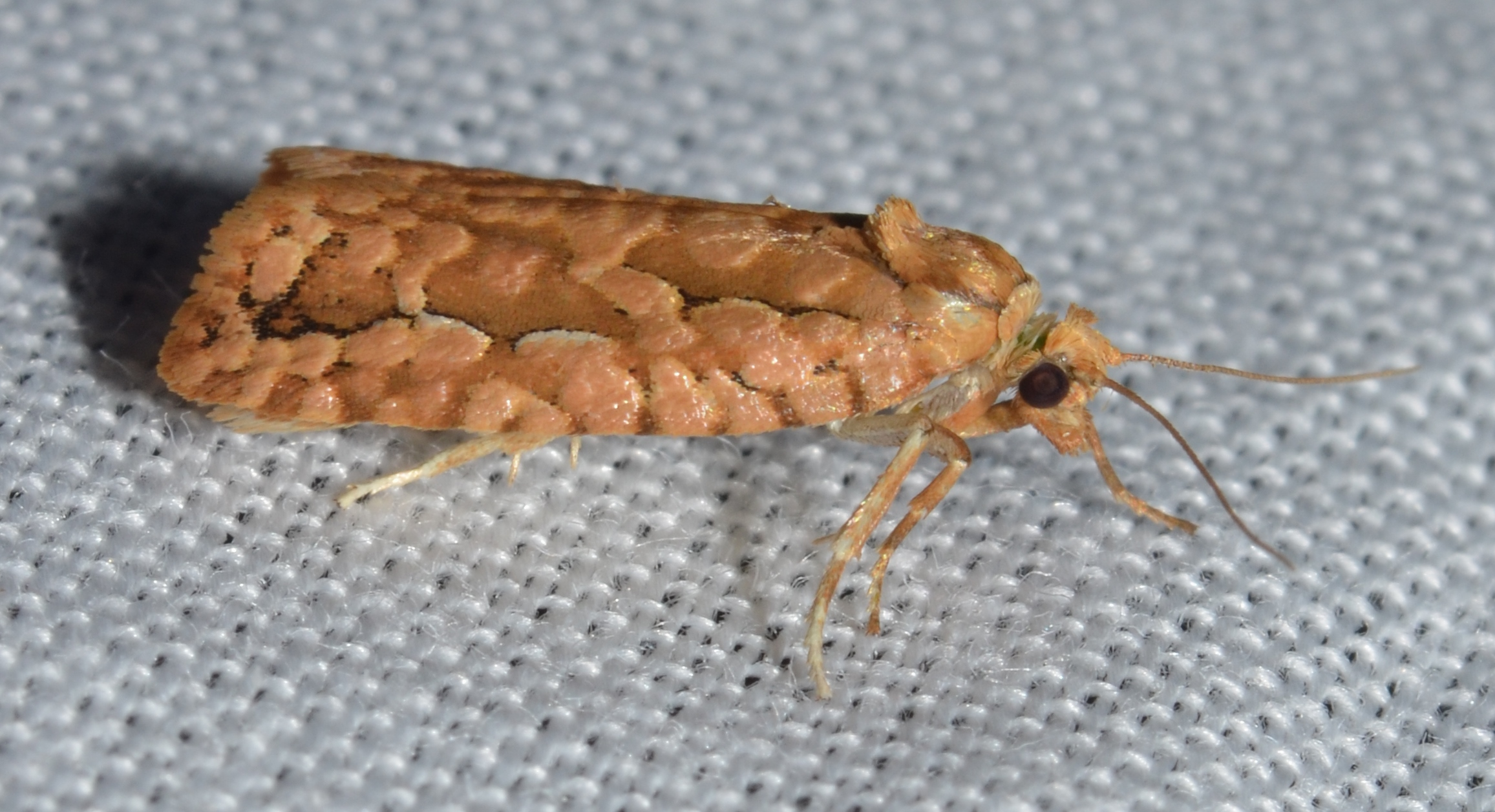

Scientific classification
- Kingdom: Animalia
- Phylum: Arthropoda
- Clade: Pancrustacea
- Class: Insecta
- Order: Lepidoptera
- Family: Tortricidae
- Tribe: Archipini
- Genus: Diedra; Rubinoff & Powell, 1999

= Diedra =

Genus of tortrix moths

Diedra is a genus of moths belonging to the family Tortricidae.

== Species ==
- Diedra calocedrana Rubinoff & Powell, 1999
- Diedra cockerellana (Kearfott, 1907)
- Diedra intermontana Rubinoff & Powell, 1999
- Diedra leuschneri Rubinoff & Powell, 1999
- Diedra wielgusi (Clarke, 1991)

== See also ==
- List of Tortricidae genera
