= Sparganothis unifasciana =

Scientific classification
- Kingdom: Animalia
- Phylum: Arthropoda
- Clade: Pancrustacea
- Class: Insecta
- Order: Lepidoptera
- Family: Tortricidae
- Genus: Sparganothis
- Species: S. unifasciana

Binomial name
- Sparganothis unifasciana (Clemens, 1864)

Synonyms
- Croesia unifasciana Clemens, 1864; Tortrix puritana Robinson, 1869

Species of moth

Sparganothis unifasciana, the one-lined sparganothis moth, is a species of moth of the family Tortricidae. It is found in the northeastern United States and southeastern Canada.

The wingspan is about 18 mm. Adults are on wing in June and July.
