= Sparganothis eulongicosta =

Scientific classification
- Kingdom: Animalia
- Phylum: Arthropoda
- Clade: Pancrustacea
- Class: Insecta
- Order: Lepidoptera
- Family: Tortricidae
- Genus: Sparganothis
- Species: S. eulongicosta

Binomial name
- Sparganothis eulongicosta (Powell & Brown, 2012)

Synonyms
- Cenopis eulongicosta Powell & Brown, 2012

Species of moth

Sparganothis eulongicosta is a species of moth of the family Tortricidae. It is found in the United States in Connecticut, Louisiana, Mississippi, New Hampshire, New Jersey and Pennsylvania.

The wingspan is 16–28 mm.
