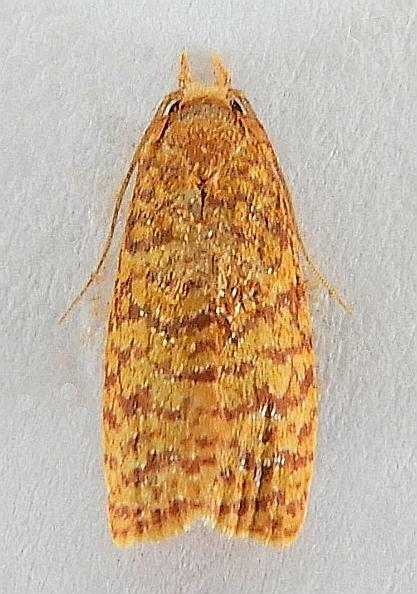

Scientific classification
- Kingdom: Animalia
- Phylum: Arthropoda
- Clade: Pancrustacea
- Class: Insecta
- Order: Lepidoptera
- Family: Tortricidae
- Genus: Sparganothis
- Species: S. niteolinea

Binomial name
- Sparganothis niteolinea Powell & Brown, 2012

= Sparganothis niteolinea =

Species of moth

Sparganothis niteolinea is a species of moth of the family Tortricidae. It is found in the United States in Alabama, Florida and North Carolina.
