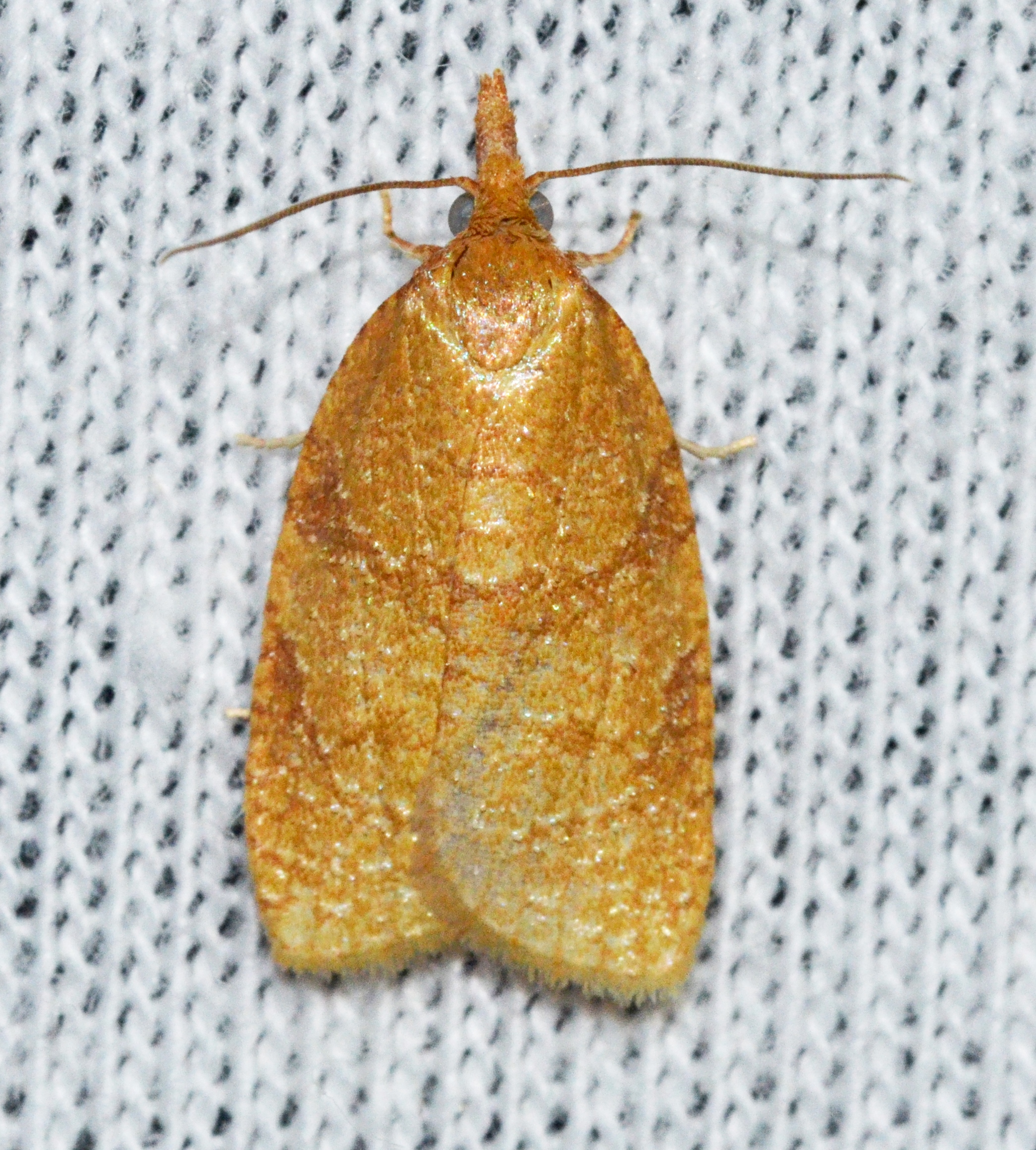

Scientific classification
- Kingdom: Animalia
- Phylum: Arthropoda
- Class: Insecta
- Order: Lepidoptera
- Family: Tortricidae
- Genus: Sparganothis
- Species: S. directana

Binomial name
- Sparganothis directana (Walker, 1863)

Synonyms
- Oenectra directana Walker, 1863; Cenopis directana; Cenopis testulana Zeller, 1875

= Sparganothis directana =

Species of moth

Sparganothis directana, the chokecherry leafroller moth, is a species of moth of the family Tortricidae. It is found in North America from Ontario to Florida, west to Texas and Michigan.

The wingspan is about 20 mm. Adults are on wing from June to August.

The larvae feed on the leaves of Prunus virginiana.
