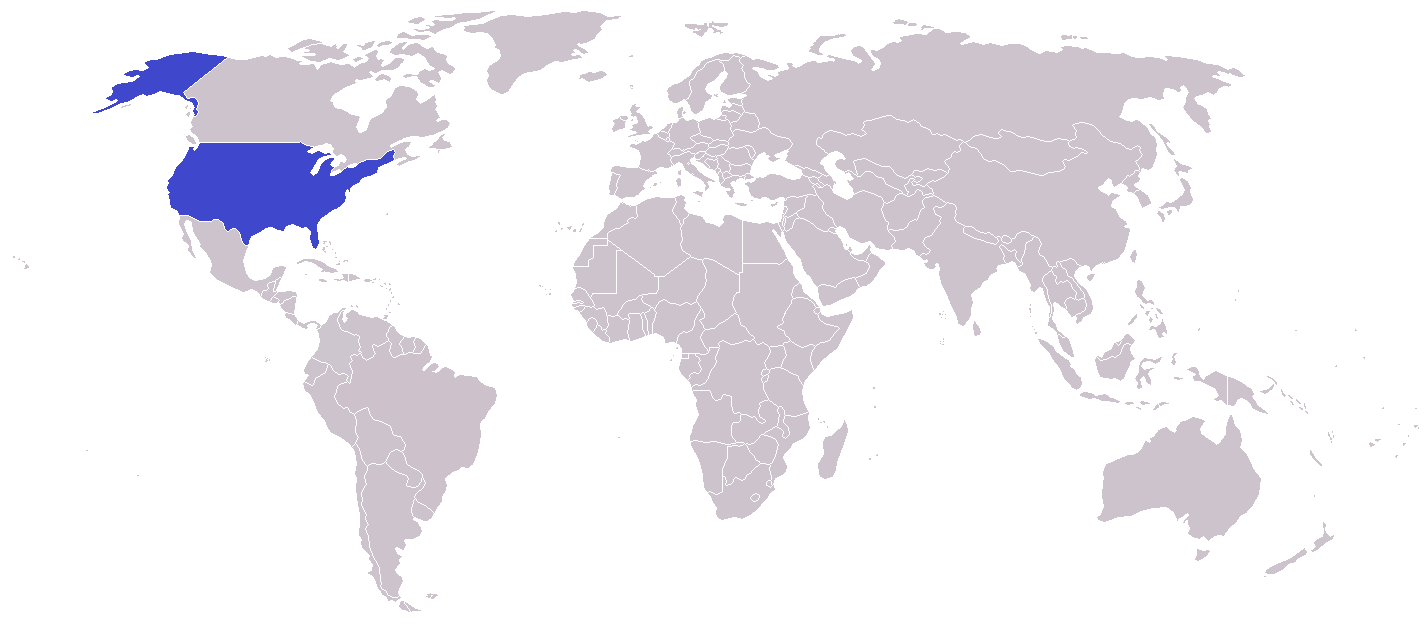

Scientific classification
- Kingdom: Animalia
- Phylum: Arthropoda
- Clade: Pancrustacea
- Class: Insecta
- Order: Lepidoptera
- Family: Tortricidae
- Genus: Sparganothis
- Species: S. umbrana

Binomial name
- Sparganothis umbrana Barnes & Busck, 1920

= Sparganothis umbrana =

Species of moth

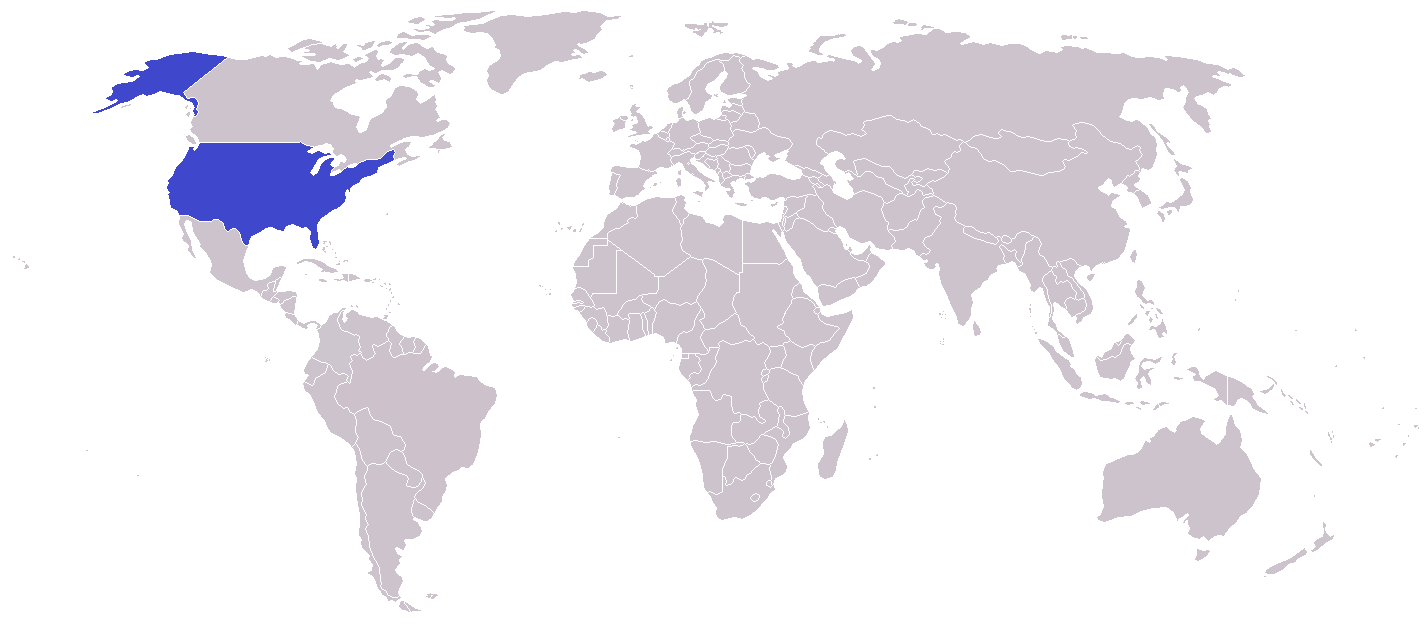

Sparganothis umbrana is a species of moth of the family Tortricidae first described by William Barnes and August Busck in 1920. It is found in North America, including Alberta, Colorado, Iowa, Maryland, Nevada, New Brunswick, New Jersey, New York, Newfoundland, Ohio, Ontario, Oregon, Quebec, Saskatchewan, South Carolina and Vermont.

The wingspan is 18–19 mm.

The larvae been recorded feeding on Euphorbia esula.
