= Sparganothis demissana =

Scientific classification
- Domain: Eukaryota
- Kingdom: Animalia
- Phylum: Arthropoda
- Class: Insecta
- Order: Lepidoptera
- Family: Tortricidae
- Genus: Sparganothis
- Species: S. demissana

Binomial name
- Sparganothis demissana (Walsingham, 1879)

Synonyms
- Cenopis demissana Walsingham, 1879

Species of moth

Sparganothis demissana is a species of moth of the family Tortricidae. It is found in North America, including Florida, Mississippi, Oklahoma and Texas in the United States and Tamaulipas in Mexico.

The wingspan is about 15 mm.
