= Sparganothis violaceana =

Scientific classification
- Domain: Eukaryota
- Kingdom: Animalia
- Phylum: Arthropoda
- Class: Insecta
- Order: Lepidoptera
- Family: Tortricidae
- Genus: Sparganothis
- Species: S. violaceana

Binomial name
- Sparganothis violaceana (Robinson, 1869)

Synonyms
- Tortrix violaceana Robinson, 1869

Species of moth

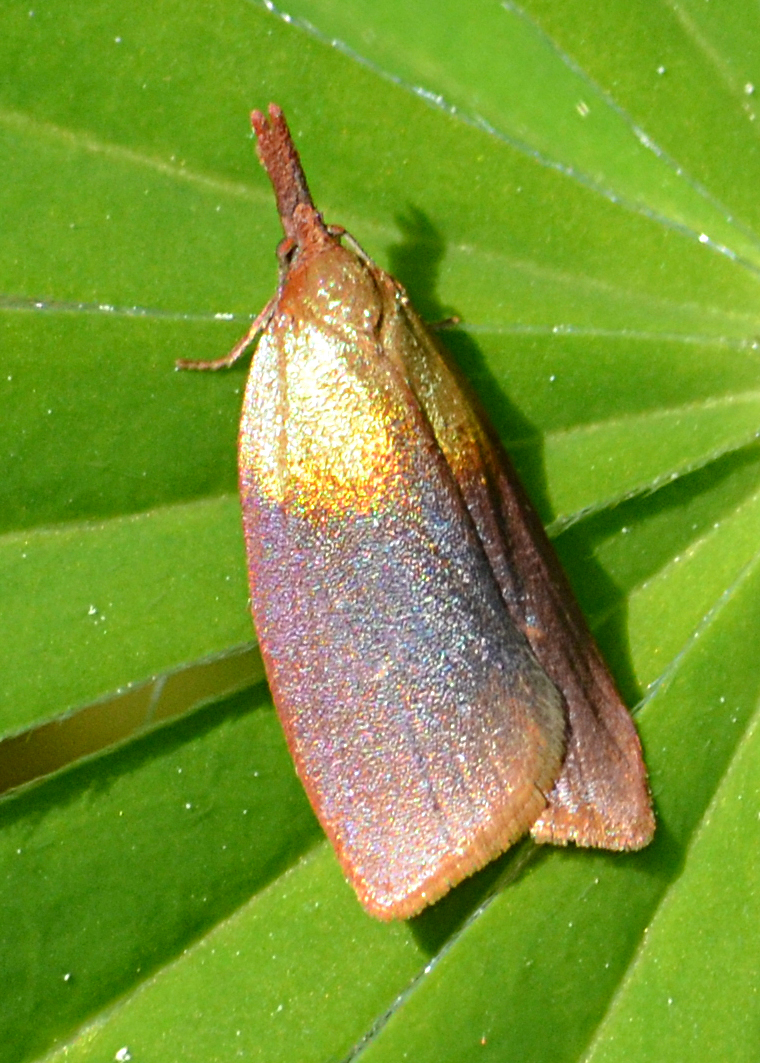

Sparganothis violaceana is a species of moth of the family Tortricidae. It is found in North America, including Alberta, Connecticut, Maine, Manitoba, Maryland, Massachusetts, Minnesota, New Brunswick, New Hampshire, New Jersey, Nova Scotia, Ontario, Pennsylvania, Quebec and Virginia.

The wingspan is 16–21 mm. Adults have been recorded on wing from May to June.

The larvae feed on Vaccinium species.
