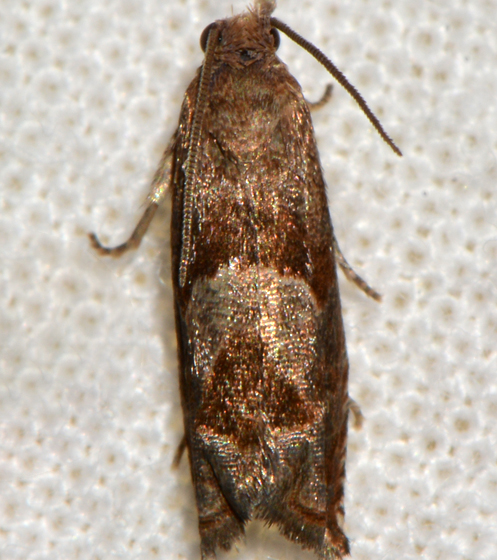
- Sonia canadana

Scientific classification
- Domain: Eukaryota
- Kingdom: Animalia
- Phylum: Arthropoda
- Class: Insecta
- Order: Lepidoptera
- Family: Tortricidae
- Tribe: Eucosmini
- Genus: Sonia; Heinrich, 1923

= Sonia (moth) =

Genus of tortrix moths

Sonia is a genus of moths belonging to the subfamily Olethreutinae of the family Tortricidae.

== Species ==
- Sonia canadana McDunnough, 1925
- Sonia comstocki Clarke, 1952
- Sonia constrictana (Zeller, 1875)
- Sonia divaricata Miller, 1990
- Sonia filiana (Busck, 1907)
- Sonia paraplesiana Blanchard, 1979
- Sonia vovana (Kearfott, 1907)

== See also ==
- List of Tortricidae genera
