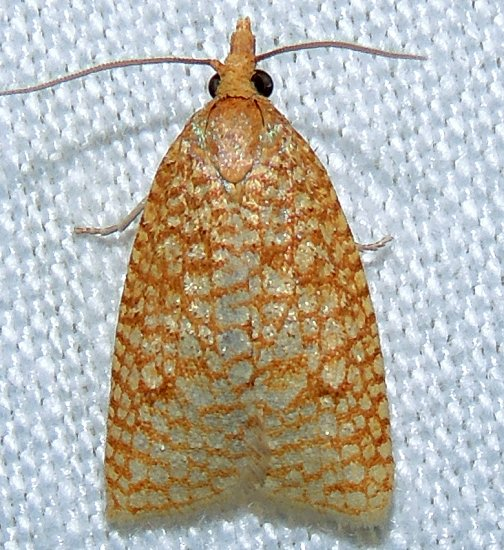

Scientific classification
- Domain: Eukaryota
- Kingdom: Animalia
- Phylum: Arthropoda
- Class: Insecta
- Order: Lepidoptera
- Family: Tortricidae
- Genus: Sparganothis
- Species: S. caryae

Binomial name
- Sparganothis caryae (Robinson, 1869)

Synonyms
- Tortrix caryae Robinson, 1869

= Sparganothis caryae =

Species of moth

Sparganothis caryae is a species of moth of the family Tortricidae. It is found in the United States, including Alabama, Arkansas, Florida, Georgia, Indiana, Kentucky, Louisiana, Maryland, Massachusetts, Michigan, Mississippi, Missouri, New Jersey, Oklahoma, Pennsylvania, South Carolina, Tennessee and Texas.

The wingspan is about 17–18 mm.
