= Sparganothis mcguinnessi =

Scientific classification
- Kingdom: Animalia
- Phylum: Arthropoda
- Clade: Pancrustacea
- Class: Insecta
- Order: Lepidoptera
- Family: Tortricidae
- Genus: Sparganothis
- Species: S. mcguinnessi

Binomial name
- Sparganothis mcguinnessi Powell & Brown, 2012

Species of moth

Sparganothis mcguinnessi is a species of moth of the family Tortricidae. It is found in New York in the United States.

== Etymology ==
The species is named in honor of Hugh McGuinness.
