= Sparganothis rubicundana =

Scientific classification
- Kingdom: Animalia
- Phylum: Arthropoda
- Class: Insecta
- Order: Lepidoptera
- Family: Tortricidae
- Genus: Sparganothis
- Species: S. rubicundana

Binomial name
- Sparganothis rubicundana (Herrich-Schaffer, 1856)

Synonyms
- Lozotaenia rubicundana Herrich-Schaffer, 1856; Sparganothis hudsoniana Freeman, 1940

Species of moth

Sparganothis rubicundana is a species of moth of the family Tortricidae. It is found in the Czech Republic, Norway, Sweden, Finland, Poland and Russia. It is also found in North America, where it has been reported from Alaska, Manitoba, the Northwest Territory and Ontario.

The wingspan is 19–22 mm for males and 15–17 mm for females. Adults are on wing in July and August in northern Europe.

The larvae feed on Vaccinium myrtillus. Larvae can be found from May to June.
