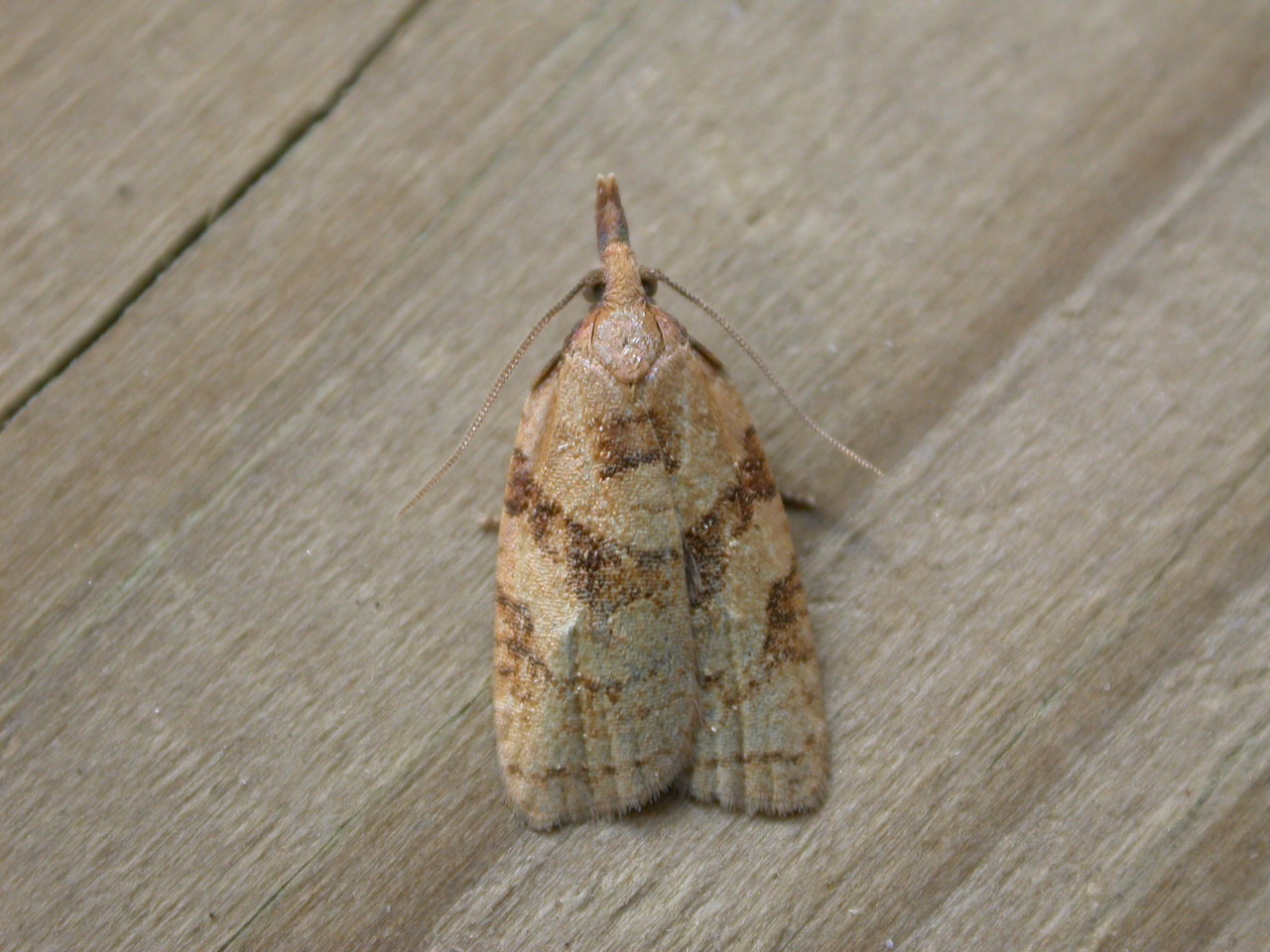
- Sparganothis pilleriana

Scientific classification
- Domain: Eukaryota
- Kingdom: Animalia
- Phylum: Arthropoda
- Class: Insecta
- Order: Lepidoptera
- Family: Tortricidae
- Subfamily: Tortricinae
- Tribe: Sparganothini
- Genus: Sparganothis; Hubner, [1825]

Synonyms
- Aenectra Doubleday, 1850; Begunna Walker, 1863; Cenopis Zeller, 1875; Enoditis Meyrick, 1912; Leptoris Clemens, 1865; Oenectra Guenée, 1845; Oenophthera Meyrick, 1913; Oenophthira Duponchel, 1845; Onectra Wocke, 1861; Sparganothris Stephens, 1834; Sparganotis Kodama, 1956; Sparganythis Matsumura, 1931; Spargonothis Hübner, [1825]

= Sparganothis =

Genus of tortrix moths

Sparganothis is a genus of moths belonging to the subfamily Tortricinae of the family Tortricidae.

== Species ==
- Sparganothis azulispecca Powell & Brown, 2012
- Sparganothis bistriata Kearfott, 1907
- Sparganothis boweri Powell & Brown, 2012
- Sparganothis cana (Robinson, 1869)
- Sparganothis caryae (Robinson, 1869)
- Sparganothis chambersana (Kearfott, 1907)
- Sparganothis daphnana McDunnough, 1961
- Sparganothis demissana (Walsingham, 1879)
- Sparganothis diluticostana (Walsingham, 1879)
- Sparganothis directana (Walker, 1863)
- Sparganothis distincta (Walsingham, 1884)
- Sparganothis eulongicosta (Powell & Brown, 2012)
- Sparganothis ferreana Busck, 1915
- Sparganothis flavibasana (Fernald, 1882)
- Sparganothis illustris Razowski, 1975
- Sparganothis karacana (Kearfott, 1907)
- Sparganothis lamberti Franclemont, 1986
- Sparganothis lindalinea Powell & Brown, 2012
- Sparganothis lycopodiana (Kearfott, 1907)
- Sparganothis matsudai Yasuda, 1975
- Sparganothis mcguinnessi Powell & Brown, 2012
- Sparganothis mesospila (Zeller, 1875)
- Sparganothis minimetallica Powell & Brown, 2012
- Sparganothis niteolinea Powell & Brown, 2012
- Sparganothis niveana (Walsingham, 1879)
- Sparganothis pettitana (Robinson, 1869)
- Sparganothis pilleriana ([Denis & Schiffermuller], 1775)
- Sparganothis praecana (Kennel, 1900)
- Sparganothis pulcherrimana (Walsingham, 1879)
- Sparganothis reticulatana (Clemens, 1860)
- Sparganothis richersi Powell & Brown, 2012
- Sparganothis robinsonana Powell & Brown, 2012
- Sparganothis rubicundana (Herrich-Schäffer, 1856)
- Sparganothis saracana (Kearfott, 1907)
- Sparganothis senecionana (Walsingham, 1879)
- Sparganothis striata (Walsingham, 1884)
- Sparganothis sulfureana (Clemens, 1860)
- Sparganothis sullivani Powell & Brown, 2012
- Sparganothis taracana Kearfott, 1907
- Sparganothis tessellata Powell & Brown, 2012
- Sparganothis tristriata Kearfott, 1907
- Sparganothis tunicana (Walsingham, 1879)
- Sparganothis umbrana Barnes & Busck, 1920
- Sparganothis unicolorana (Powell & Brown, 2012)
- Sparganothis unifasciana (Clemens, 1864)
- Sparganothis vabroui (Powell & Brown, 2012)
- Sparganothis violaceana (Robinson, 1869)
- Sparganothis vocaridorsana (Kearfott, 1905)
- Sparganothis xanthoides (Walker, 1863)

== Taxonomy ==
The genus Cenopis is either treated as a synonym Sparganothis, or a valid genus.

== See also ==
- List of Tortricidae genera
