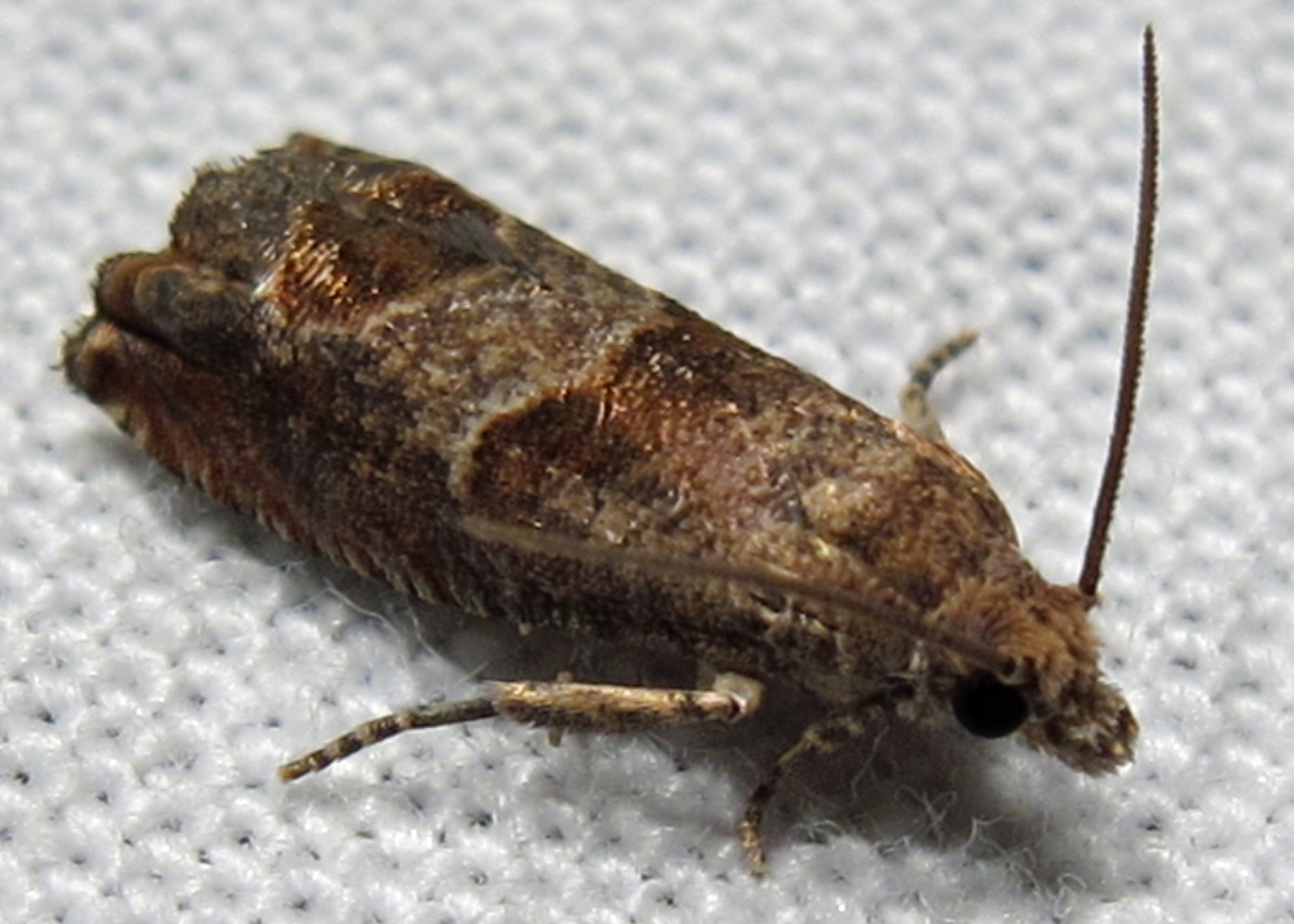

Scientific classification
- Kingdom: Animalia
- Phylum: Arthropoda
- Class: Insecta
- Order: Lepidoptera
- Family: Tortricidae
- Genus: Sonia
- Species: S. canadana

Binomial name
- Sonia canadana McDunnough, 1925

= Sonia canadana =

Species of moth

Sonia canadana, the Canadian sonium, is a species of tortricid moth in the family Tortricidae.

The MONA or Hodges number for Sonia canadana is 3219.
