= Sparganothis striata =

Scientific classification
- Domain: Eukaryota
- Kingdom: Animalia
- Phylum: Arthropoda
- Class: Insecta
- Order: Lepidoptera
- Family: Tortricidae
- Genus: Sparganothis
- Species: S. striata

Binomial name
- Sparganothis striata (Walsingham, 1884)

Synonyms
- Oenectra striata Walsingham, 1884

Species of moth

Sparganothis striata is a species of moth of the family Tortricidae. It is found in North America, including Arizona, British Columbia, California, Colorado, Montana, New Mexico, North Dakota, Oklahoma, Texas, Utah and Washington.

The wingspan is 22–23 mm.
