= Sparganothis matsudai =

Scientific classification
- Kingdom: Animalia
- Phylum: Arthropoda
- Clade: Pancrustacea
- Class: Insecta
- Order: Lepidoptera
- Family: Tortricidae
- Genus: Sparganothis
- Species: S. matsudai

Binomial name
- Sparganothis matsudai Yasuda, 1975

Synonyms
- Cenopis matsudai

Species of moth

Sparganothis matsudai is a species of moth of the family Tortricidae. It is found on the island of Honshu in Japan.

The wingspan is 14–21 mm.
