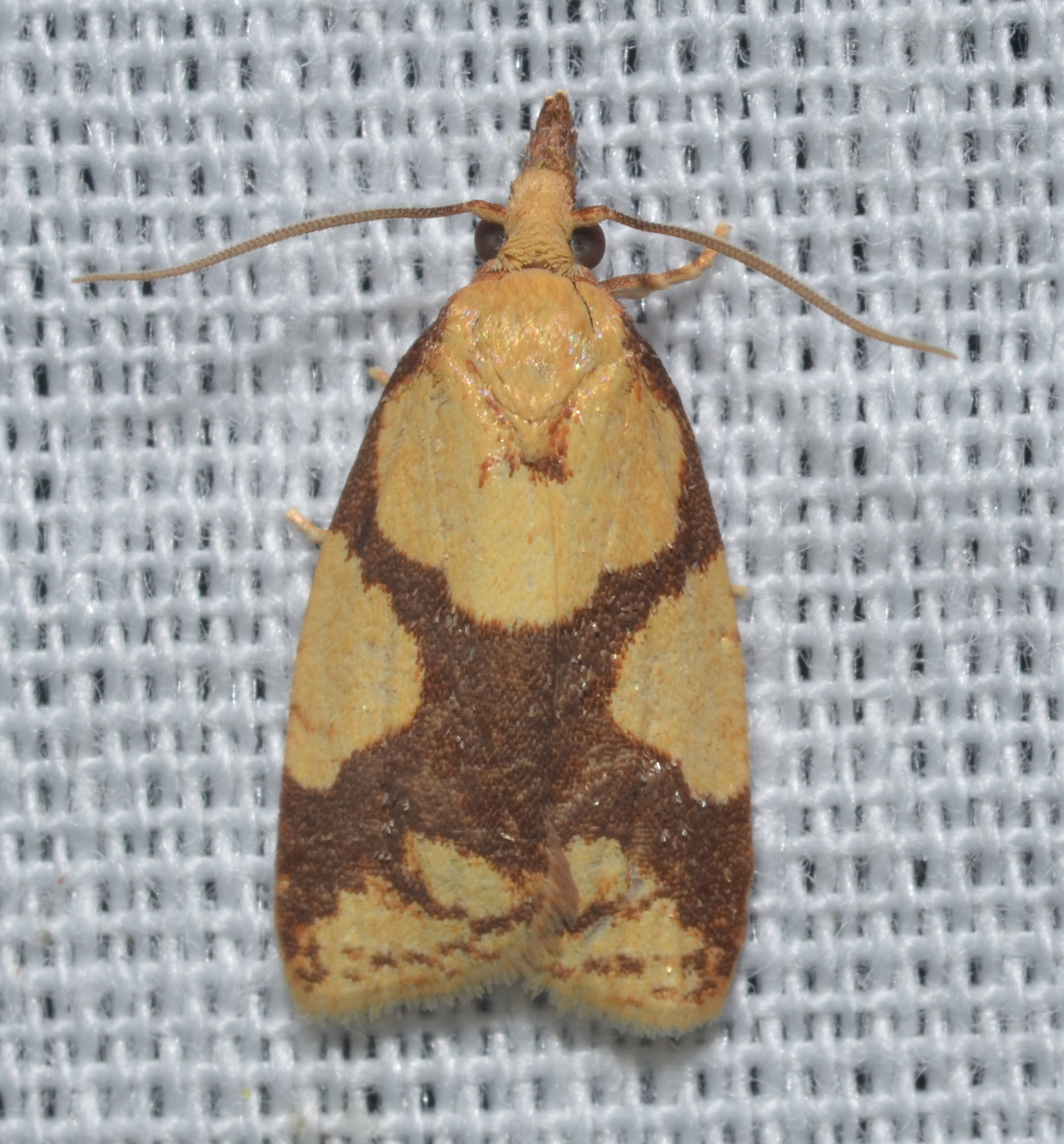

Scientific classification
- Kingdom: Animalia
- Phylum: Arthropoda
- Clade: Pancrustacea
- Class: Insecta
- Order: Lepidoptera
- Family: Tortricidae
- Genus: Sparganothis
- Species: S. ferreana

Binomial name
- Sparganothis ferreana Busck, 1915

Synonyms
- Cenopis ferreana

= Sparganothis ferreana =

Species of moth

Sparganothis ferreana is a species of moth of the family Tortricidae. It is found in eastern North America, from Nova Scotia to Florida and east to Texas.

The wingspan is 18–21 mm. Adults are on wing from March to September.

The larvae feed on various hardwoods.
