= Sparganothis robinsonana =

Scientific classification
- Kingdom: Animalia
- Phylum: Arthropoda
- Clade: Pancrustacea
- Class: Insecta
- Order: Lepidoptera
- Family: Tortricidae
- Genus: Sparganothis
- Species: S. robinsonana

Binomial name
- Sparganothis robinsonana Powell & Brown, 2012

Species of moth

Sparganothis robinsonana is a species of moth of the family Tortricidae. It is found in Texas in the United States.

The wingspan is 21–22 mm.
