= Diedra intermontana =

Scientific classification
- Kingdom: Animalia
- Phylum: Arthropoda
- Clade: Pancrustacea
- Class: Insecta
- Order: Lepidoptera
- Family: Tortricidae
- Genus: Diedra
- Species: D. intermontana

Binomial name
- Diedra intermontana Rubinoff & Powell, 1999

Species of moth

Diedra intermontana is a species of moth of the family Tortricidae. It is found in the United States, where it has been recorded from California, Nevada and New Mexico.

The moth is about 19–20 mm. Adults have been recorded on wing from June to August.
