= Sparganothis lindalinea =

Scientific classification
- Kingdom: Animalia
- Phylum: Arthropoda
- Clade: Pancrustacea
- Class: Insecta
- Order: Lepidoptera
- Family: Tortricidae
- Genus: Sparganothis
- Species: S. lindalinea

Binomial name
- Sparganothis lindalinea Powell & Brown, 2012

Species of moth

Sparganothis lindalinea is a species of moth of the family Tortricidae. It is found in the United States in Alabama, Florida and Mississippi.
