= Sparganothis vabroui =

Scientific classification
- Kingdom: Animalia
- Phylum: Arthropoda
- Clade: Pancrustacea
- Class: Insecta
- Order: Lepidoptera
- Family: Tortricidae
- Genus: Sparganothis
- Species: S. vabroui

Binomial name
- Sparganothis vabroui (Powell & Brown, 2012)

Synonyms
- Cenopis vabroui Powell & Brown, 2012

Species of moth

Sparganothis vabroui is a species of moth of the family Tortricidae. It is found in Louisiana in the United States.
