= Sparganothis daphnana =

Scientific classification
- Domain: Eukaryota
- Kingdom: Animalia
- Phylum: Arthropoda
- Class: Insecta
- Order: Lepidoptera
- Family: Tortricidae
- Genus: Sparganothis
- Species: S. daphnana

Binomial name
- Sparganothis daphnana McDunnough, 1961

Synonyms
- Cenopis daphnana

Species of moth

Sparganothis daphnana is a species of moth of the family Tortricidae. It is found in Canada, including Newfoundland and Nova Scotia.
