= Sparganothis sullivani =

Scientific classification
- Kingdom: Animalia
- Phylum: Arthropoda
- Clade: Pancrustacea
- Class: Insecta
- Order: Lepidoptera
- Family: Tortricidae
- Genus: Sparganothis
- Species: S. sullivani

Binomial name
- Sparganothis sullivani Powell & Brown, 2012

Species of moth

Sparganothis sullivani is a species of moth of the family Tortricidae. It is found in the United States in Florida, Louisiana, North Carolina and South Carolina.

The wingspan is 10–13 mm.
