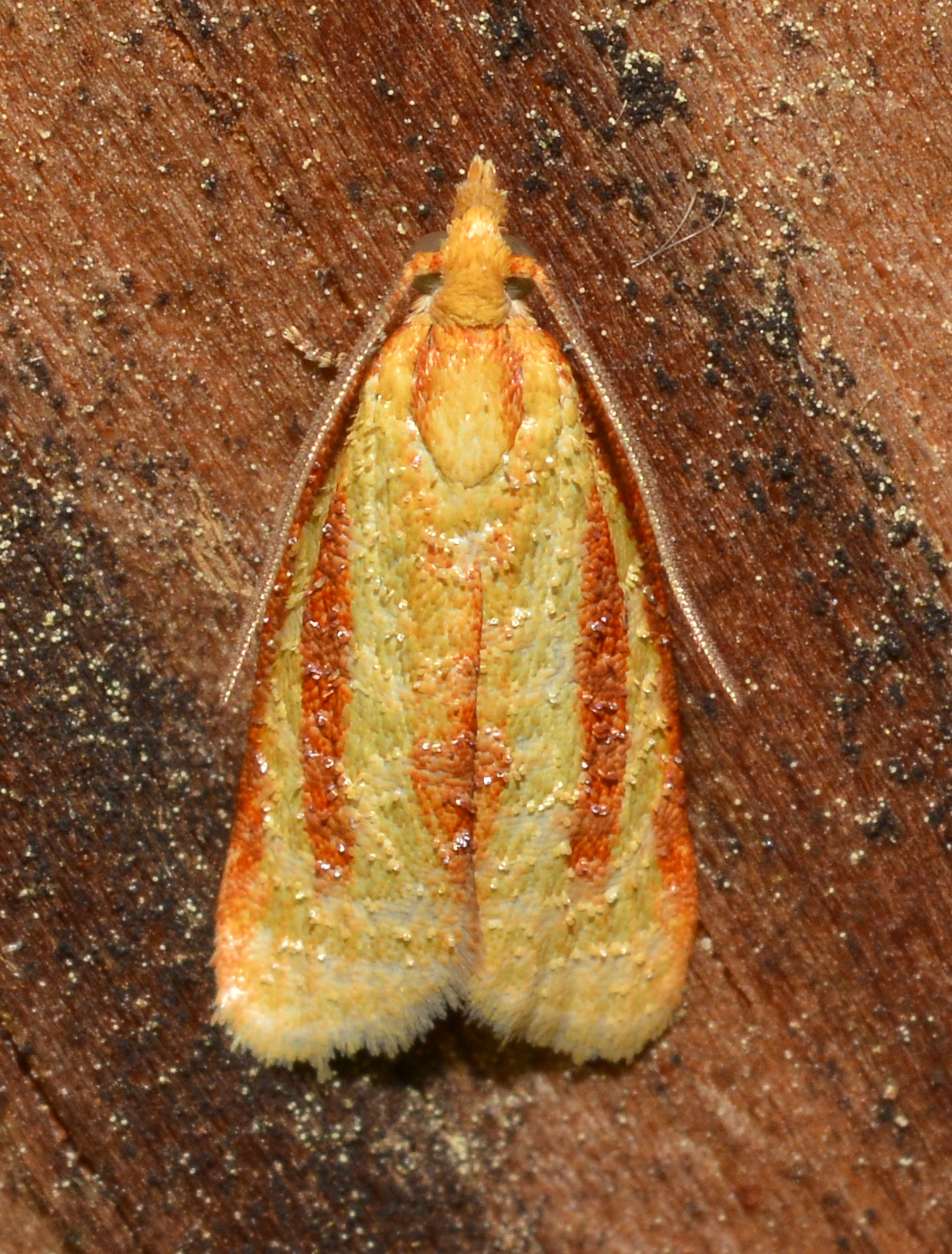

Scientific classification
- Domain: Eukaryota
- Kingdom: Animalia
- Phylum: Arthropoda
- Class: Insecta
- Order: Lepidoptera
- Family: Tortricidae
- Genus: Sparganothis
- Species: S. tristriata

Binomial name
- Sparganothis tristriata Kearfott, 1907

= Sparganothis tristriata =

Species of moth

Sparganothis tristriata, the three-streaked sparganothis moth, is a species of moth of the family Tortricidae. It is found in North America, including Alberta, Connecticut, Florida, Indiana, Kentucky, Maine, Manitoba, Maryland, Massachusetts, Minnesota, Mississippi, New Hampshire, New Jersey, New York, North Carolina, Ohio, Oklahoma, Ontario, Quebec, Saskatchewan, South Carolina, Tennessee and Wisconsin.

The wingspan is 16–20 mm.
