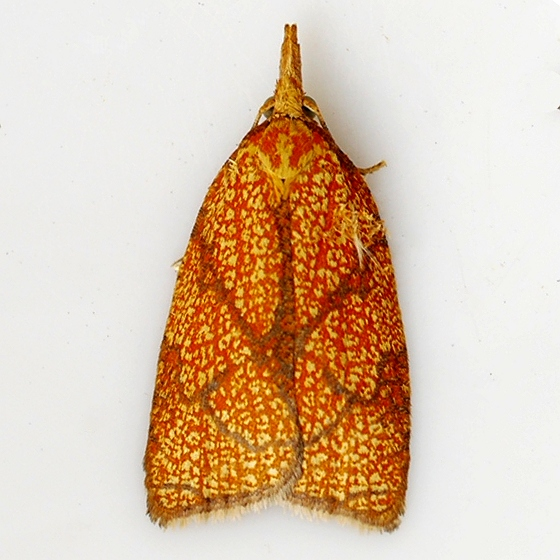

Scientific classification
- Kingdom: Animalia
- Phylum: Arthropoda
- Class: Insecta
- Order: Lepidoptera
- Family: Tortricidae
- Genus: Sparganothis
- Species: S. reticulatana

Binomial name
- Sparganothis reticulatana (Clemens, 1860)

Synonyms
- Croesia reticulatana Clemens, 1860; Pyralis fulgidipennana Blanchard, in Laporte, 1840; Cenopis gracilana Walsingham, 1879; Teras subauratana Walker, 1863

= Sparganothis reticulatana =

Species of moth

The reticulated sparganothis (Sparganothis reticulatana) is a moth of the family Tortricidae. It is found in most of eastern North America.

The wingspan is 15–17 mm. Adults are on wing from June to August.

The larvae feed on alder, apple, ash, aster, beech, blueberry, cherry, maple, oak and pear.
