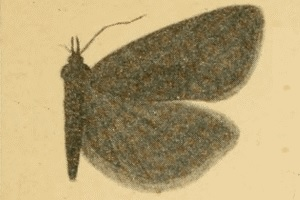

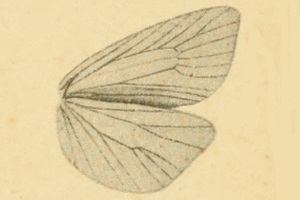

Scientific classification
- Domain: Eukaryota
- Kingdom: Animalia
- Phylum: Arthropoda
- Class: Insecta
- Order: Lepidoptera
- Family: Tortricidae
- Genus: Sparganothis
- Species: S. praecana

Binomial name
- Sparganothis praecana (Kennel, 1900)

Synonyms
- Dichelia praecana Kennel, 1900; Dichelia praecana var. abiskoana Caradja, 1916; Tortrix cinereana Zetterstedt, 1839; Dichelia lapponana Caradja, 1916

= Sparganothis praecana =

Species of moth

Sparganothis praecana is a species of moth of the family Tortricidae. It is found in Austria, Norway, Sweden, Finland and Russia. It is also found in North America, where it has been reported from Colorado, the Northwest Territory and the Yukon Territory.

The wingspan is 20–28 mm. Adults are on wing in June and July in northern Europe.

The larvae feed on Betula pendula, Vaccinium corymbosum and Rhododendron species.

== Subspecies ==
- Sparganothis praecana praecana
- Sparganothis praecana habeleri Lichtenberger, 1997 (Austrian Alps)
