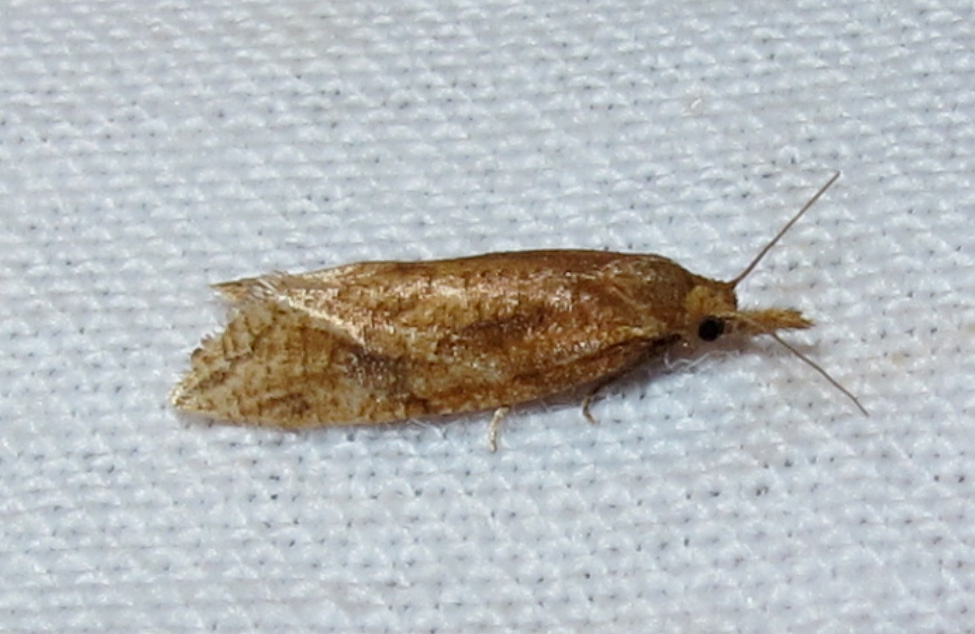

Scientific classification
- Domain: Eukaryota
- Kingdom: Animalia
- Phylum: Arthropoda
- Class: Insecta
- Order: Lepidoptera
- Family: Tortricidae
- Genus: Aethes
- Species: A. biscana

Binomial name
- Aethes biscana (Kearfott, 1907)

Synonyms
- Phalonia biscana Kearfott, 1907; Phalonia biscana var. giscana Kearfott, 1907; Phalonia ixeuta Meyrick, 1912

= Aethes biscana =

Species of moth

Aethes biscana, the reddish aethes, is a species of moth of the family Tortricidae. It is found in North America, where it has been recorded from Connecticut, Florida, Illinois, Indiana, Kentucky, Maine, Maryland, Massachusetts, New Brunswick, New Jersey, New York, Ohio, Ontario, Pennsylvania, Quebec, South Carolina and Vermont.

The wingspan is 15–23 millimetres (0.59–0.91 in). The forewings are light brown with several darker lines and markings. The hindwings are shining grey. Adults have been recorded on wing between February and December depending on the location.
