= Sparganothis flavibasana =

Scientific classification
- Domain: Eukaryota
- Kingdom: Animalia
- Phylum: Arthropoda
- Class: Insecta
- Order: Lepidoptera
- Family: Tortricidae
- Genus: Sparganothis
- Species: S. flavibasana

Binomial name
- Sparganothis flavibasana (Fernald, 1882)

Synonyms
- Oenectra flavibasana Fernald, 1882

Species of moth

Sparganothis flavibasana is a species of moth of the family Tortricidae. It is found in North America, including Illinois, Iowa, Manitoba, Ontario, Quebec and Saskatchewan.

The wingspan is about 20 mm.
