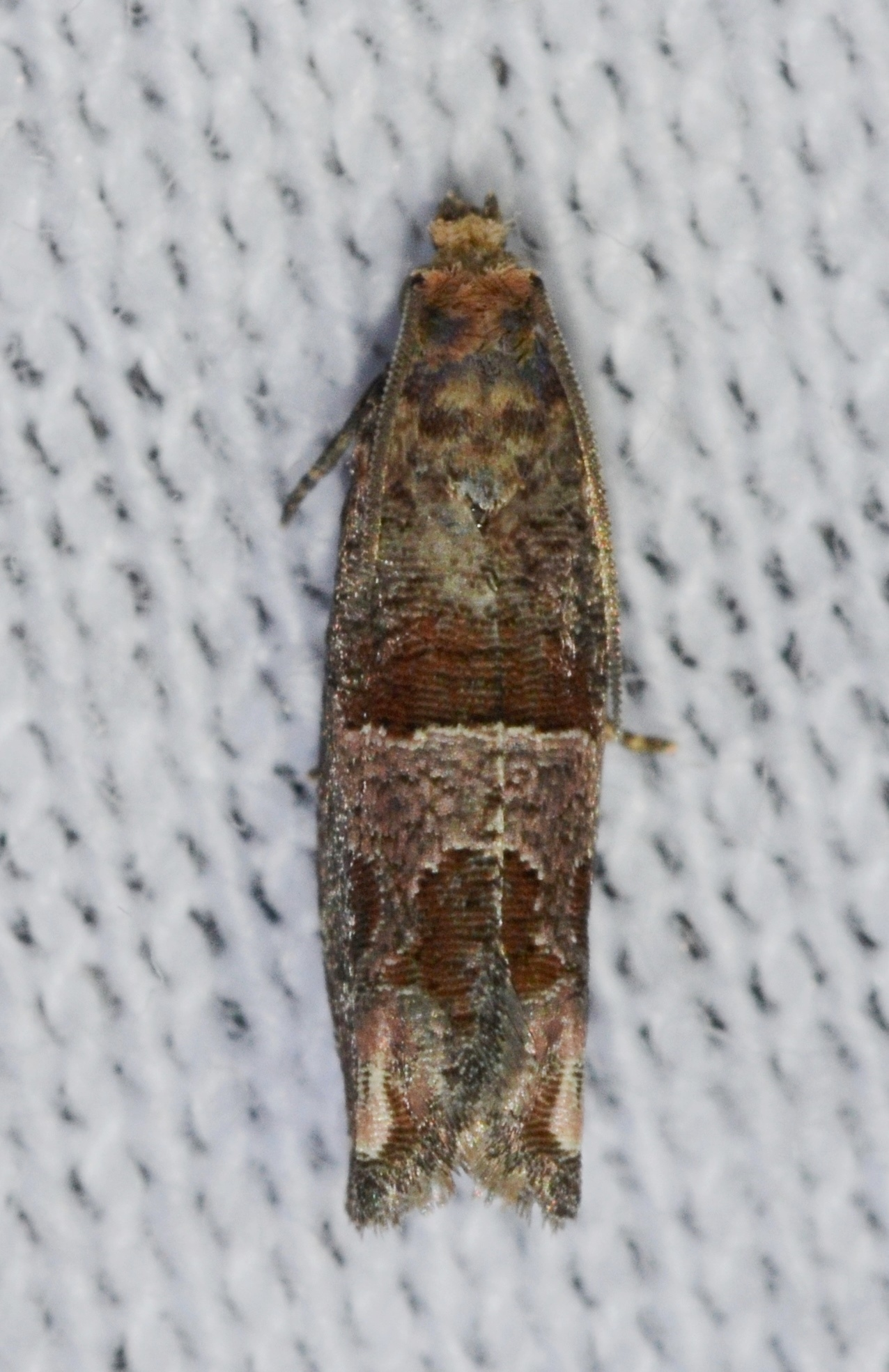

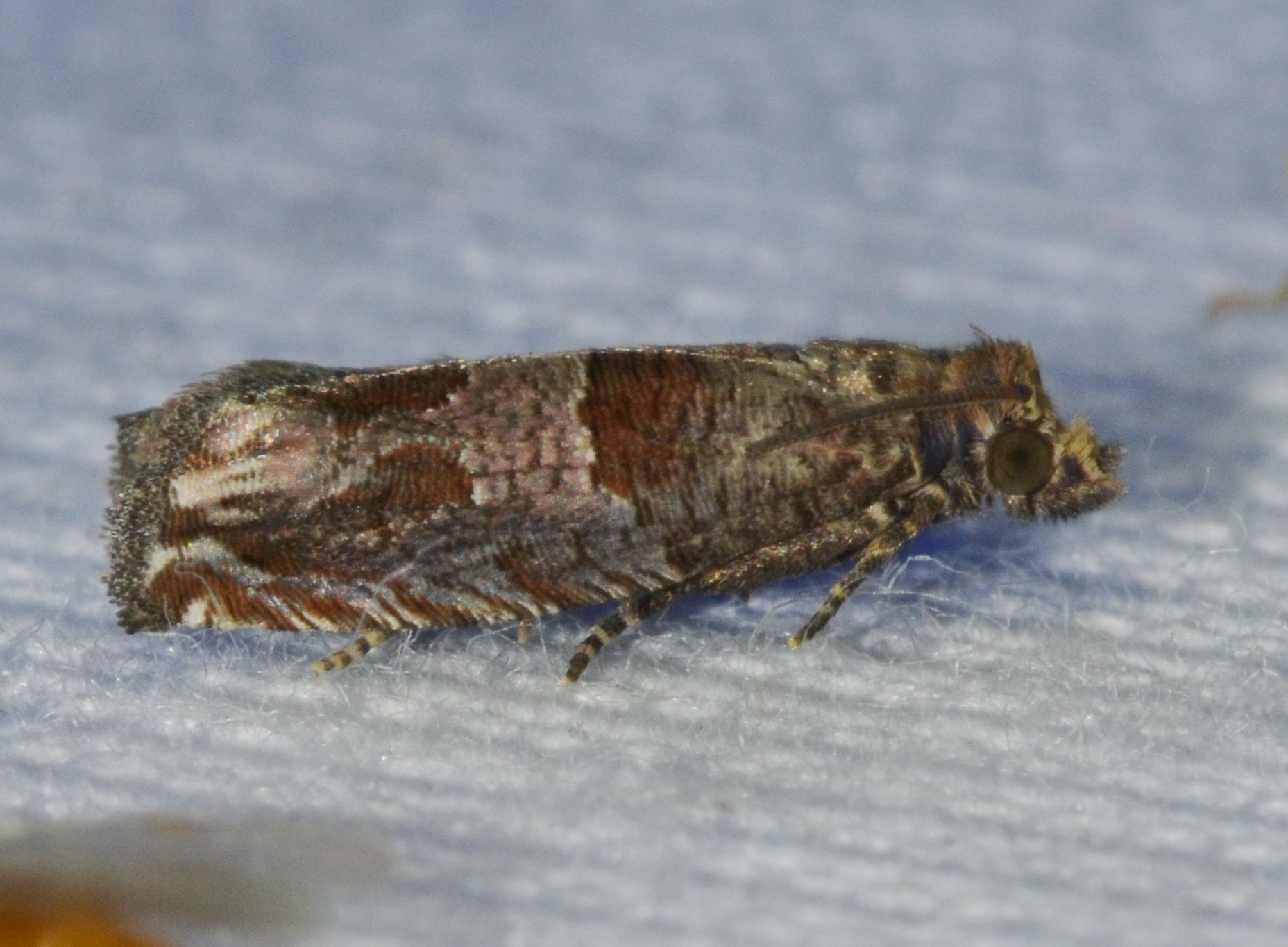

Scientific classification
- Kingdom: Animalia
- Phylum: Arthropoda
- Clade: Pancrustacea
- Class: Insecta
- Order: Lepidoptera
- Family: Tortricidae
- Genus: Sonia
- Species: S. constrictana

Binomial name
- Sonia constrictana (Zeller, 1875)

Synonyms
- Paedisca constrictana Zeller, 1875

= Sonia constrictana =

Species of moth

Sonia constrictana, the constricted sonia moth, is a species of moth of the family Tortricidae. It is found in North America, where it has been recorded from Alabama, Florida, Georgia, Illinois, Indiana, Kentucky, Maine, Maryland, Mississippi, North Carolina, Quebec, South Carolina, Tennessee, Texas and Virginia.

The wingspan is 14 mm. Adults are on wing from May to September.
