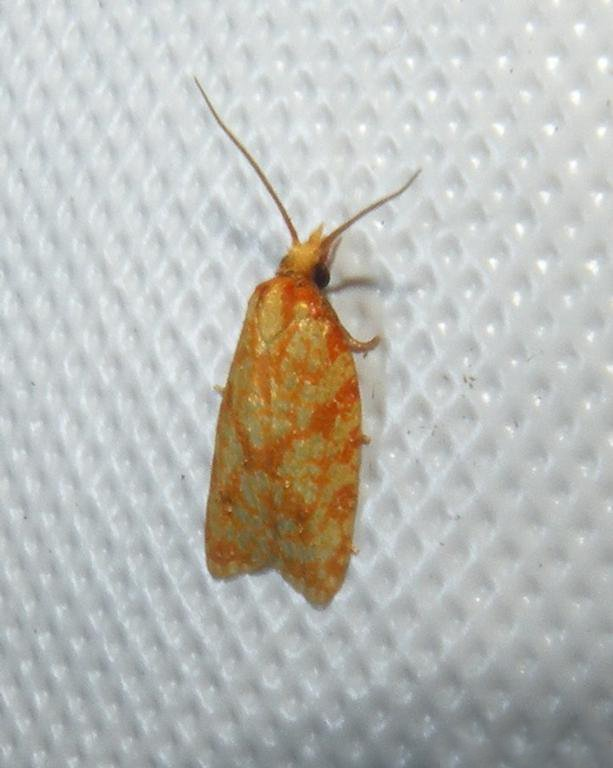

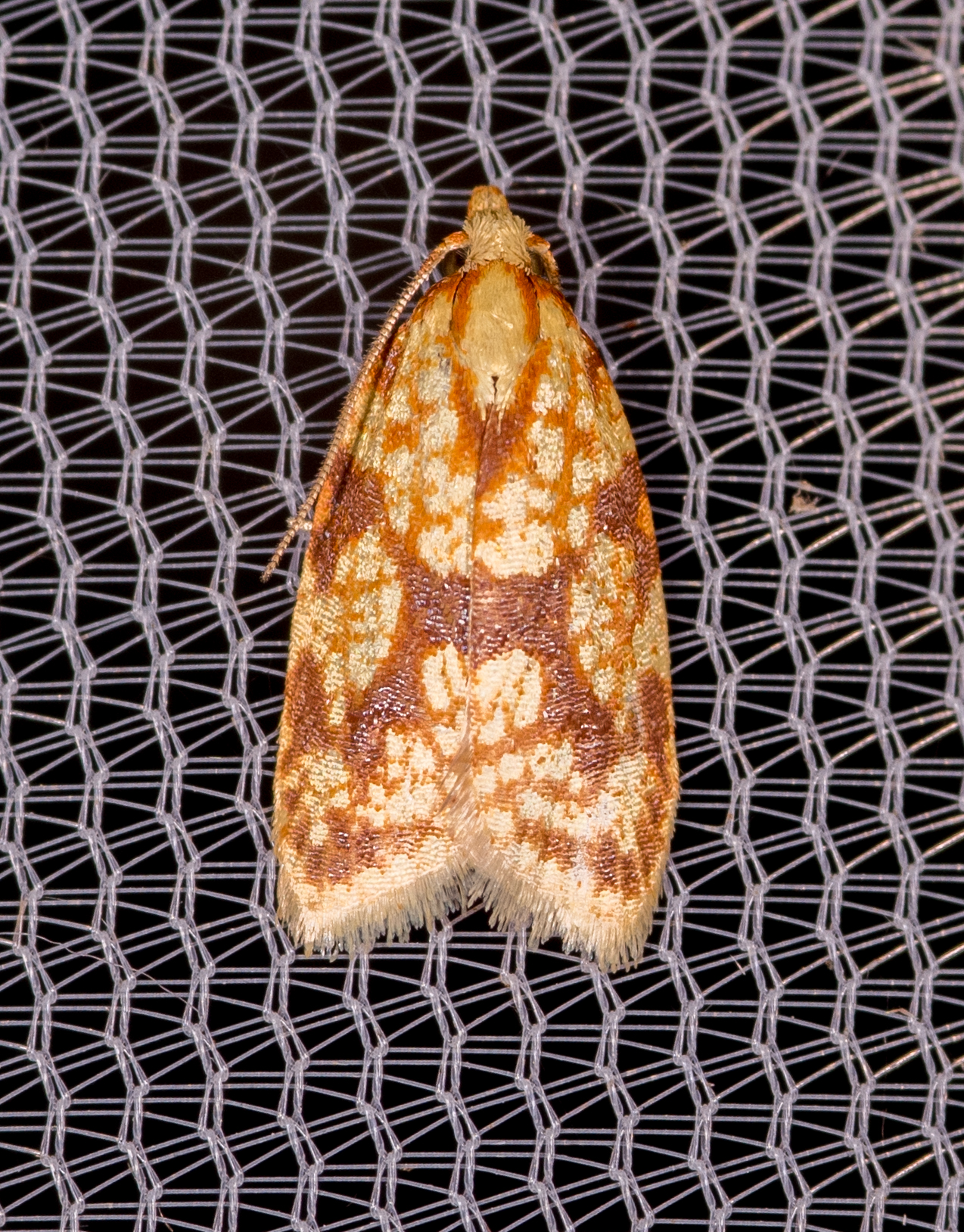

Scientific classification
- Kingdom: Animalia
- Phylum: Arthropoda
- Clade: Pancrustacea
- Class: Insecta
- Order: Lepidoptera
- Family: Tortricidae
- Genus: Sparganothis
- Species: S. sulfureana

Binomial name
- Sparganothis sulfureana (Clemens, 1860)

Synonyms
- Croesia sulfureana Clemens, 1860; Tortrix (Dichelia) sulfureana var. belfrageana Zeller, 1875; Sparganothis euphronopa Meyrick, 1927; Croesia fulvoroseana Clemens, 1864; Croesia gallivorana Clemens, 1864; Conchylis gratana Walker, 1863; Croesia virgineana Zeller, 1875; Croesia virginiana Clemens, 1864

= Sparganothis sulfureana =

Species of moth

Sparganothis sulfureana, the sparganothis fruitworm moth or blueberry leafroller, is a species of moth of the family Tortricidae. It is found in most of eastern North America and on Cuba.

The wingspan is 10–20 mm.

The larvae feed on various forbs and woody plants, including corn and cranberry.
