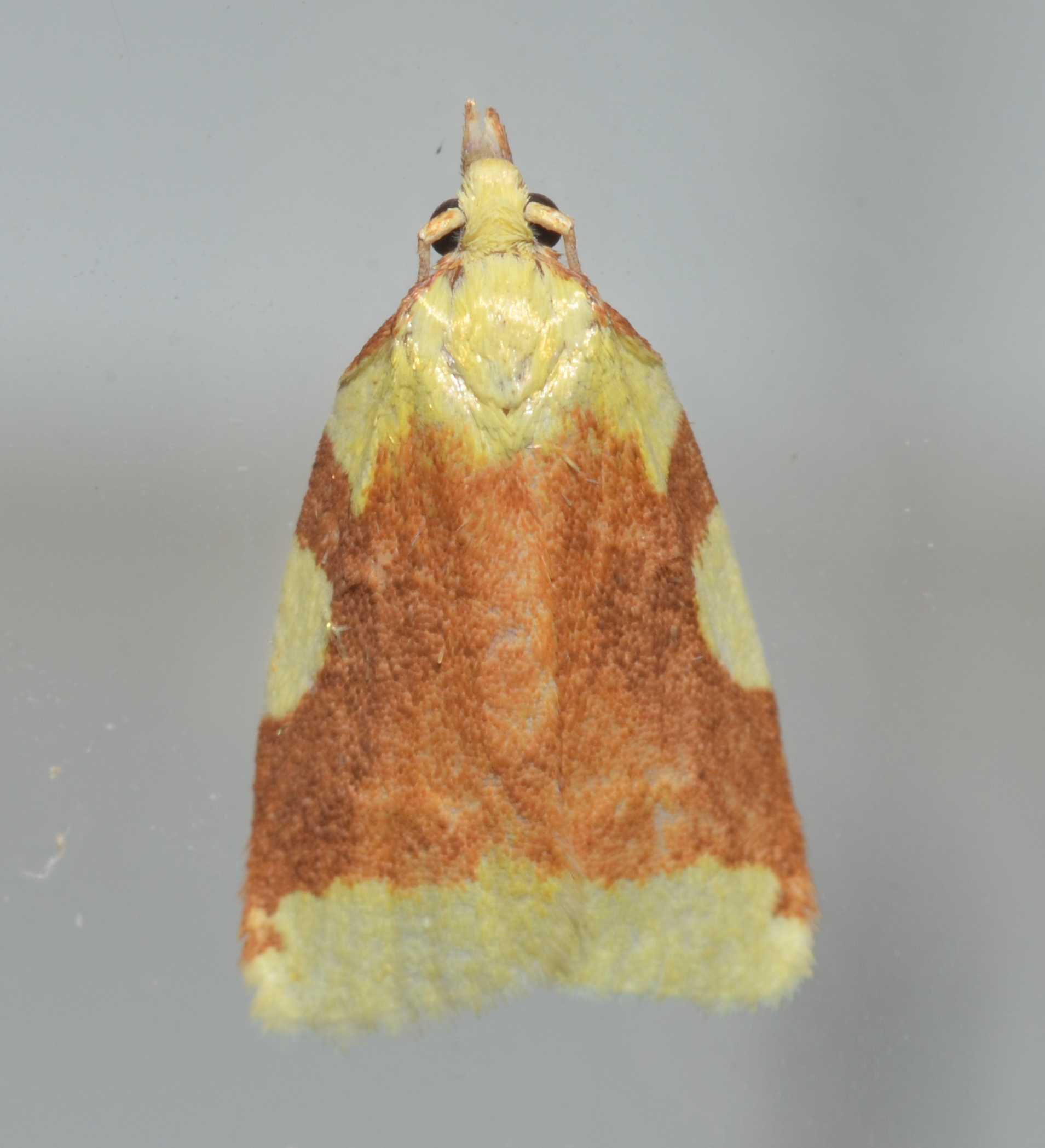

Scientific classification
- Domain: Eukaryota
- Kingdom: Animalia
- Phylum: Arthropoda
- Class: Insecta
- Order: Lepidoptera
- Family: Tortricidae
- Genus: Sparganothis
- Species: S. niveana

Binomial name
- Sparganothis niveana (Walsingham, 1879)

Synonyms
- Cenopis niveana Walsingham, 1879; Cenopis groteana Fernald, 1882

= Sparganothis niveana =

Species of moth

Sparganothis niveana, the aproned cenopis moth, is a species of moth of the family Tortricidae. It is found in south-eastern Canada and the eastern part of the United States.

The wingspan is about 17 mm. Adults are on wing from June to August.
