= Sparganothis mesospila =

Scientific classification
- Kingdom: Animalia
- Phylum: Arthropoda
- Clade: Pancrustacea
- Class: Insecta
- Order: Lepidoptera
- Family: Tortricidae
- Genus: Sparganothis
- Species: S. mesospila

Binomial name
- Sparganothis mesospila (Zeller, 1875)

Synonyms
- Cenopis mesospila Zeller, 1875; Cenopis reticulatana var. mesospila Zeller, 1875; Sparganothis albicaudana Busck, 1915

Species of moth

Sparganothis mesospila, the white-tailed fruitworm moth, is a species of moth of the family Tortricidae. It is found in eastern North America, including Connecticut, Illinois, Indiana, Kentucky, Maine, Maryland, Massachusetts, Michigan, New York, Ohio, Ontario, Pennsylvania, Quebec, Tennessee and West Virginia.

The wingspan is 15–17 mm.

The larvae feed on Acer species. They feed inside a rolled leaf.
