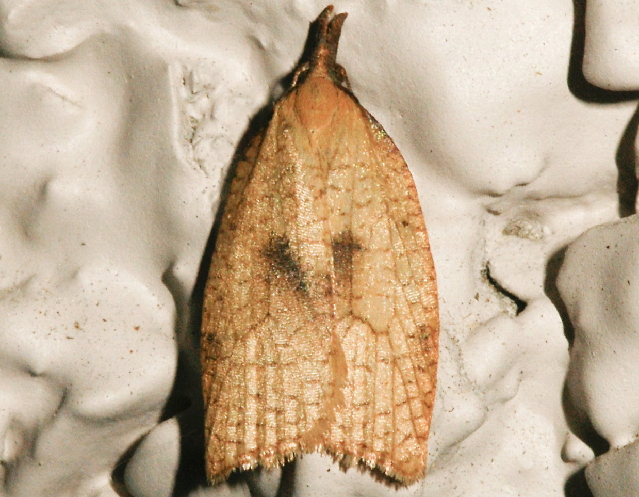

Scientific classification
- Kingdom: Animalia
- Phylum: Arthropoda
- Class: Insecta
- Order: Lepidoptera
- Family: Tortricidae
- Genus: Sparganothis
- Species: S. xanthoides

Binomial name
- Sparganothis xanthoides (Walker, 1863)

Synonyms
- Begunna xanthoides Walker, 1863; Leptoris breviornatana Clemens, 1865; Oenectra inconditana Walsingham, 1879; Tortrix irrorea Robinson, 1869

= Sparganothis xanthoides =

Species of moth

Sparganothis xanthoides, the mosaic sparganothis moth, is a species of moth of the family Tortricidae. It is found in most of North America, including Alberta, Arizona, British Columbia, California, Colorado, Connecticut, Idaho, Illinois, Indiana, Kentucky, Maine, Manitoba, Maryland, Massachusetts, Michigan, Nebraska, New Brunswick, New Hampshire, New Jersey, New York, Newfoundland, North Carolina, the Northwest Territory, Nova Scotia, Ohio, Ontario, Oregon, Pennsylvania, Quebec, Saskatchewan, South Carolina, Virginia, Washington, West Virginia, Wisconsin and Wyoming.

The wingspan is 17–21 mm.

The larvae have been recorded feeding on Lotus corniculatus.
