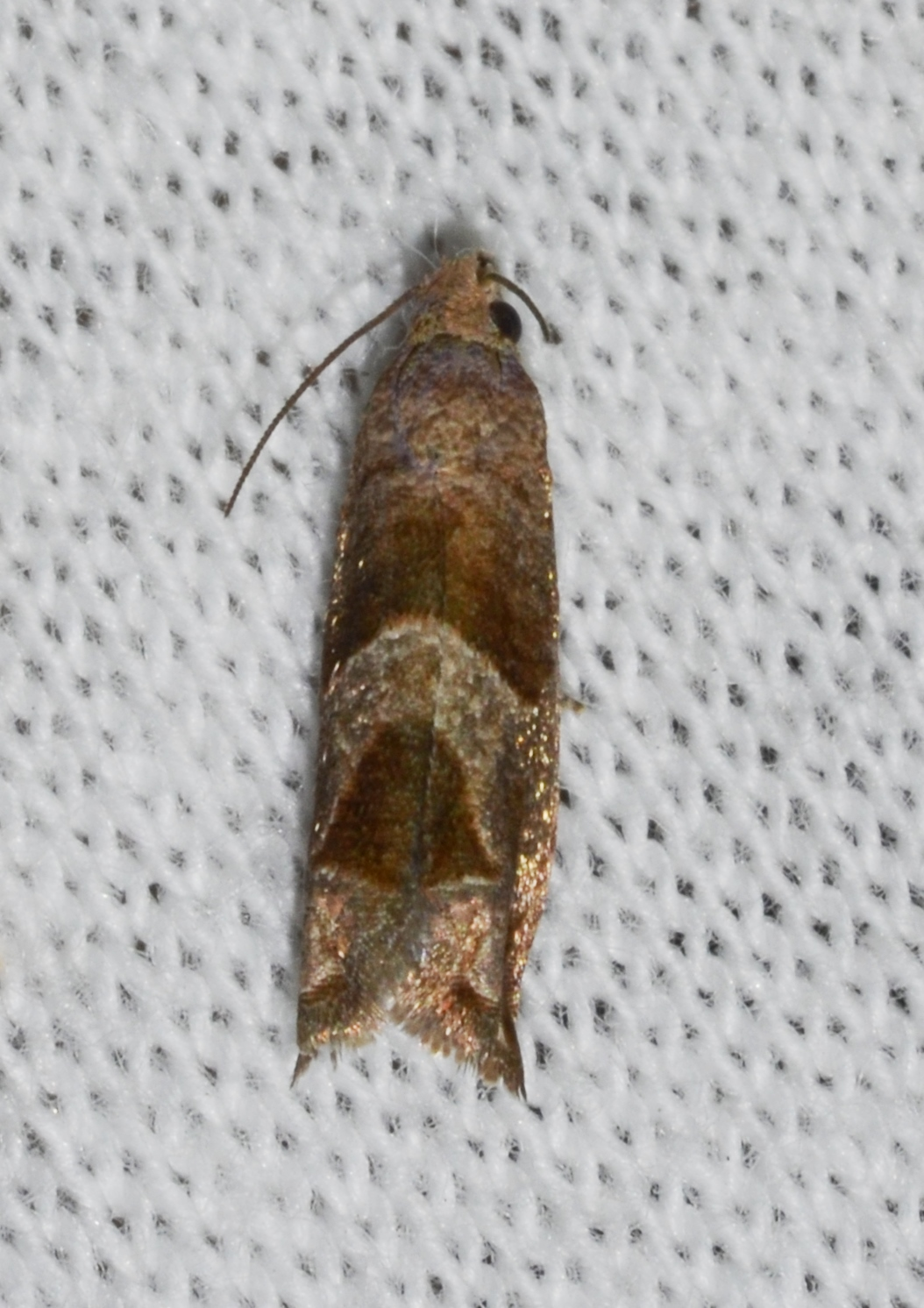

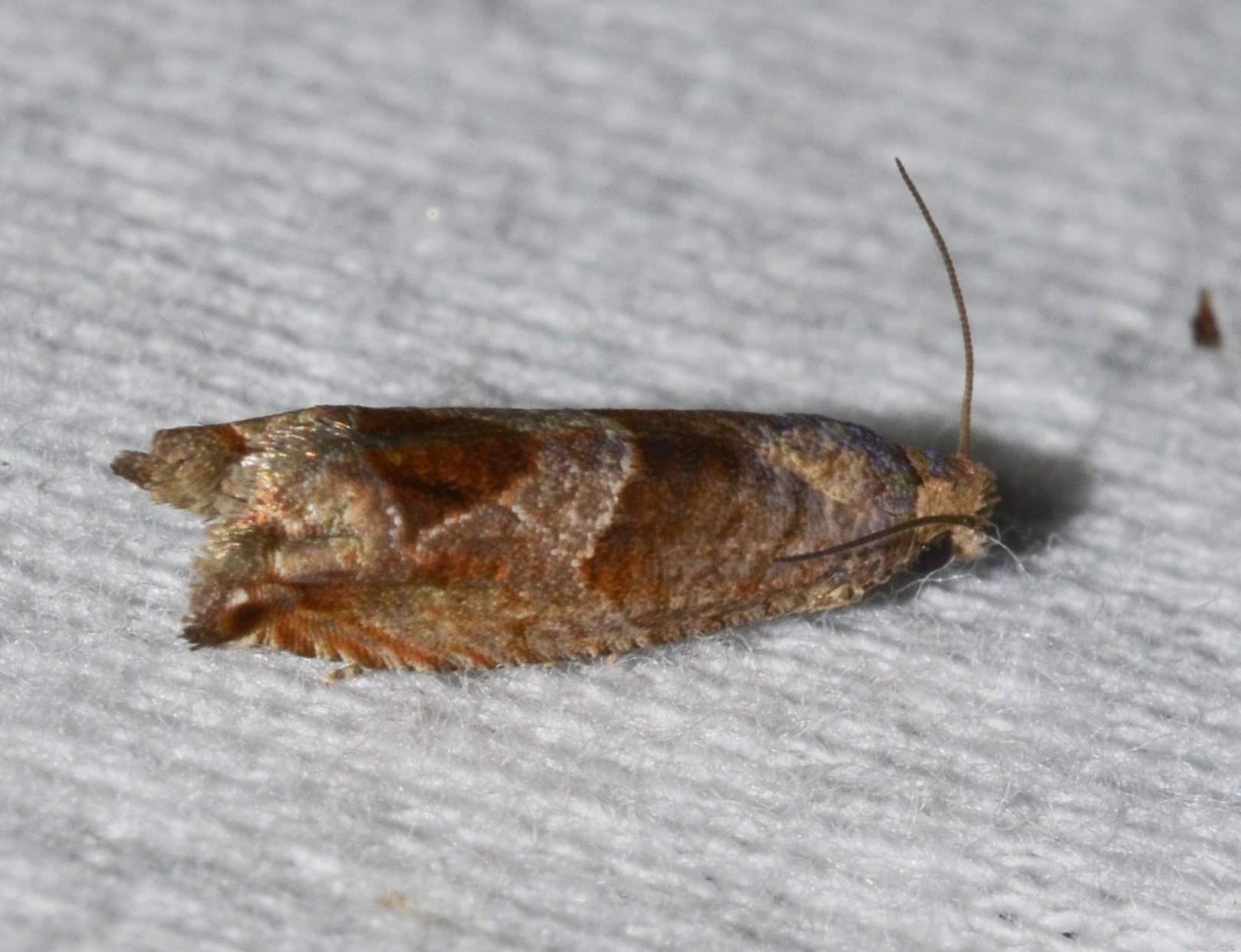

Scientific classification
- Domain: Eukaryota
- Kingdom: Animalia
- Phylum: Arthropoda
- Class: Insecta
- Order: Lepidoptera
- Family: Tortricidae
- Genus: Sonia
- Species: S. paraplesiana

Binomial name
- Sonia paraplesiana Blanchard, 1979

= Sonia paraplesiana =

Species of moth

Sonia paraplesiana, the Hebrew sonia moth, is a species of moth of the family Tortricidae. It is found in the United States, where it has been recorded from Alabama, Florida, Georgia, Illinois, Kentucky, Maryland, North Carolina, Ohio, South Carolina, Tennessee and West Virginia.

The wingspan is 14 mm. Adults are on wing from March to October.
