= William D. Kearfott =

American entomologist

- Born: January 12, 1864; Berkeley County, West Virginia
- Died: November 12, 1917 (aged 53); Montclair, New Jersey
- Scientific career
- Fields: Entomology

William D. Kearfott (January 12, 1864 – November 12, 1917) was an American engineer and amateur entomologist. Kearfott was educated in primary schools in Richmond and Philadelphia and was connected with the Morton Poole Company and the International Navigation Company in his early career. Kearfott was also associated with the Worthington Steam Pump Company and was considered an authority on his branch of engineering.

Kearfott worked on Lepidoptera, especially Tortricidae, and built up a large collection. Kearfott was known for his peculiar approach to naming new species.
