= Sevilla Don Bosco Canton =

Sevilla Don Bosco
- Canton
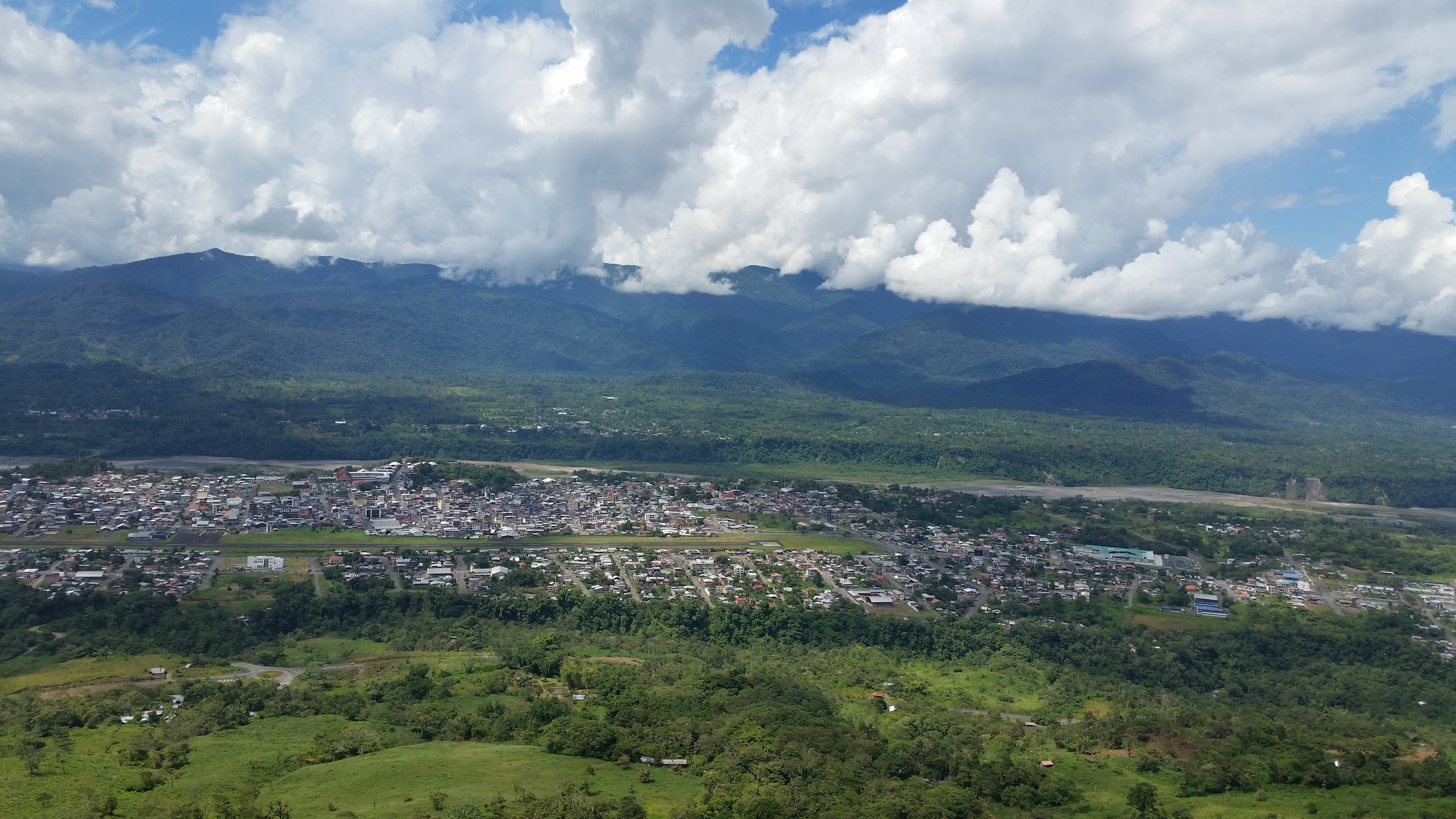
- View looking east over Macas and the Upano River towards Sevilla Don Bosco

- Location of Sevilla Don Bosco
- Coordinates: 2.3°S 78.1°W
- Country: Ecuador
- Province: Morona Santiago
- Established: 5 November 2024
- Seat: Sevilla Don Bosco

Area
  - Total: 2,246.35 km^{2} (867.32 sq mi)

Population (November 2022 Census)
  - Total: 18,647
  - Density: 8.3010/km^{2} (21.500/sq mi)
- Time zone: UTC-5 (ECT)
- Postal code: 140103

Sevilla Don Bosco is a canton in the Ecuadorian province of Morona Santiago. It is located about 240 kilometres (150 mi) south of Quito, the national capital. Established in 2024, it is Ecuador's newest canton.

== Geography ==
Sevilla Don Bosco is located in the Ecuadorian Amazon on the east bank of the Upano River across from Macas, the capital of Morona Santiago. From there it extends east and south into the Cordillera de Kutukú. It borders the canton of Huamboya to the north, the parish of Cuchaentza (an exclave of Morona) to the northeast, and the cantons of Taisha to the east, Tiwintza to the south, Logroño to the southwest, Sucúa to the west, and the main part of Morona to the northwest.

The Cordillera de Kutukú has been designated an Important Bird Area and it lies within the boundaries of the Kutukú-Shaimi Protective Forest. The sustainable management of the Forest is led by the indigenous Shuar people, but the Forest is also completely covered by mining concessions.

== History ==
The Upano Valley site of Kilamope is located in the present-day boundaries of Sevilla Don Bosco. Active between 500 BCE and 300–600 CE, the Upano Valley cultures are currently the earliest urbanized agrarian societies known to have existed in the Amazon rainforest.

In 1576, acting on orders from Juan de Salinas y Loyola, Captain José de Villanueva Maldonado founded the settlement of Sevilla de Oro on the east bank of the Upano River, which was the source of the first part of Sevilla Don Bosco's name. In 1599, Sevilla de Oro was destroyed by the Shuar people.

In 1929, the Salesians of Don Bosco at the mission of Macas started visiting the Shuar on the east bank of the Upano. They founded the mission of Sevilla Don Bosco on 2 May 1943. On 28 May 1958, the parish of Sevilla Don Bosco was established in the province of Morona Santiago.

In 2019, Sevilla Don Bosco's parish government petitioned the office of the president of Ecuador to start the process of converting the parish into a canton, after two earlier requests to do so had failed. In 2022, the president asked the Constitutional Court of Ecuador to rule on the constitutionality of the proposed referendum on the issue, which the court approved. On 5 February 2023, 82.66% of Sevilla Don Bosco's population voted in favour of becoming a canton. On 10 October 2024, the National Assembly approved the conversion of Sevilla Don Bosco into Ecuador's 222nd canton, which went into force on 5 November 2024. Sevilla Don Bosco is scheduled to hold its first elections as an independent canton on 17 August 2025.

== Demographics ==
In the 2022 Ecuadorian Census, the then-parish of Sevilla Don Bosco recorded a population of 18,647 inhabitants. Sevilla Don Bosco includes over forty settlements, of which 85% are Shuar communities.

== Economy ==
Sevilla Don Bosco's economy is primarily based on agriculture, and its main exports are cassava and malanga. The Shuar continue to carry out subsistence farming, hunting and fishing activities in the forest, and are developing initiatives to attract sustainable tourism.
