= Nase Lino =

Ecuadorian Achuar filmmaker and writer

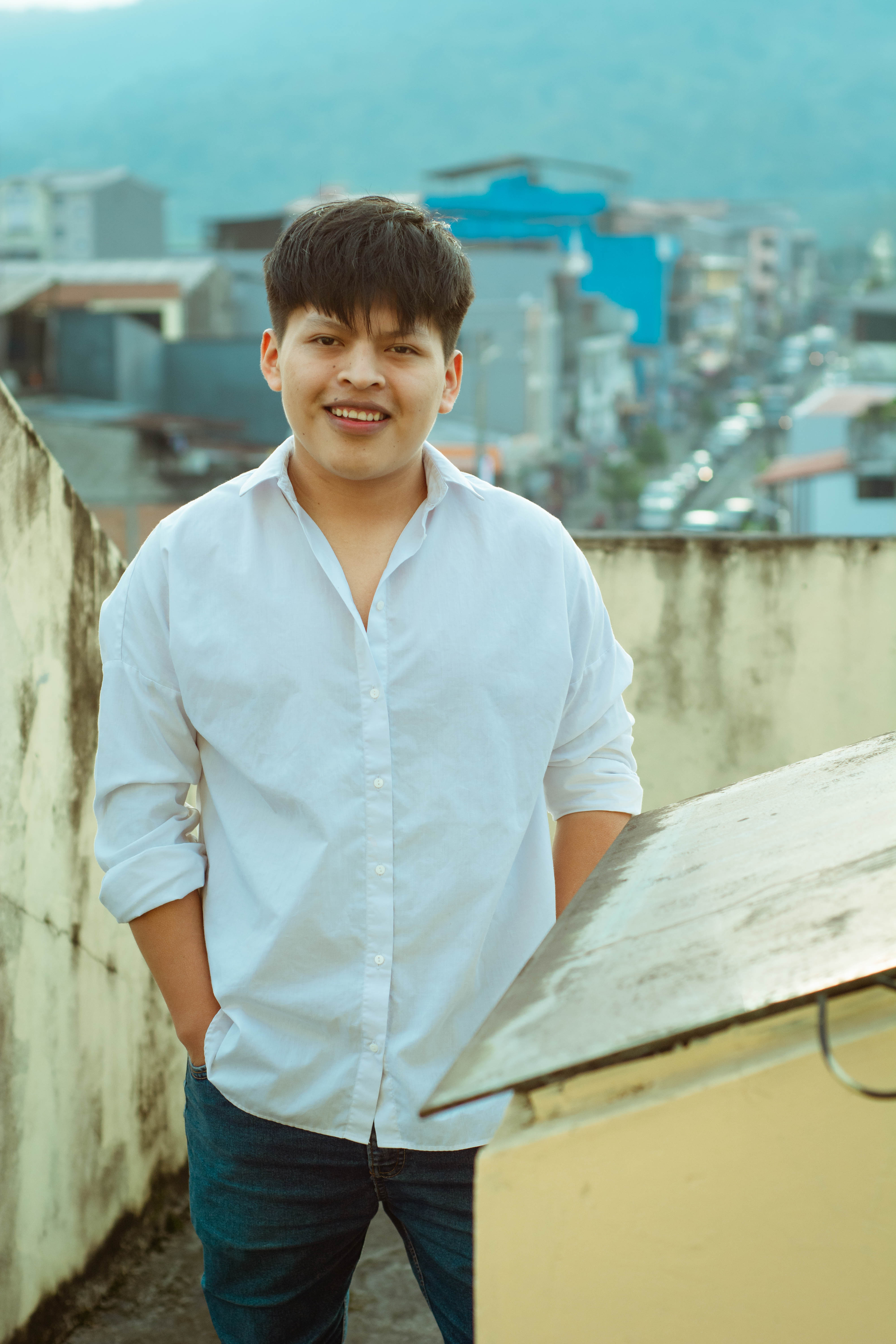
- Nase Lino in 2023
- Born: Nase Lino Sumpinanch Tiriats; 14 February 2000 (age 26); Huasaga, Ecuador
- Education: State University of Milagro
- Occupations: Filmmaker; communicator

Nase Lino Sumpinanch Tiriats (Ecuador, February 14, 2000) is an Ecuadorian filmmaker, writer, and communicator of Achuar nationality, dedicated to audiovisual and documentary production about the Amazon.

== Biography ==
Nase was born on February 14, 2000, in the community of Huasaga, located in Taisha canton, Morona Santiago Province, Ecuador. He belongs to the Achuar nationality. During his childhood, he lived in his native community and later moved to the city of Puyo, where he continued his basic education.

He later lived in other cities in Ecuador, including Riobamba, as part of his academic training and personal development. He grew up in an Amazonian community environment, in close contact with the cultural practices, traditions, and ways of life of his people, which have influenced the themes addressed in his audiovisual production. His interest in cinema emerged after the death of his grandmother, an event that motivated him to document the life and traditions of his people through images, with the aim of preserving their cultural memory over time.

He studied Communication at the State University of Milagro (UNEMI). His training in the audiovisual field has been largely self-taught, developed through hands-on experience in content production, filming, and editing.

Since his teenage years, he began creating audiovisual content on digital platforms, including videoblogs and independent productions. He later focused his work on documentary filmmaking, developing projects centered on cultural practices, spirituality, and territory in the Ecuadorian Amazon.

== Work and recognition ==
Among his works is Taking Ayahuasca (Achuar) (2023), a documentary about an ancestral practice of his community, as well as other productions related to Amazonian life and environment.

His most notable work is The River of the Spirits (2024), co-directed with the Tawna collective, which portrays the worldview and social dynamics of the Achuar people through a narrative built from within the territory.

The film has been screened in international venues, including the Museum of Modern Art (MoMA) in New York City, and in 2026 it was selected to participate in the international documentary film festival Visions du Réel, in Nyon (Switzerland), within the International Medium-Length and Short Film Competition.
