= Orthocomotis parattonsa =

Scientific classification
- Kingdom: Animalia
- Phylum: Arthropoda
- Class: Insecta
- Order: Lepidoptera
- Family: Tortricidae
- Genus: Orthocomotis
- Species: O. parattonsa

Binomial name
- Orthocomotis parattonsa Razowski & Pelz, 2003

Species of moth

Orthocomotis parattonsa is a species of moth of the family Tortricidae. It is found in Morona-Santiago Province, Ecuador.

== Appearance ==
The wingspan is generally around 20 mm. The color of the forewings is cream, suffused with pale brownish orange and brownish. The hindwings are dark brown.

== Etymology ==
The species is named for the Shuar people who live in the region around Macas.
