= Orthocomotis expansa =

Scientific classification
- Kingdom: Animalia
- Phylum: Arthropoda
- Class: Insecta
- Order: Lepidoptera
- Family: Tortricidae
- Genus: Orthocomotis
- Species: O. expansa

Binomial name
- Orthocomotis expansa Razowski, 1999

Species of moth

Orthocomotis expansa is a species of moth of the family Tortricidae. It is found in Ecuador in Carchi and Morona-Santiago provinces.
