= Orthocomotis albimarmorea =

Scientific classification
- Kingdom: Animalia
- Phylum: Arthropoda
- Class: Insecta
- Order: Lepidoptera
- Family: Tortricidae
- Genus: Orthocomotis
- Species: O. albimarmorea

Binomial name
- Orthocomotis albimarmorea Razowski & Wojtusiak, 2006

Species of moth

Orthocomotis albimarmorea is a species of moth of the family Tortricidae. It is found in Morona-Santiago Province, Ecuador.

The wingspan is about 26 mm (1.0 in).
