= Orthocomotis longuncus =

Scientific classification
- Kingdom: Animalia
- Phylum: Arthropoda
- Class: Insecta
- Order: Lepidoptera
- Family: Tortricidae
- Genus: Orthocomotis
- Species: O. longuncus

Binomial name
- Orthocomotis longuncus Razowski & Pelz, 2003

Species of moth

Orthocomotis longuncus is a species of moth of the family Tortricidae. It is found in Ecuador in Morona-Santiago and Tungurahua provinces.
