= Huasaga =

Rural parish in Ecuador

Coordinates: 2°32′S 77°07′W

Parroquia Huasaga Wampuik Achuar Huasaga
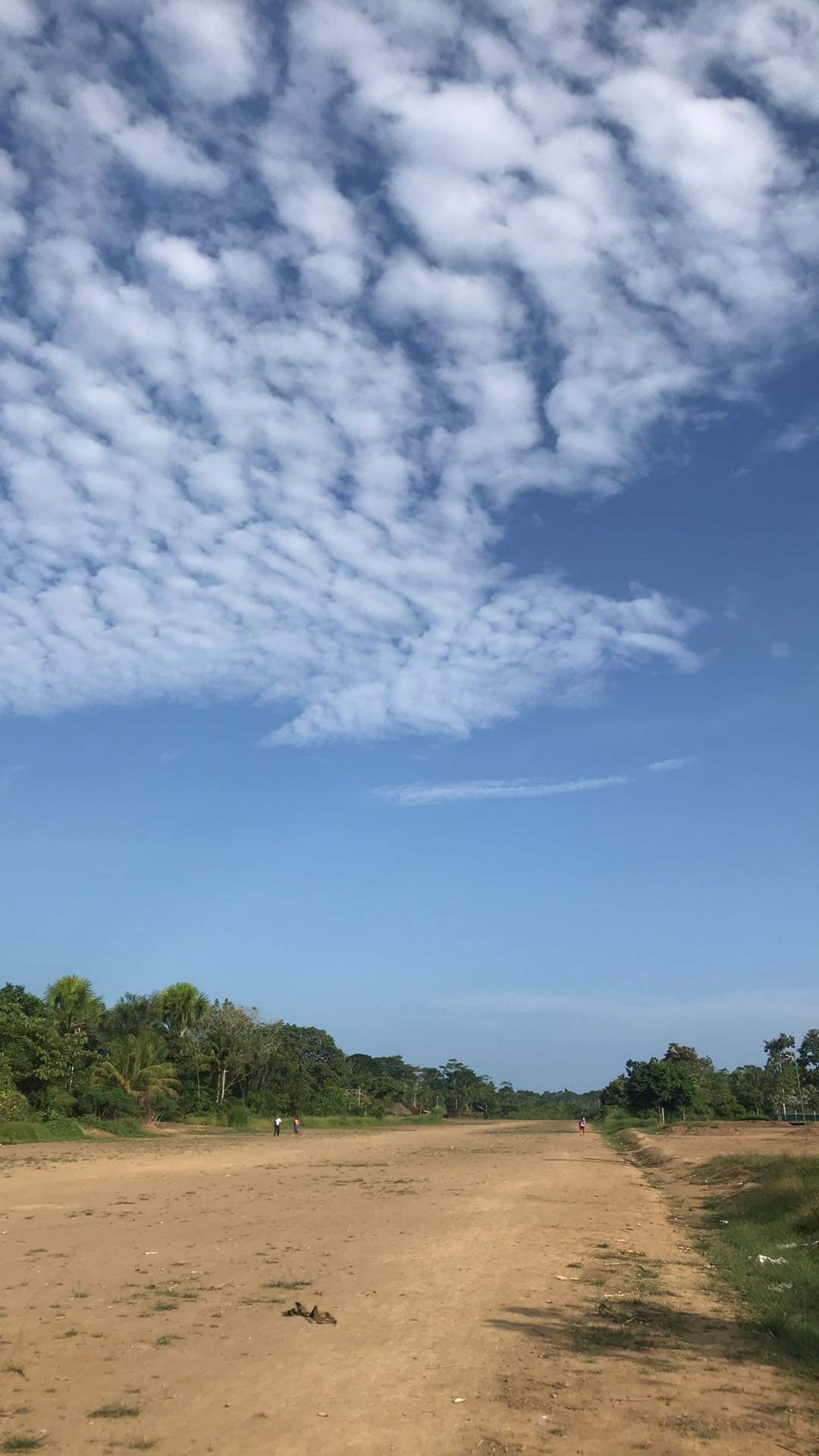
- Interactive map of Parroquia Huasaga

Huasaga, also known as Cab. en Wampuik, is a rural parish located in the Taisha canton of Morona Santiago Province, in the Amazon region of Ecuador. The parish was officially established on February 20, 1989, and covers an area of 124,574.89 hectares. The population of the parish is estimated to be around 2,000 inhabitants, according to data from the National Institute of Statistics and Censuses (INEC) of Ecuador.

== Geography and climate ==
Huasaga is located at an altitude of 450 meters above sea level and has a humid tropical climate with rainfall throughout the year. The parish is surrounded by the Huasaga, Pastaza, and Morona rivers, which are important sources of water and life for the region.

== History ==
The Wampuik community, currently known as the main town of Huasaga, was founded in 1969 by a group of people led by Vicente Senkuan, Taki Senkuan, Kayap Shimpiu, Saap Shimpiu, Tarir Tiriats, and Chayat Jirnant. These inhabitants of the region resided on the banks of the Wampuik River and, with the arrival of the missionary Luis Bolla, actively participated in the process of creating the Huasaga parish.

The community and other residents of the area were involved in the creation of the parish, which was finally officialized as one of the five parishes of the Taisha Canton on February 20, 1989. This is why the Wampuik community has been considered the main town of Huasaga.

== Economy ==
The economy of Huasaga is mainly based on agriculture, fishing, and handicrafts. The parish has a wide variety of agricultural products, such as plantains, cassava, papayas, oranges, and pineapples. Fishing is another important activity in the area, and the local rivers are rich in diverse fish species.

== Culture and tourism ==
Huasaga is known for its rich biodiversity and for being part of the Amazon region of Ecuador, characterized by its lush vegetation and wildlife. Additionally, this parish is home to various Achuar ethnic groups, who maintain their ancestral traditions and customs. Tourists can visit the area to explore nature and the local culture, enjoy fishing and other outdoor activities, and purchase crafts and local products in the markets and shops of the area.
