= Orthocomotis euchaldera =

Scientific classification
- Domain: Eukaryota
- Kingdom: Animalia
- Phylum: Arthropoda
- Class: Insecta
- Order: Lepidoptera
- Family: Tortricidae
- Genus: Orthocomotis
- Species: O. euchaldera

Binomial name
- Orthocomotis euchaldera Clarke, 1956

Synonyms
- Orthocomotis domonoana Razowski & Pelz, 2003

Species of moth

Orthocomotis euchaldera is a species of moth of the family Tortricidae. It is found in Colombia, Ecuador (Morona-Santiago Province, Napo Province, Pichincha Province) and Peru.

== Subspecies ==
- Orthocomotis euchaldera euchaldera (Colombia)
- Orthocomotis euchaldera domonoana Razowski & Pelz, 2003 (Ecuador: Morona-Santiago Province)
