= Orthocomotis alshiana =

Scientific classification
- Kingdom: Animalia
- Phylum: Arthropoda
- Class: Insecta
- Order: Lepidoptera
- Family: Tortricidae
- Genus: Orthocomotis
- Species: O. alshiana

Binomial name
- Orthocomotis alshiana Razowski, Pelz & Wojtusiak, 2007

Species of moth

Orthocomotis alshiana is a species of moth of the family Tortricidae. It is found in Morona-Santiago Province, Ecuador.

The wingspan is 24 mm.
