= Solanum bellum =

Conservation status
- Near Threatened (IUCN 3.1)

Scientific classification
- Kingdom: Plantae
- Clade: Embryophytes
- Clade: Tracheophytes
- Clade: Angiosperms
- Clade: Eudicots
- Clade: Asterids
- Order: Solanales
- Family: Solanaceae
- Genus: Solanum
- Species: S. bellum

Binomial name
- Solanum bellum S.Knapp

Species of flowering plant

Solanum bellum is a species of flowering plant in the family Solanaceae. It is endemic to Ecuador.

== Taxonomy ==
The species was first scientifically described by the American botanist Sandra Knapp in 1986. The species epithet bellum (from the Latin for "beautiful") refers to the plant's delicate, attractive appearance.

The species belongs to section Geminata of the genus Solanum, and is closely related to a group of small-flowered species from Colombia's Chocó region, including S. triplinervium. It is the only member of this group found on the eastern slopes of the Andes.

== Description ==
Solanum bellum is a delicate shrub or slender small tree growing to 1–3 m (3 ft 3 in – 9 ft 10 in) in height. Its young stems are smooth (glabrous), shiny and green, developing grey bark as they age. The species features simple leaves arranged singly along the stem (unifoliate), rather than in pairs. These leaves are lance-shaped to elliptical, measuring 8–16 cm (3.1–6.3 in) long and 2–5 cm (0.8–2.0 in) wide, with a pointed tip and base. The leaves are smooth on both surfaces, with the underside distinctly paler than the upper surface.

The flowers are small and white, appearing in simple clusters opposite the leaves. Each flower cluster (inflorescence) is quite short at 3–5 mm long, bearing 3–6 flowers. Individual flowers measure 4–5 mm across, with petals that fold backwards when fully open. The flowers can be either 'long-styled' or 'short-styled', referring to the length of the female reproductive organ (pistil) within the flower.

The fruit is a round, green berry approximately 1 cm (0.4 in) in diameter, held on woody stalks that stand upright. When growing in full sunlight, its leaves develop a distinctive silvery sheen, a characteristic that sets it apart from related species.

== Habitat and distribution ==
Solanum bellum occurs in wet forest understory at elevations between 900 and 1,500 m (3,000 and 4,900 ft). The species is endemic to eastern Ecuador, where it is known from only three localities within about 100 km (62 mi) of each other in the middle Pastaza River drainage basin. It has been collected near Palora, along the Río Metzera Grande, and on the western slopes of the Cordillera de Cutucú. Additional populations may exist at higher altitudes in the Cutucú and Huacamayos mountain ranges.

== Conservation ==
Solanum bellum is classified as Near Threatened on the IUCN Red List. While no specific threats have been identified beyond habitat destruction, the species' conservation status is concerning as it is not known to occur within any of Ecuador's protected areas. However, researchers believe it may be present in Sumaco Napo-Galeras National Park and possibly Yasuní National Park, though this has not been confirmed. The species' conservation status was last assessed in 2004 and has been flagged as needing updating.

== See also ==
- List of Solanum species
