= Gravitcornutia inapulana =

Scientific classification
- Kingdom: Animalia
- Phylum: Arthropoda
- Class: Insecta
- Order: Lepidoptera
- Family: Tortricidae
- Genus: Gravitcornutia
- Species: G. inapulana

Binomial name
- Gravitcornutia inapulana Razowski & Pelz, 2003

Species of moth

Gravitcornutia inapulana is a species of moth of the family Tortricidae. It is found in Morona-Santiago Province, Ecuador.
