= Orthocomotis parexpansa =

Scientific classification
- Kingdom: Animalia
- Phylum: Arthropoda
- Class: Insecta
- Order: Lepidoptera
- Family: Tortricidae
- Genus: Orthocomotis
- Species: O. parexpansa

Binomial name
- Orthocomotis parexpansa Razowski, Pelz & Wojtusiak, 2007

Species of moth

Orthocomotis parexpansa is a species of moth of the family Tortricidae. It is found in Ecuador in the provinces of Carchi, Morona-Santiago and Pichincha.

The wingspan is 20–28 mm.
