= Gauruncus armatus =

Scientific classification
- Kingdom: Animalia
- Phylum: Arthropoda
- Class: Insecta
- Order: Lepidoptera
- Family: Tortricidae
- Genus: Gauruncus
- Species: G. armatus

Binomial name
- Gauruncus armatus Razowski & Pelz, 2006

Species of moth

Gauruncus armatus is a species of moth of the family Tortricidae. It is found in Morona-Santiago Province, Ecuador.

The wingspan is 17 mm.
