= Anthurium bushii =

Conservation status
- Endangered (IUCN 3.1)

Scientific classification
- Kingdom: Plantae
- Clade: Tracheophytes
- Clade: Angiosperms
- Clade: Monocots
- Order: Alismatales
- Family: Araceae
- Genus: Anthurium
- Species: A. bushii

Binomial name
- Anthurium bushii Croat

Species of flowering plant

Anthurium bushii is a species of plant in the arum family, Araceae. It is endemic to Ecuador. It is known only from the type locality in Morona-Santiago Province. It is an epiphyte which grows in the forests of the lower Andes.
