= Yaupi =

- Town
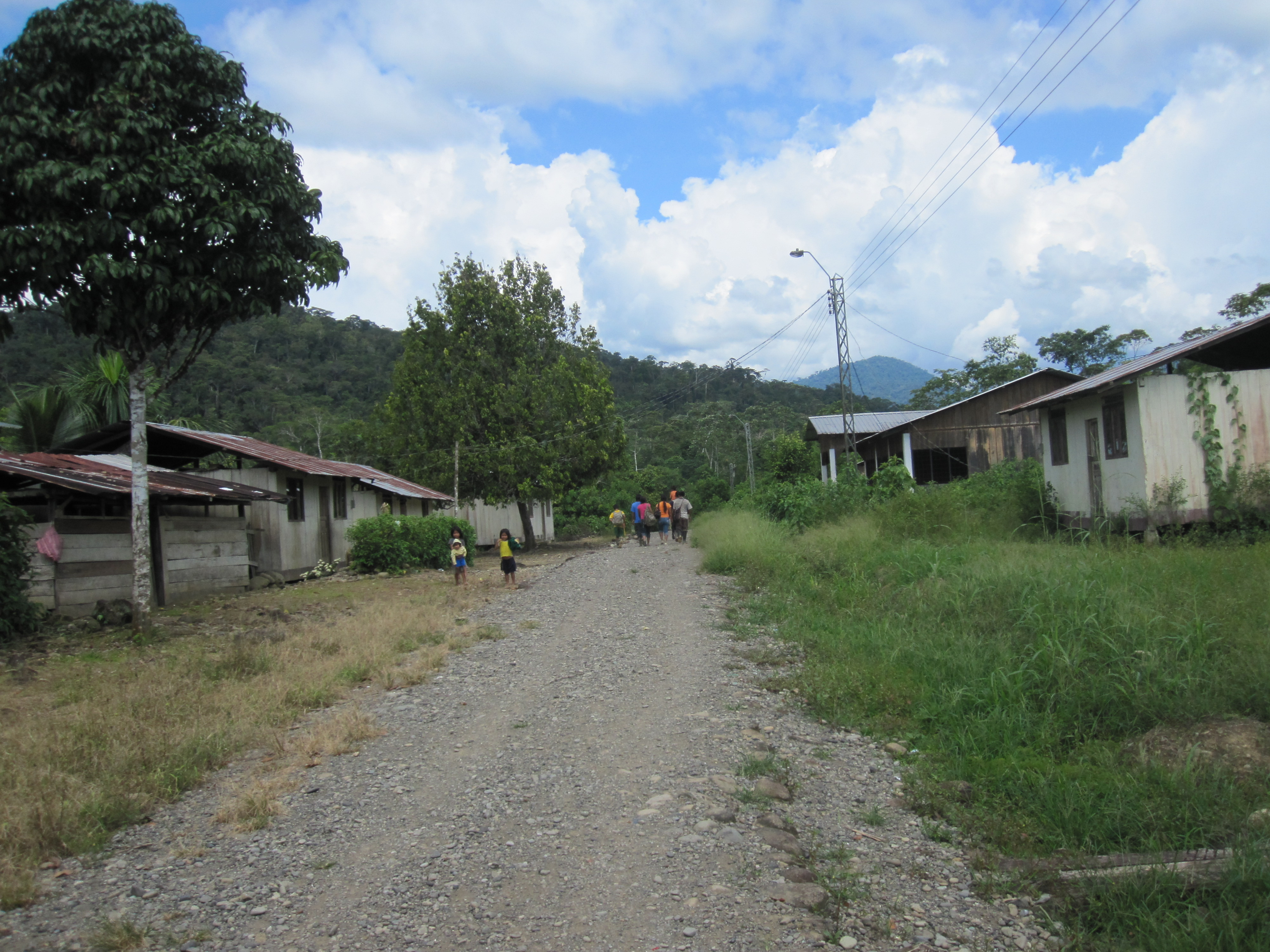

- Location within Ecuador
- Coordinates: 2.8379°S 77.9357°W
- Country: Ecuador
- Province: Morona Santiago
- Canton: Logroño Canton
- Parish: Yaupi Parish
- Time zone: UTC-5 (ECT)
- Climate: Af

Yaupi is a primarily Shuar village with a few hundred residents in the province of Morona Santiago, Logroño Canton, Yaupi Parish, Ecuador.
