= Gauruncus laudatus =

Scientific classification
- Kingdom: Animalia
- Phylum: Arthropoda
- Clade: Pancrustacea
- Class: Insecta
- Order: Lepidoptera
- Family: Tortricidae
- Genus: Gauruncus
- Species: G. laudatus

Binomial name
- Gauruncus laudatus Razowski & Pelz, 2003

Species of moth

Gauruncus laudatus is a species of moth of the family Tortricidae. It is known from the Morona-Santiago Province in Ecuador.
