= Orthocomotis mediana =

Scientific classification
- Kingdom: Animalia
- Phylum: Arthropoda
- Class: Insecta
- Order: Lepidoptera
- Family: Tortricidae
- Genus: Orthocomotis
- Species: O. mediana

Binomial name
- Orthocomotis mediana Razowski, Pelz & Wojtusiak, 2007

Species of moth

Orthocomotis mediana is a species of moth of the family Tortricidae. It is found in Ecuador (Tungurahua Province, Pichincha Province, Napo Province, Morona-Santiago Province) and Peru.

The wingspan is 21–24.5 mm.
