= Gauruncus simplicissimus =

Scientific classification
- Kingdom: Animalia
- Phylum: Arthropoda
- Clade: Pancrustacea
- Class: Insecta
- Order: Lepidoptera
- Family: Tortricidae
- Genus: Gauruncus
- Species: G. simplicissimus

Binomial name
- Gauruncus simplicissimus Razowski & Pelz, 2003

Species of moth

Gauruncus simplicissimus is a species of moth of the family Tortricidae. It is known from the Morona-Santiago and Tungurahua Provinces in Ecuador.
