= Orthocomotis andina =

Scientific classification
- Kingdom: Animalia
- Phylum: Arthropoda
- Class: Insecta
- Order: Lepidoptera
- Family: Tortricidae
- Genus: Orthocomotis
- Species: O. andina

Binomial name
- Orthocomotis andina Razowski, Pelz & Wojtusiak, 2007

Species of moth

Orthocomotis andina is a species of moth of the family Tortricidae. It is found in Ecuador (Napo Province, Morona-Santiago Province, Carchi Province, Sucumbíos Province).

The wingspan is 26–28 mm.
