= Gauruncus gracilis =

Scientific classification
- Kingdom: Animalia
- Phylum: Arthropoda
- Class: Insecta
- Order: Lepidoptera
- Family: Tortricidae
- Genus: Gauruncus
- Species: G. gracilis

Binomial name
- Gauruncus gracilis Razowski & Pelz, 2006

Species of moth

Gauruncus gracilis is a species of moth of the family Tortricidae. It is found in Bolivia and Ecuador (Morona-Santiago Province).

The wingspan is 12.5 mm.
