= Gualaquiza =

- Town
- Location within Ecuador
- Coordinates: 3°22′48″S 78°34′48″W
- Country: Ecuador
- Province: Morona Santiago
- Canton: Gualaquiza Canton

Area
  - Town: 6.45 km^{2} (2.49 sq mi)

Population (2022 census)
  - Town: 9,157
  - Density: 1,420/km^{2} (3,680/sq mi)
- Climate: Af

Gualaquiza is a town in the Morona Santiago province of Ecuador. It is the seat of the Gualaquiza Canton.

== Other sources ==
- World-Gazetteer.com
- https://web.archive.org/web/20110722011621/http://www.volunteeringecuador.info/morona-santiago/gualaquiza.html
