= Orthocomotis grandisocia =

Scientific classification
- Kingdom: Animalia
- Phylum: Arthropoda
- Class: Insecta
- Order: Lepidoptera
- Family: Tortricidae
- Genus: Orthocomotis
- Species: O. grandisocia

Binomial name
- Orthocomotis grandisocia Razowski, 1999

Species of moth

Orthocomotis grandisocia is a species of moth of the family Tortricidae. It is found in Ecuador in Carchi and Sucumbíos provinces.
