= Gravitcornutia cornuta =

Scientific classification
- Kingdom: Animalia
- Phylum: Arthropoda
- Clade: Pancrustacea
- Class: Insecta
- Order: Lepidoptera
- Family: Tortricidae
- Genus: Gravitcornutia
- Species: G. cornuta

Binomial name
- Gravitcornutia cornuta Razowski & Becker, 2001

Species of moth

Gravitcornutia cornuta is a species of moth of the family Tortricidae. It is found in Minas Gerais, Brazil.
