= Gravitcornutia rhomboidea =

Scientific classification
- Kingdom: Animalia
- Phylum: Arthropoda
- Clade: Pancrustacea
- Class: Insecta
- Order: Lepidoptera
- Family: Tortricidae
- Genus: Gravitcornutia
- Species: G. rhomboidea

Binomial name
- Gravitcornutia rhomboidea Razowski & Becker, 2010

Species of moth

Gravitcornutia rhomboidea is a species of moth of the family Tortricidae. It is found in São Paulo, Brazil. It was first identified there in 1987.

The wingspan is 13 mm.
