= Orthocomotis volochilesia =

Scientific classification
- Kingdom: Animalia
- Phylum: Arthropoda
- Class: Insecta
- Order: Lepidoptera
- Family: Tortricidae
- Genus: Orthocomotis
- Species: O. volochilesia

Binomial name
- Orthocomotis volochilesia Razowski, Pelz & Wojtusiak, 2007

Species of moth

Orthocomotis volochilesia is a species of moth of the family Tortricidae. It is found in Carchi Province, Ecuador.

The wingspan is 26 mm.

== Etymology ==
The species name refers to the Volcan Chiles Massive.
