= Gravitcornutia bertioga =

Scientific classification
- Kingdom: Animalia
- Phylum: Arthropoda
- Clade: Pancrustacea
- Class: Insecta
- Order: Lepidoptera
- Family: Tortricidae
- Genus: Gravitcornutia
- Species: G. bertioga

Binomial name
- Gravitcornutia bertioga Razowski & Becker, 2010

Species of moth

Gravitcornutia bertioga is a species of moth of the family Tortricidae. It is found in São Paulo, Brazil.

The wingspan is 9 mm.

== Etymology ==
The species name refers to the type locality, Bertioga.
