= Gravitcornutia minima =

Scientific classification
- Kingdom: Animalia
- Phylum: Arthropoda
- Clade: Pancrustacea
- Class: Insecta
- Order: Lepidoptera
- Family: Tortricidae
- Genus: Gravitcornutia
- Species: G. minima

Binomial name
- Gravitcornutia minima Razowski & Becker, 2010

Species of moth

Gravitcornutia minima is a species of moth of the family Tortricidae. It is found in Brazil.

The wingspan is 8 mm.
