= Orthocomotis ochrosaphes =

Scientific classification
- Kingdom: Animalia
- Phylum: Arthropoda
- Class: Insecta
- Order: Lepidoptera
- Family: Tortricidae
- Genus: Orthocomotis
- Species: O. ochrosaphes

Binomial name
- Orthocomotis ochrosaphes Clarke, 1956

Species of moth

Orthocomotis ochrosaphes is a species of moth of the family Tortricidae. It is found in Santa Catarina, Brazil.
