= Gravitcornutia camacae =

Scientific classification
- Kingdom: Animalia
- Phylum: Arthropoda
- Clade: Pancrustacea
- Class: Insecta
- Order: Lepidoptera
- Family: Tortricidae
- Genus: Gravitcornutia
- Species: G. camacae

Binomial name
- Gravitcornutia camacae Razowski & Becker, 2010

Species of moth

Gravitcornutia camacae is a species of moth of the family Tortricidae. It is found in Bahia, Brazil.

The wingspan is 10.5 mm.

== Etymology ==
The species name refers to the type locality.
