= Orthocomotis yanayacu =

Scientific classification
- Kingdom: Animalia
- Phylum: Arthropoda
- Class: Insecta
- Order: Lepidoptera
- Family: Tortricidae
- Genus: Orthocomotis
- Species: O. yanayacu

Binomial name
- Orthocomotis yanayacu Razowski, Pelz & Wojtusiak, 2007

Species of moth

Orthocomotis yanayacu is a species of moth of the family Tortricidae. It is found in Napo Province, Ecuador.

The wingspan is about 25.5 mm.

== Etymology ==
The species name refers to the name of the reservation where the species was first collected, Yanayacu.
