= Orthocomotis chaldera =

Scientific classification
- Domain: Eukaryota
- Kingdom: Animalia
- Phylum: Arthropoda
- Class: Insecta
- Order: Lepidoptera
- Family: Tortricidae
- Genus: Orthocomotis
- Species: O. chaldera

Binomial name
- Orthocomotis chaldera (Druce, 1889)

Synonyms
- Grammophora chaldera Druce, 1889

Species of moth

Orthocomotis chaldera is a species of moth of the family Tortricidae. It is found from Tamaulipas in Mexico, through Costa Rica to Peru, Colombia and Ecuador.
