= Orthocomotis olivata =

Scientific classification
- Domain: Eukaryota
- Kingdom: Animalia
- Phylum: Arthropoda
- Class: Insecta
- Order: Lepidoptera
- Family: Tortricidae
- Genus: Orthocomotis
- Species: O. olivata

Binomial name
- Orthocomotis olivata Dognin, 1905

Species of moth

Orthocomotis olivata is a species of moth of the family Tortricidae. It is found in Colombia.
