= Orthocomotis puyoana =

Scientific classification
- Kingdom: Animalia
- Phylum: Arthropoda
- Class: Insecta
- Order: Lepidoptera
- Family: Tortricidae
- Genus: Orthocomotis
- Species: O. puyoana

Binomial name
- Orthocomotis puyoana Razowski, Pelz & Wojtusiak, 2007

Species of moth

Orthocomotis puyoana is a species of moth of the family Tortricidae. It is found in Pastaza Province, Ecuador.

The wingspan is 19 mm.

== Etymology ==
The species name refers to the type locality, Puyo.
