= Orthocomotis albobasalis =

Scientific classification
- Kingdom: Animalia
- Phylum: Arthropoda
- Class: Insecta
- Order: Lepidoptera
- Family: Tortricidae
- Genus: Orthocomotis
- Species: O. albobasalis

Binomial name
- Orthocomotis albobasalis Razowski, Pelz & Wojtusiak, 2007

Species of moth

Orthocomotis albobasalis is a species of moth of the family Tortricidae. It is found in Loja Province, Ecuador.

The wingspan is 26–29 mm.
