= Gravitcornutia cearae =

Scientific classification
- Kingdom: Animalia
- Phylum: Arthropoda
- Clade: Pancrustacea
- Class: Insecta
- Order: Lepidoptera
- Family: Tortricidae
- Genus: Gravitcornutia
- Species: G. cearae

Binomial name
- Gravitcornutia cearae Razowski & Becker, 2010

Species of moth

Gravitcornutia cearae is a species of moth of the family Tortricidae. It is found in Ceará, Brazil.

The wingspan is 10 mm (0.39 in).

== Etymology ==
The species name refers to the state of Ceará.
