= Orthocomotis ochracea =

Scientific classification
- Domain: Eukaryota
- Kingdom: Animalia
- Phylum: Arthropoda
- Class: Insecta
- Order: Lepidoptera
- Family: Tortricidae
- Genus: Orthocomotis
- Species: O. ochracea

Binomial name
- Orthocomotis ochracea Clarke, 1956

Species of moth

Orthocomotis ochracea is a species of moth of the family Tortricidae. It is found from Guatemala and Costa Rica to Ecuador and Venezuela.
