= Orthocomotis similis =

Scientific classification
- Domain: Eukaryota
- Kingdom: Animalia
- Phylum: Arthropoda
- Class: Insecta
- Order: Lepidoptera
- Family: Tortricidae
- Genus: Orthocomotis
- Species: O. similis

Binomial name
- Orthocomotis similis Brown, 2003

Species of moth

Orthocomotis similis is a species of moth of the family Tortricidae. It is found in Costa Rica.

The length of the forewings 10.5-12.5 mm.
