= Orthocomotis marmorobrunnea =

Scientific classification
- Domain: Eukaryota
- Kingdom: Animalia
- Phylum: Arthropoda
- Class: Insecta
- Order: Lepidoptera
- Family: Tortricidae
- Genus: Orthocomotis
- Species: O. marmorobrunnea

Binomial name
- Orthocomotis marmorobrunnea Razowski & Wojtusiak, 2006

Species of moth

Orthocomotis marmorobrunnea is a species of moth of the family Tortricidae. It is found in Ecuador (Morona-Santiago Province, Pichincha Province and Napo Province).

The wingspan is 27–32 millimetres (1.1–1.3 in).

== Etymology ==
The species name refers to the brown, marble-like marking.
