= Gravitcornutia strigulata =

Scientific classification
- Kingdom: Animalia
- Phylum: Arthropoda
- Clade: Pancrustacea
- Class: Insecta
- Order: Lepidoptera
- Family: Tortricidae
- Genus: Gravitcornutia
- Species: G. strigulata

Binomial name
- Gravitcornutia strigulata Razowski & Becker, 2010

Species of moth

Gravitcornutia strigulata is a species of moth of the family Tortricidae. It is found in Rio de Janeiro, Brazil.

The wingspan is 14 mm.

== Etymology ==
The species' name refers to forewing markings and is derived from Latin strigulata (meaning strigulated).
