= Orthocomotis miranda =

Scientific classification
- Domain: Eukaryota
- Kingdom: Animalia
- Phylum: Arthropoda
- Class: Insecta
- Order: Lepidoptera
- Family: Tortricidae
- Genus: Orthocomotis
- Species: O. miranda

Binomial name
- Orthocomotis miranda Razowski & Wojtusiak, 2011

Species of moth

Orthocomotis miranda is a species of moth of the family Tortricidae. It is found in the Cordillera Occidental of Colombia.

The wingspan is 29 mm.
