= Gravitcornutia latiloba =

Scientific classification
- Kingdom: Animalia
- Phylum: Arthropoda
- Clade: Pancrustacea
- Class: Insecta
- Order: Lepidoptera
- Family: Tortricidae
- Genus: Gravitcornutia
- Species: G. latiloba

Binomial name
- Gravitcornutia latiloba Razowski & Becker, 2010

Species of moth

Gravitcornutia latiloba is a species of moth of the family Tortricidae. It is found in Mato Grosso, Brazil.

The wingspan is 10 mm.
