= Orthocomotis magicana =

Scientific classification
- Kingdom: Animalia
- Phylum: Arthropoda
- Clade: Pancrustacea
- Class: Insecta
- Order: Lepidoptera
- Family: Tortricidae
- Genus: Orthocomotis
- Species: O. magicana

Binomial name
- Orthocomotis magicana (Zeller, 1866)

Synonyms
- Pentina (Sericoris) magicana Zeller, 1866

Species of moth

Orthocomotis magicana is a species of moth of the family Tortricidae. It is found in Costa Rica, Colombia and Venezuela.
