= Orthocomotis herbaria =

Scientific classification
- Domain: Eukaryota
- Kingdom: Animalia
- Phylum: Arthropoda
- Class: Insecta
- Order: Lepidoptera
- Family: Tortricidae
- Genus: Orthocomotis
- Species: O. herbaria

Binomial name
- Orthocomotis herbaria (Busck, 1920)

Synonyms
- Sociphora herbaria Busck, 1920; Orthocomotis cristata Clarke, 1956; Orthocomotis uragia Razowski & Becker, 1990

Species of moth

Orthocomotis herbaria is a species of moth of the family Tortricidae. It is found from Guatemala to Costa Rica. It has also been recorded from Bolivia.
