= Orthocomotis lactistrigata =

Scientific classification
- Kingdom: Animalia
- Phylum: Arthropoda
- Class: Insecta
- Order: Lepidoptera
- Family: Tortricidae
- Genus: Orthocomotis
- Species: O. lactistrigata

Binomial name
- Orthocomotis lactistrigata Razowski, Pelz & Wojtusiak, 2007

Species of moth

Orthocomotis lactistrigata is a species of moth of the family Tortricidae. It is found in Carchi Province, Ecuador.

The wingspan is 15 mm.
