= Gauruncus gampsognathos =

Scientific classification
- Domain: Eukaryota
- Kingdom: Animalia
- Phylum: Arthropoda
- Class: Insecta
- Order: Lepidoptera
- Family: Tortricidae
- Genus: Gauruncus
- Species: G. gampsognathos

Binomial name
- Gauruncus gampsognathos Razowski, 1988

Synonyms
- Gauruncus gampsognatos Razowski, 1988

Species of moth

Gauruncus gampsognathos is a species of moth of the family Tortricidae. It is found in Bolivia, Ecuador (Napo Province) and Peru.
