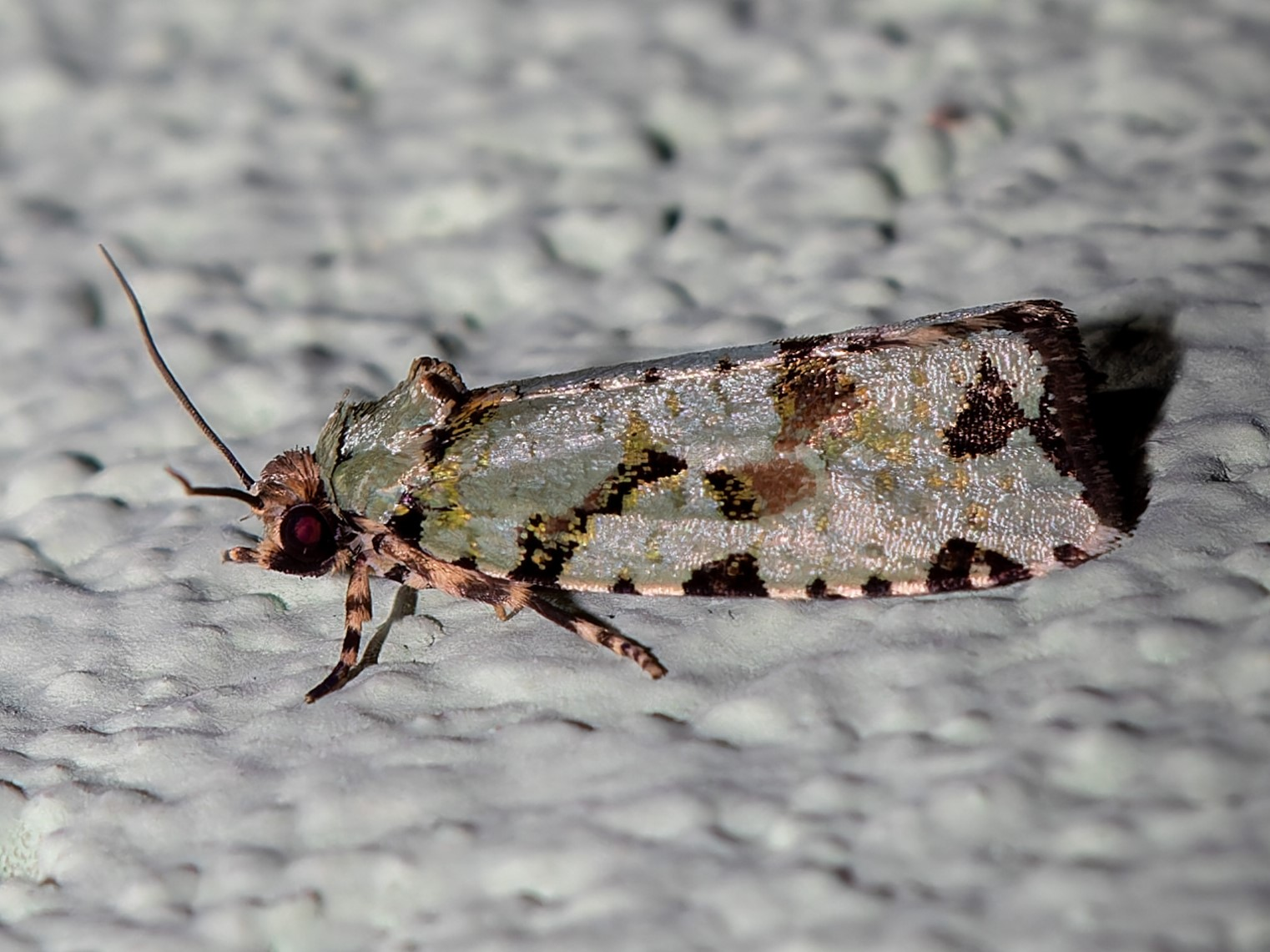

Scientific classification
- Kingdom: Animalia
- Phylum: Arthropoda
- Clade: Pancrustacea
- Class: Insecta
- Order: Lepidoptera
- Family: Tortricidae
- Genus: Orthocomotis
- Species: O. mareda

Binomial name
- Orthocomotis mareda Clarke, 1956

Synonyms
- Orthocomotis jordani Clarke, 1956

= Orthocomotis mareda =

Species of moth

Orthocomotis mareda is a species of moth that belongs to the family Tortricidae. It is found in Santa Catarina, Brazil.
