= Gravitcornutia sterigmaspis =

Scientific classification
- Kingdom: Animalia
- Phylum: Arthropoda
- Clade: Pancrustacea
- Class: Insecta
- Order: Lepidoptera
- Family: Tortricidae
- Genus: Gravitcornutia
- Species: G. sterigmaspis

Binomial name
- Gravitcornutia sterigmaspis Razowski & Becker, 2001

Species of moth

Gravitcornutia sterigmaspis is a species of moth of the family Tortricidae. It is found in Goias, Brazil.
