= Gravitcornutia =

Scientific classification
- Kingdom: Animalia
- Phylum: Arthropoda
- Clade: Pancrustacea
- Class: Insecta
- Order: Lepidoptera
- Family: Tortricidae
- Tribe: Euliini
- Genus: Gravitcornutia; Razowski & Becker, 2001

Genus of tortrix moths

Gravitcornutia is a genus of moths belonging to the family Tortricidae.

== Species ==
- Gravitcornutia aethesiana Razowski & Becker, 2001
- Gravitcornutia altoperuviana Razowski & Wojtusiak, 2010
- Gravitcornutia artificiosa Razowski & Becker, 2001
- Gravitcornutia basiceramea Razowski & Becker, 2010
- Gravitcornutia bertioga Razowski & Becker, 2010
- Gravitcornutia camacae Razowski & Becker, 2010
- Gravitcornutia caracae Razowski & Becker, 2010
- Gravitcornutia cearae Razowski & Becker, 2010
- Gravitcornutia cinnamomea Razowski & Becker, 2001
- Gravitcornutia constricta Razowski & Becker, 2010
- Gravitcornutia cornuta Razowski & Becker, 2001
- Gravitcornutia curiosa Razowski & Becker, 2001
- Gravitcornutia cuspis Razowski & Pelz, 2003
- Gravitcornutia goianica Razowski & Becker, 2001
- Gravitcornutia inapulana Razowski & Pelz, 2003
- Gravitcornutia latiloba Razowski & Becker, 2010
- Gravitcornutia major Razowski & Becker, 2001
- Gravitcornutia minima Razowski & Becker, 2010
- Gravitcornutia miserana Razowski & Becker, 2001
- Gravitcornutia nasifera Razowski & Becker, 2010
- Gravitcornutia nigribasana Razowski & Becker, 2001
- Gravitcornutia ochrata Razowski & Becker, 2001
- Gravitcornutia recta Razowski & Becker, 2010
- Gravitcornutia rhomboidea Razowski & Becker, 2010
- Gravitcornutia sodalicia Razowski & Becker, 2010
- Gravitcornutia sterigmaspis Razowski & Becker, 2001
- Gravitcornutia strigulata Razowski & Becker, 2010
- Gravitcornutia trespolitana Razowski & Becker, 2001
- Gravitcornutia tristis Razowski & Becker, 2001
- Gravitcornutia umbrosa Razowski & Becker, 2001
- Gravitcornutia zonata Razowski & Becker, 2001

== See also ==
- List of Tortricidae genera
