= Xoser astonyx =

Scientific classification
- Domain: Eukaryota
- Kingdom: Animalia
- Phylum: Arthropoda
- Class: Insecta
- Order: Lepidoptera
- Family: Tortricidae
- Genus: Xoser
- Species: X. astonyx

Binomial name
- Xoser astonyx Razowski & Wojtusiak, 2010

Species of moth

Xoser astonyx is a species of moth of the family Tortricidae found in Napo Province, Ecuador.

The wingspan is about 15 mm.
