= Gauruncus intermedius =

Scientific classification
- Kingdom: Animalia
- Phylum: Arthropoda
- Clade: Pancrustacea
- Class: Insecta
- Order: Lepidoptera
- Family: Tortricidae
- Genus: Gauruncus
- Species: G. intermedius

Binomial name
- Gauruncus intermedius Razowski & Becker, 2002

Species of moth

Gauruncus intermedius is a species of moth of the family Tortricidae. It is endemic to Ecuador (Tungurahua Province).
