= Gauruncus curvatus =

Scientific classification
- Kingdom: Animalia
- Phylum: Arthropoda
- Class: Insecta
- Order: Lepidoptera
- Family: Tortricidae
- Genus: Gauruncus
- Species: G. curvatus

Binomial name
- Gauruncus curvatus Razowski & Pelz, 2006

Species of moth

Gauruncus curvatus is a species of moth of the family Tortricidae. It is found in Ecuador (Napo Province).

The wingspan is 19 millimetres (0.75 in).
