= Gauruncus rossi =

Scientific classification
- Kingdom: Animalia
- Phylum: Arthropoda
- Clade: Pancrustacea
- Class: Insecta
- Order: Lepidoptera
- Family: Tortricidae
- Genus: Gauruncus
- Species: G. rossi

Binomial name
- Gauruncus rossi Razowski & Pelz, 2006

Species of moth

Gauruncus rossi is a species of moth of the family Tortricidae. It is found in Bolivia and Pichincha Province, Ecuador.

The wingspan is 17.5 mm.

== Etymology ==
The species is named in honour of Mr. Dana Ross who supported the research of the authors with specimens collected at Reserva Las Gralarias.
