= Orthocomotis ferruginea =

Scientific classification
- Kingdom: Animalia
- Phylum: Arthropoda
- Class: Insecta
- Order: Lepidoptera
- Family: Tortricidae
- Genus: Orthocomotis
- Species: O. ferruginea

Binomial name
- Orthocomotis ferruginea Razowski, Pelz & Wojtusiak, 2007

Species of moth

Orthocomotis ferruginea is a species of moth of the family Tortricidae. It is found in Ecuador in Napo and Loja provinces.

The wingspan is 26–28 mm.

== Etymology ==
The species name refers to the orange rust elements of the wing pattern and is derived from Latin ferrugineus (meaning rust coloured).
