= Gravitcornutia artificiosa =

Scientific classification
- Kingdom: Animalia
- Phylum: Arthropoda
- Clade: Pancrustacea
- Class: Insecta
- Order: Lepidoptera
- Family: Tortricidae
- Genus: Gravitcornutia
- Species: G. artificiosa

Binomial name
- Gravitcornutia artificiosa Razowski & Becker, 2001

Species of moth

Gravitcornutia artificiosa is a species of moth of the family Tortricidae. It is found in Brazil in the Federal District and the states of Rio de Janeiro, São Paulo and Minas Gerais.
