= Orthocomotis chlamyda =

Scientific classification
- Domain: Eukaryota
- Kingdom: Animalia
- Phylum: Arthropoda
- Class: Insecta
- Order: Lepidoptera
- Family: Tortricidae
- Genus: Orthocomotis
- Species: O. chlamyda

Binomial name
- Orthocomotis chlamyda Razowski & Wojtusiak, 2006

Species of moth

Orthocomotis chlamyda is a species of moth of the family Tortricidae. It is found in Venezuela.

The wingspan is 22 mm.
