= Gauruncus gelastes =

Scientific classification
- Domain: Eukaryota
- Kingdom: Animalia
- Phylum: Arthropoda
- Class: Insecta
- Order: Lepidoptera
- Family: Tortricidae
- Genus: Gauruncus
- Species: G. gelastes

Binomial name
- Gauruncus gelastes Razowski, 1988

Species of moth

Gauruncus gelastes is a species of moth of the family Tortricidae. It is found in Argentina.
