= Orthocomotis benedeki =

Scientific classification
- Domain: Eukaryota
- Kingdom: Animalia
- Phylum: Arthropoda
- Class: Insecta
- Order: Lepidoptera
- Family: Tortricidae
- Genus: Orthocomotis
- Species: O. benedeki

Binomial name
- Orthocomotis benedeki Razowski & Wojtusiak, 2013

Species of moth

Orthocomotis benedeki is a species of moth of the family Tortricidae. It is found in Peru.

The wingspan is 30 mm.

== Etymology ==
The species is named for its collector Dr. B. Benedek.
