= Orthocomotis boscantica =

Scientific classification
- Domain: Eukaryota
- Kingdom: Animalia
- Phylum: Arthropoda
- Class: Insecta
- Order: Lepidoptera
- Family: Tortricidae
- Genus: Orthocomotis
- Species: O. boscantica

Binomial name
- Orthocomotis boscantica (Dognin, 1912)

Synonyms
- Tortrix boscantica Dognin, 1912

Species of moth

Orthocomotis boscantica is a species of moth of the family Tortricidae. It is found in Colombia.
