= Orthocomotis sucumbiana =

Scientific classification
- Kingdom: Animalia
- Phylum: Arthropoda
- Class: Insecta
- Order: Lepidoptera
- Family: Tortricidae
- Genus: Orthocomotis
- Species: O. sucumbiana

Binomial name
- Orthocomotis sucumbiana Razowski, Pelz & Wojtusiak, 2007

Species of moth

Orthocomotis sucumbiana is a species of moth of the family Tortricidae. It is found in Sucumbíos Province, Ecuador.

The wingspan is 22 mm.

== Etymology ==
The species name refers to the name of Sucumbíos Province.
