= Orthocomotis aphanisma =

Scientific classification
- Kingdom: Animalia
- Phylum: Arthropoda
- Clade: Pancrustacea
- Class: Insecta
- Order: Lepidoptera
- Family: Tortricidae
- Genus: Orthocomotis
- Species: O. aphanisma

Binomial name
- Orthocomotis aphanisma Razowski & Becker, 1990

Species of moth

Orthocomotis aphanisma is a species of moth of the family Tortricidae. It is found in Veracruz, Mexico.
