= Orthocomotis phenax =

Scientific classification
- Kingdom: Animalia
- Phylum: Arthropoda
- Clade: Pancrustacea
- Class: Insecta
- Order: Lepidoptera
- Family: Tortricidae
- Genus: Orthocomotis
- Species: O. phenax

Binomial name
- Orthocomotis phenax (Razowski & Becker, 1990)

Synonyms
- Orthoomotis phenax Razowski & Becker, 1990

Species of moth

Orthocomotis phenax is a species of moth of the family Tortricidae. It is found in Mexico (Veracruz) and Costa Rica.

== Subspecies ==
- Orthocomotis phenax phenax (Costa Rica)
- Orthocomotis phenax phobetica Razowski & Becker, 1990 (Mexico: Veracruz)
