= Orthocomotis oxapampae =

Scientific classification
- Domain: Eukaryota
- Kingdom: Animalia
- Phylum: Arthropoda
- Class: Insecta
- Order: Lepidoptera
- Family: Tortricidae
- Genus: Orthocomotis
- Species: O. oxapampae

Binomial name
- Orthocomotis oxapampae Razowski & Wojtusiak, 2010

Species of moth

Orthocomotis oxapampae is a species of moth of the family Tortricidae. It is found in Peru.

Its wingspan is 28 mm.

== Etymology ==
The species name refers to the name of the type locality, Oxapampa.
