= Orthocomotis gielisi =

Scientific classification
- Kingdom: Animalia
- Phylum: Arthropoda
- Class: Insecta
- Order: Lepidoptera
- Family: Tortricidae
- Genus: Orthocomotis
- Species: O. gielisi

Binomial name
- Orthocomotis gielisi Razowski, Pelz & Wojtusiak, 2007

Species of moth

Orthocomotis gielisi is a species of moth of the family Tortricidae. It is found in Napo Province, Ecuador.

The wingspan is 27 mm.
