= Xoser =

Scientific classification
- Kingdom: Animalia
- Phylum: Arthropoda
- Class: Insecta
- Order: Lepidoptera
- Family: Tortricidae
- Tribe: Euliini
- Genus: Xoser; Razowski & Pelz, 2003

Genus of tortrix moths

Xoser is a genus of moths belonging to the subfamily Tortricinae of the family Tortricidae.

== Species ==
- Xoser astonyx Razowski & Wojtusiak, 2010
- Xoser exors Razowski & Pelz, 2003

== See also ==
- List of Tortricidae genera
