= Orthocomotis tambitoa =

Scientific classification
- Domain: Eukaryota
- Kingdom: Animalia
- Phylum: Arthropoda
- Class: Insecta
- Order: Lepidoptera
- Family: Tortricidae
- Genus: Orthocomotis
- Species: O. tambitoa

Binomial name
- Orthocomotis tambitoa Razowski & Wojtusiak, 2011

Species of moth

Orthocomotis tambitoa is a species of moth of the family Tortricidae. It is found in the Cordillera Occidental of Colombia.

The wingspan is 23 mm.

== Etymology ==
The species name refers to the name of the type locality, Tambito.
