= Gauruncus molinopampae =

Scientific classification
- Domain: Eukaryota
- Kingdom: Animalia
- Phylum: Arthropoda
- Class: Insecta
- Order: Lepidoptera
- Family: Tortricidae
- Genus: Gauruncus
- Species: G. molinopampae

Binomial name
- Gauruncus molinopampae Razowski & Wojtusiak, 2010

Species of moth

Gauruncus molinopampae is a species of moth of the family Tortricidae. It is found in Peru.

The wingspan is 18 mm.

== Etymology ==
The species name refers to the type locality.
