= Gualaquiza Canton =

- Canton
- Flag

- Location of Morona-Santiago Province in Ecuador.

- Cantons of Morona Santiago Province
- Coordinates: 3°22′48″S 78°34′48″W
- Country: Ecuador
- Province: Morona-Santiago Province

Area
  - Total: 2,159 km^{2} (834 sq mi)

Population (2022)
  - Total: 21,892
  - Density: 10.14/km^{2} (26.26/sq mi)
- Time zone: UTC-5 (ECT)

Gualaquiza Canton is a canton of Ecuador, located in the Morona-Santiago Province. Its capital is the town of Gualaquiza. Its population at the 2001 census was 15,288.
