= Orthocomotis smaragditis =

Scientific classification
- Kingdom: Animalia
- Phylum: Arthropoda
- Class: Insecta
- Order: Lepidoptera
- Family: Tortricidae
- Genus: Orthocomotis
- Species: O. smaragditis

Binomial name
- Orthocomotis smaragditis (Meyrick, 1912)

Synonyms
- Eulia smaragditis Meyrick, 1912

Species of moth

Orthocomotis smaragditis is a species of moth of the family Tortricidae. It is found in Argentina.
