= Orthocomotis muscosana =

Scientific classification
- Kingdom: Animalia
- Phylum: Arthropoda
- Clade: Pancrustacea
- Class: Insecta
- Order: Lepidoptera
- Family: Tortricidae
- Genus: Orthocomotis
- Species: O. muscosana

Binomial name
- Orthocomotis muscosana (Zeller, 1866)

Synonyms
- Penthina muscosana Zeller, 1866

Species of moth

Orthocomotis muscosana is a species of moth of the family Tortricidae. It is found in Colombia.
