= Orthocomotis herbacea =

Scientific classification
- Domain: Eukaryota
- Kingdom: Animalia
- Phylum: Arthropoda
- Class: Insecta
- Order: Lepidoptera
- Family: Tortricidae
- Genus: Orthocomotis
- Species: O. herbacea

Binomial name
- Orthocomotis herbacea Clarke, 1956

Synonyms
- Orthocomotis subolivata Clarke, 1956

Species of moth

Orthocomotis herbacea is a species of moth of the family Tortricidae. It is found from Guatemala and Costa Rica to Ecuador (Pichincha Province, Loja Province) and Venezuela.

Larvae have been reared on Persea americana.
