= Gauruncus argillus =

Scientific classification
- Kingdom: Animalia
- Phylum: Arthropoda
- Class: Insecta
- Order: Lepidoptera
- Family: Tortricidae
- Genus: Gauruncus
- Species: G. argillus

Binomial name
- Gauruncus argillus Razowski & Pelz, 2006

Species of moth

Gauruncus argillus is a species of moth of the family Tortricidae. It is found in Loja Province, Ecuador.

The wingspan is 19.5 mm.

== Etymology ==
The species name refers to the whitish hindwings and is derived from Latin argillus (meaning potters clay).
