= Gravitcornutia altoperuviana =

Scientific classification
- Domain: Eukaryota
- Kingdom: Animalia
- Phylum: Arthropoda
- Class: Insecta
- Order: Lepidoptera
- Family: Tortricidae
- Genus: Gravitcornutia
- Species: G. altoperuviana

Binomial name
- Gravitcornutia altoperuviana Razowski & Wojtusiak, 2010

Species of moth

Gravitcornutia altoperuviana is a species of moth of the family Tortricidae. It is found in Peru.

The wingspan is 14 mm.
