= Orthocomotis =

Scientific classification
- Kingdom: Animalia
- Phylum: Arthropoda
- Clade: Pancrustacea
- Class: Insecta
- Order: Lepidoptera
- Family: Tortricidae
- Tribe: Euliini
- Genus: Orthocomotis; Dognin, 1905

Species
- See text

Synonyms
- Sociphora Busck, 1920

Genus of tortrix moths

Orthocomotis is a genus of moths belonging to the family Tortricidae.

== Taxonomy ==
Orthocomotis was initially classified as a member of the tribe Euliini. It was shifted to the tribe Polyorthini based on genital morphology; however, more recent research has shown that Orthocomotis should be moved back into the tribe Euliini.

== Species ==
- Orthocomotis aglaia Clarke, 1956
- Orthocomotis albimarmorea Razowski & Wojtusiak, 2006
- Orthocomotis albobasalis Razowski, Pelz & Wojtusiak, 2007
- Orthocomotis alshiana Razowski, Pelz & Wojtusiak, 2007
- Orthocomotis altivolans Brown, 2003
- Orthocomotis andina Razowski, Pelz & Wojtusiak, 2007
- Orthocomotis aphanisma Razowski & Becker, 1990
- Orthocomotis argodonta Clarke, 1956
- Orthocomotis attonsa Razowski, 1982
- Orthocomotis auchmera Razowski, 1982
- Orthocomotis benedeki Razowski & Wojtusiak, 2013
- Orthocomotis boscantica (Dognin, 1912)
- Orthocomotis carolina Razowski, Pelz & Wojtusiak, 2007
- Orthocomotis chaldera (Druce, 1889)
- Orthocomotis chlamyda Razowski & Wojtusiak, 2006
- Orthocomotis chloantha (Walsingham, 1914)
- Orthocomotis cosangana Razowski, Pelz & Wojtusiak, 2007
- Orthocomotis euchaldera Clarke, 1956
- Orthocomotis exolivata Clarke, 1956
- Orthocomotis expansa Razowski, 1999
- Orthocomotis ferruginea Razowski, Pelz & Wojtusiak, 2007
- Orthocomotis gielisi Razowski, Pelz & Wojtusiak, 2007
- Orthocomotis golondrina Razowski, Pelz & Wojtusiak, 2007
- Orthocomotis grandisocia Razowski, 1999
- Orthocomotis herbacea Clarke, 1956
- Orthocomotis herbaria (Busck, 1920)
- Orthocomotis independentia Razowski, 1999
- Orthocomotis lactistrigata Razowski, Pelz & Wojtusiak, 2007
- Orthocomotis leucothorax Clarke, 1956
- Orthocomotis longicilia Brown, 2003
- Orthocomotis longuncus Razowski & Pelz, 2003
- Orthocomotis magicana (Zeller, 1866)
- Orthocomotis mareda Clarke, 1956
- Orthocomotis marmorobrunnea Razowski & Wojtusiak, 2006
- Orthocomotis mediana Razowski, Pelz & Wojtusiak, 2007
- Orthocomotis melania Clarke, 1956
- Orthocomotis melanochlora (Meyrick, 1931)
- Orthocomotis miranda Razowski & Wojtusiak, 2011
- Orthocomotis muscosana (Zeller, 1866)
- Orthocomotis nitida Clarke, 1956
- Orthocomotis ochracea Clarke, 1956
- Orthocomotis ochrosaphes Clarke, 1956
- Orthocomotis olivata Dognin, 1905
- Orthocomotis oxapampae Razowski & Wojtusiak, 2010
- Orthocomotis pactoana Razowski, Pelz & Wojtusiak, 2007
- Orthocomotis parandina Razowski & Wojtusiak, 2010
- Orthocomotis parattonsa Razowski & Pelz, 2003
- Orthocomotis parexpansa Razowski, Pelz & Wojtusiak, 2007
- Orthocomotis phenax (Razowski & Becker, 1990)
- Orthocomotis prochaldera Clarke, 1956
- Orthocomotis pseudolivata Clarke, 1956
- Orthocomotis puyoana Razowski, Pelz & Wojtusiak, 2007
- Orthocomotis sachatamiae Razowski, Pelz & Wojtusiak, 2007
- Orthocomotis shuara Razowski, Pelz & Wojtusiak, 2007
- Orthocomotis similis Brown, 2003
- Orthocomotis smaragditis (Meyrick, 1912)
- Orthocomotis sucumbiana Razowski, Pelz & Wojtusiak, 2007
- Orthocomotis tambitoa Razowski & Wojtusiak, 2011
- Orthocomotis trissophricta (Meyrick, 1932)
- Orthocomotis twila Clarke, 1956
- Orthocomotis volochilesia Razowski, Pelz & Wojtusiak, 2007
- Orthocomotis yanayacu Razowski, Pelz & Wojtusiak, 2007
