= Orthocomotis golondrina =

Scientific classification
- Kingdom: Animalia
- Phylum: Arthropoda
- Class: Insecta
- Order: Lepidoptera
- Family: Tortricidae
- Genus: Orthocomotis
- Species: O. golondrina

Binomial name
- Orthocomotis golondrina Razowski, Pelz & Wojtusiak, 2007

Species of moth

Orthocomotis golondrina is a species of moth of the family Tortricidae. It is found in Carchi Province of Ecuador and in Peru.

The wingspan is 25 mm.
