= Sucúa =

- Town
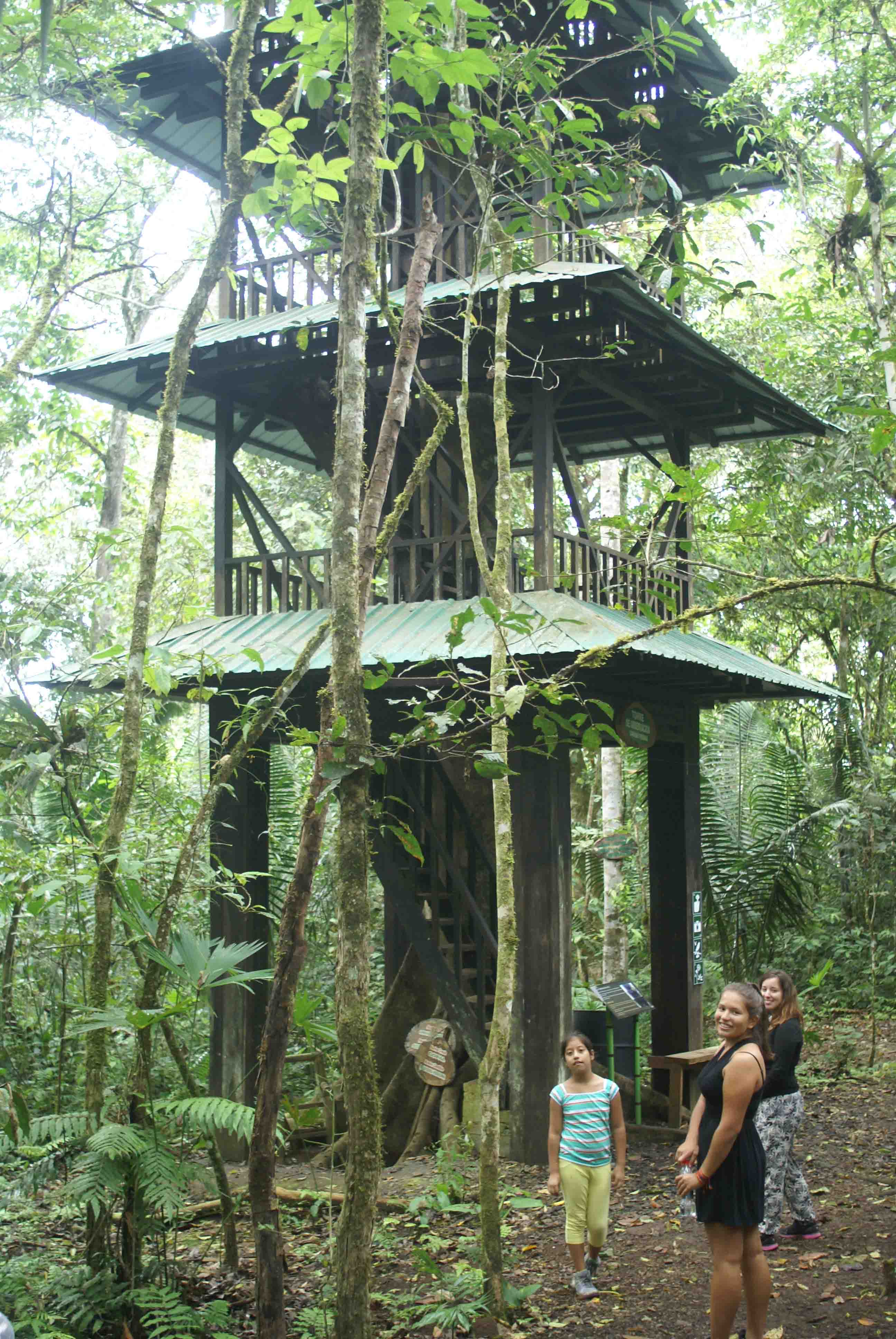
- Parque Botanico Sucua

- Location within Ecuador
- Coordinates: 02°27′36″S 78°10′12″W
- Country: Ecuador
- Province: Morona Santiago
- Canton: Sucúa Canton

Area
  - Total: 8.69 km^{2} (3.36 sq mi)
- Elevation: 900 m (3,000 ft)

Population (2022 census)
  - Total: 10,846
  - Density: 1,250/km^{2} (3,230/sq mi)
- Time zone: UTC-5
- Postal code: 140650
- Area code: +593-7
- Climate: Af
- Website: www.sucua.gob.ec

Sucúa is a town in the Morona Santiago province of Ecuador. It is the seat of the Sucúa Canton.

The population as of a 1995 census was 5,847 and in 2009 it had an estimated population of 7,919.

== Data of Sucua ==
- ALTITUDE: 900 m.s.n.m.
- TEMPERATURE: between 18 and 28 C.
- CLIMATE: The canton is subject to the influence of the Amazon, tropical humid.
- EXTENSION: 1,279.22 km2
- POPULATION: 10,846 inhabitants. (4027 women - 3778 men) 2022 census
- DATE OF CANTONIZATION: December 8, 1962
- LIMITS:
- To the North: Canton Morona,
- To the South: Cantones Logroño and Santiago,
- To the East: Canton Morona,
- To the West: Province of Cañar
- LANGUAGES: Spanish, Shuar

== Tourist attractions ==
- Río Upano
- Río tutanangoza
- Piedra del mono
- Cascadas de Arapicos
- Parque Botánico
- Petroglifos del Abuelo
- Mirador de Huambinimi
- Carnaval Culturizado
- Parque Ecuador Amazonico
- Museo de Sucua
- Tuntiak Nunkee
- Mirador de Piura
- Mirador Río Upano
- Cascadas Kintia Panki
- Cascadas del Río Umpuankas-Kumpas
- Balneario Cabañas Panki
- Las Taguas

== Tourist activities ==
- Rafting
- Sightseeing
- Camping
- Jungle exploration trips

Note: It is recommended to find an experienced tourist guide for any of these activities

== Parties and Holidays ==
- Fiesta de Cantonizacion de Sucua -December 8
- El Carnaval Culturizado (Carnival Celebration) -February
- Fiesta de Maria Auxiliadora -May 24.
- Peregrinación a la Virgen Purísima de Macas -August 4
- Fiesta de la Chonta -April/May
- Fiesta de la Yuca

== Typical food ==
- Ayampaco de pollo
- Caldo de gallina criolla
- Tamal de yuca
- Guayusa

== Climate ==
Climate data for Sucúa, elevation 910 m (2,990 ft), (1971–2000)
| Month | Jan | Feb | Mar | Apr | May | Jun | Jul | Aug | Sep | Oct | Nov | Dec | Year |
|---|---|---|---|---|---|---|---|---|---|---|---|---|---|
| Mean daily maximum °C (°F) | 27.4 (81.3) | 28.1 (82.6) | 27.1 (80.8) | 27.6 (81.7) | 27.0 (80.6) | 26.4 (79.5) | 25.5 (77.9) | 26.4 (79.5) | 26.9 (80.4) | 28.0 (82.4) | 28.8 (83.8) | 28.7 (83.7) | 27.3 (81.2) |
| Mean daily minimum °C (°F) | 17.7 (63.9) | 17.7 (63.9) | 17.6 (63.7) | 18.0 (64.4) | 17.9 (64.2) | 17.4 (63.3) | 16.9 (62.4) | 17.0 (62.6) | 17.0 (62.6) | 17.5 (63.5) | 17.8 (64.0) | 17.5 (63.5) | 17.5 (63.5) |
| Average precipitation mm (inches) | 138.0 (5.43) | 122.0 (4.80) | 181.0 (7.13) | 177.0 (6.97) | 210.0 (8.27) | 217.0 (8.54) | 202.0 (7.95) | 146.0 (5.75) | 154.0 (6.06) | 150.0 (5.91) | 119.0 (4.69) | 91.0 (3.58) | 1,907 (75.08) |
| Average relative humidity (%) | 84 | 85 | 85 | 84 | 85 | 86 | 85 | 86 | 83 | 82 | 81 | 80 | 84 |
Source: FAO
