= Orthocomotis cosangana =

Scientific classification
- Kingdom: Animalia
- Phylum: Arthropoda
- Class: Insecta
- Order: Lepidoptera
- Family: Tortricidae
- Genus: Orthocomotis
- Species: O. cosangana

Binomial name
- Orthocomotis cosangana Razowski, Pelz & Wojtusiak, 2007

Species of moth

Orthocomotis cosangana is a species of moth of the family Tortricidae. It is found in Napo Province of Ecuador and in Peru.

The wingspan is 24 mm.

== Etymology ==
The species name refers to the type locality.
