= Orthocomotis chloantha =

Scientific classification
- Domain: Eukaryota
- Kingdom: Animalia
- Phylum: Arthropoda
- Class: Insecta
- Order: Lepidoptera
- Family: Tortricidae
- Genus: Orthocomotis
- Species: O. chloantha

Binomial name
- Orthocomotis chloantha (Walsingham, 1914)

Synonyms
- Tortrix chloantha Walsingham, 1914

Species of moth

Orthocomotis chloantha is a species of moth of the family Tortricidae. It is found in Guerrero, Mexico.
