= Gauruncus tomaszi =

Scientific classification
- Domain: Eukaryota
- Kingdom: Animalia
- Phylum: Arthropoda
- Class: Insecta
- Order: Lepidoptera
- Family: Tortricidae
- Genus: Gauruncus
- Species: G. tomaszi

Binomial name
- Gauruncus tomaszi Razowski & Wojtusiak, 2013

Species of moth

Gauruncus tomaszi is a species of moth of the family Tortricidae. It is found in Venezuela.

The wingspan is 17 mm.
