= Orthocomotis trissophricta =

Scientific classification
- Kingdom: Animalia
- Phylum: Arthropoda
- Class: Insecta
- Order: Lepidoptera
- Family: Tortricidae
- Genus: Orthocomotis
- Species: O. trissophricta

Binomial name
- Orthocomotis trissophricta (Meyrick, 1932)

Synonyms
- Eulia trissophricta Meyrick, 1932

Species of moth

Orthocomotis trissophricta is a species of moth of the family Tortricidae. It is found in Santa Catarina, Brazil.
