= Orthocomotis auchmera =

Scientific classification
- Kingdom: Animalia
- Phylum: Arthropoda
- Class: Insecta
- Order: Lepidoptera
- Family: Tortricidae
- Genus: Orthocomotis
- Species: O. auchmera

Binomial name
- Orthocomotis auchmera Razowski, 1982

Species of moth

Orthocomotis auchmera is a species of moth of the family Tortricidae. It is found in Paraná, Brazil.
