= Orthocomotis independentia =

Scientific classification
- Kingdom: Animalia
- Phylum: Arthropoda
- Class: Insecta
- Order: Lepidoptera
- Family: Tortricidae
- Genus: Orthocomotis
- Species: O. independentia

Binomial name
- Orthocomotis independentia Razowski, 1999

Species of moth

Orthocomotis independentia is a species of moth of the family Tortricidae. It is found in the Dominican Republic.
