= Palora Canton =

- Canton
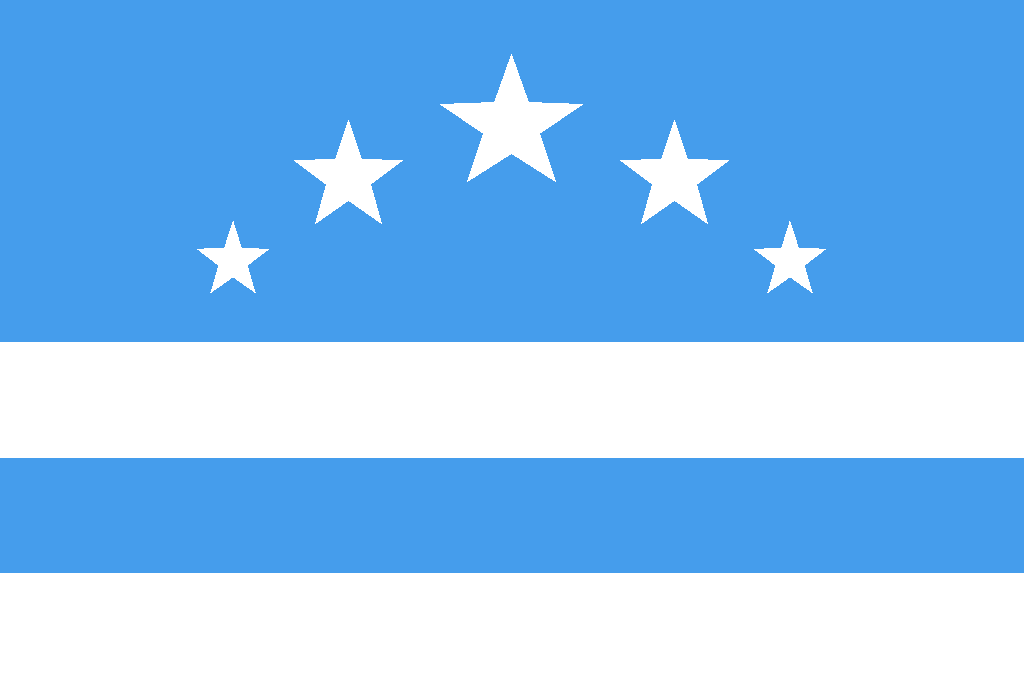
- Flag

- Location of Morona-Santiago Province in Ecuador.

- Cantons of Morona Santiago Province
- Coordinates: 1°42′0″S 77°56′24″W
- Country: Ecuador
- Province: Morona-Santiago Province

Area
  - Total: 1,449 km^{2} (559 sq mi)

Population (2022 census)
  - Total: 11,882
  - Density: 8.200/km^{2} (21.24/sq mi)
- Time zone: UTC-5 (ECT)

Palora Canton is a canton of Ecuador, located in the Morona-Santiago Province. Its capital is the town of Palora. Its population at the 2001 census was 6,317.
