= Logroño, Ecuador =

Logroño
- Town
- Location within Ecuador
- Coordinates: 2.6248°S 78.1896°W
- Country: Ecuador
- Province: Morona-Santiago Province
- Canton: Logroño

Area
  - Town: 1.98 km^{2} (0.76 sq mi)
- Elevation: 650 m (2,130 ft)

Population (2022 census)
  - Town: 1,382
  - Density: 698/km^{2} (1,810/sq mi)
- Time zone: UTC-5 (ECT)
- Area code: 07
- Climate: Af

Logroño is a town in Morona-Santiago Province, Ecuador. It is the seat of Logroño Canton. It has a population of 1,382, the majority of which are Shuar. There is a network of limestone caves 2 km from the town, "Caverna de Las Cascadas".

== History ==
Logroño has been inhabited for over 500 years by the Shuar. In 1930, the first to explore the area were missionaries who traveled down from the highlands of Ecuador (Azuay and Canar). The first evangelical missionary settlements were located south of Logrono (in Chupiankas) and the first catholic missionaries were located in the town center of Logroño. Due to its geographic location and economic assets, Logroño began its intent to become a canton on 14 October 1992, and official canton and political status were recognized on 22 January 1997.
