= Orthocomotis sachatamiae =

Scientific classification
- Kingdom: Animalia
- Phylum: Arthropoda
- Class: Insecta
- Order: Lepidoptera
- Family: Tortricidae
- Genus: Orthocomotis
- Species: O. sachatamiae

Binomial name
- Orthocomotis sachatamiae Razowski, Pelz & Wojtusiak, 2007

Species of moth

Orthocomotis sachatamiae is a species of moth of the family Tortricidae. It is found in Ecuador (Pichincha Province) and the Western Cordillera of Colombia.

The wingspan is 20.5–24 mm for males and 24.5 mm for females.

== Etymology ==
The species name refers to the type locality, Sachatamia.
