= Orthocomotis parandina =

Scientific classification
- Domain: Eukaryota
- Kingdom: Animalia
- Phylum: Arthropoda
- Class: Insecta
- Order: Lepidoptera
- Family: Tortricidae
- Genus: Orthocomotis
- Species: O. parandina

Binomial name
- Orthocomotis parandina Razowski & Wojtusiak, 2010

Species of moth

Orthocomotis parandina is a species of moth of the family Tortricidae. It is found in Napo Province, Ecuador.

The wingspan is about 25 mm (1 in).
