= Gauruncus ischyros =

Scientific classification
- Kingdom: Animalia
- Phylum: Arthropoda
- Class: Insecta
- Order: Lepidoptera
- Family: Tortricidae
- Genus: Gauruncus
- Species: G. ischyros

Binomial name
- Gauruncus ischyros Razowski & Pelz, 2013

Species of moth

Gauruncus ischyros is a species of moth of the family Tortricidae. It is found in Pichincha Province, Ecuador.

The wingspan is 16–17 mm.
