= Gravitcornutia basiceramea =

Scientific classification
- Kingdom: Animalia
- Phylum: Arthropoda
- Clade: Pancrustacea
- Class: Insecta
- Order: Lepidoptera
- Family: Tortricidae
- Genus: Gravitcornutia
- Species: G. basiceramea

Binomial name
- Gravitcornutia basiceramea Razowski & Becker, 2010

Species of moth

Gravitcornutia basiceramea is a species of moth of the family Tortricidae. It is found in Bahia, Brazil.

The wingspan is 12 mm.
