= San Juan Bosco Canton =

- Canton
- Location of Morona-Santiago Province in Ecuador.

- San Juan Bosco Canton in Morona Santiago Province
- Coordinates: 3.0923°S 78.5132°W
- Country: Ecuador
- Province: Morona-Santiago Province
- Time zone: UTC-5 (ECT)

San Juan Bosco Canton is a canton of Ecuador, located in the Morona-Santiago Province. Its capital is the town of San Juan Bosco. Its population was 4,372 at the 2022 census, which was an increase from the 2001 census that had recorded 3,131 people.
