= Gauruncus venezolanus =

Scientific classification
- Domain: Eukaryota
- Kingdom: Animalia
- Phylum: Arthropoda
- Class: Insecta
- Order: Lepidoptera
- Family: Tortricidae
- Genus: Gauruncus
- Species: G. venezolanus

Binomial name
- Gauruncus venezolanus Razowski & Brown, 2004

Species of moth

Gauruncus venezolanus is a species of moth of the family Tortricidae. It is found in Venezuela.

== Etymology ==
The species name refers to the country of Venezuela.
