= Orthocomotis attonsa =

Scientific classification
- Kingdom: Animalia
- Phylum: Arthropoda
- Class: Insecta
- Order: Lepidoptera
- Family: Tortricidae
- Genus: Orthocomotis
- Species: O. attonsa

Binomial name
- Orthocomotis attonsa Razowski, 1982

Species of moth

Orthocomotis attonsa is a species of moth of the family Tortricidae. It is found in Santa Catarina, Brazil.
