= Pablo Sexto Canton =

Coordinates: 1°48′11″S 77°55′16″W

- Canton
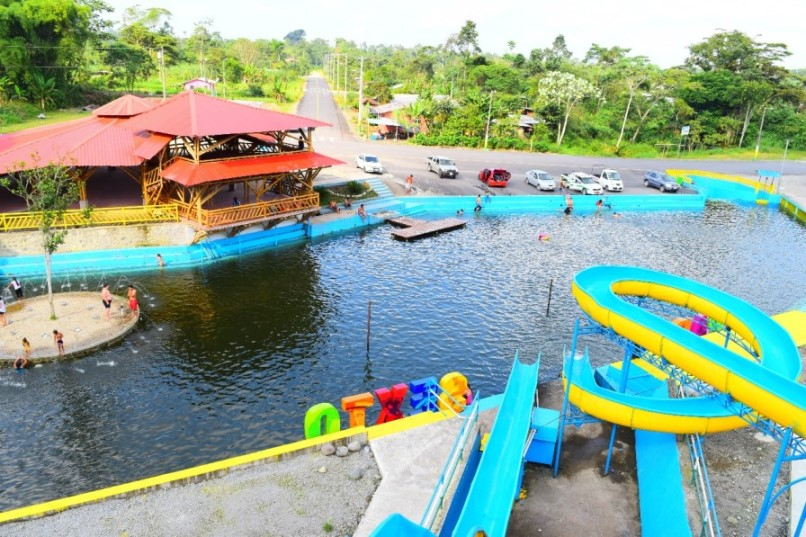

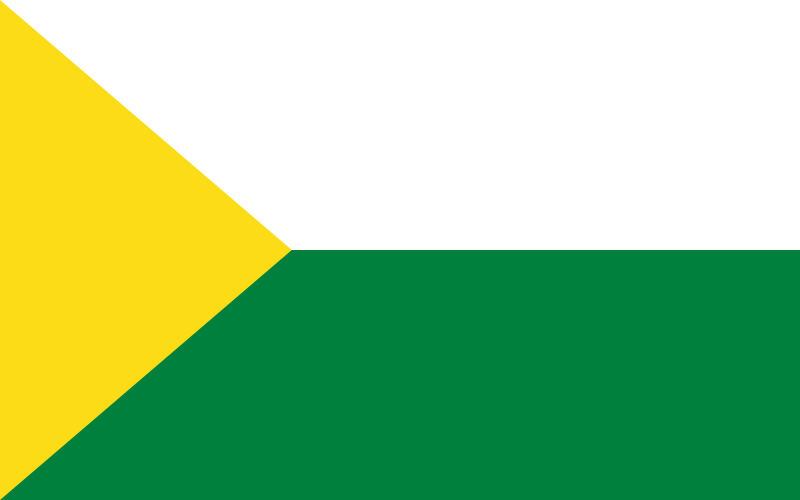
- Flag

- Location of Morona-Santiago Province in Ecuador.

- Cantons of Morona Santiago Province
- Country: Ecuador
- Province: Morona-Santiago Province
- Time zone: UTC-5 (ECT)

Pablo Sexto Canton is a canton of Ecuador, located in the Morona-Santiago Province. Its capital is the town of Pablo Sexto. Its population at the 2001 census was 1,188.
