= Gauruncus =

Scientific classification
- Kingdom: Animalia
- Phylum: Arthropoda
- Clade: Pancrustacea
- Class: Insecta
- Order: Lepidoptera
- Family: Tortricidae
- Subfamily: Tortricinae
- Tribe: Euliini
- Genus: Gauruncus; Razowski, 1988

Genus of tortrix moths

Gauruncus is a genus of moths belonging to the family Tortricidae.

== Species ==
- Gauruncus argillus Razowski & Pelz, 2006
- Gauruncus armatus Razowski & Pelz, 2006
- Gauruncus curvatus Razowski & Pelz, 2006
- Gauruncus gampsognathos Razowski, 1988
- Gauruncus gelastes Razowski, 1988
- Gauruncus gracilis Razowski & Pelz, 2006
- Gauruncus intermedius Razowski & Becker, 2002
- Gauruncus ischyros Razowski & Pelz, 2013
- Gauruncus laudatus Razowski & Pelz, 2003
- Gauruncus molinopampae Razowski & Wojtusiak, 2010
- Gauruncus rossi Razowski & Pelz, 2006
- Gauruncus simplicissimus Razowski & Pelz, 2003
- Gauruncus tomaszi Razowski & Wojtusiak, 2013
- Gauruncus venezolanus Razowski & Brown, 2004
