= Orthocomotis melanochlora =

Scientific classification
- Kingdom: Animalia
- Phylum: Arthropoda
- Class: Insecta
- Order: Lepidoptera
- Family: Tortricidae
- Genus: Orthocomotis
- Species: O. melanochlora

Binomial name
- Orthocomotis melanochlora (Meyrick, 1931)

Synonyms
- Eulia melanochlora Meyrick, 1931

Species of moth

Orthocomotis melanochlora is a species of moth of the family Tortricidae. It is found in Minas Gerais, Brazil.
