= Communicator =

Communicator may refer to:

== Computer science ==
- Acorn Communicator, a business computer developed by Acorn Computers in 1985
- Beonex Communicator, a separate branch of the Mozilla Application Suite
- Netscape Communicator, a suite of Internet applications
- Nokia Communicator, a brand name for a series of Nokia smartphones
- PDA with mobile phone functionality, also known as smartphone, such as Nokia Communicator mentioned above
- LIVECHAT Communicator, a business instant messenger software
- Microsoft Office Communicator, an instant messaging and VoIP client for Microsoft Windows

== Fiction ==
- Communicator (Star Trek), a portable communication device from the Star Trek fictional universe
- Communicator, another term for universal translator, a fictional device that allows one to understand a language from another planet or an animal

== See also ==
- Personal communicator
- The Communicator (disambiguation)
