= Limón Indanza Canton =

Limón Indanza Canton Limón
- Canton
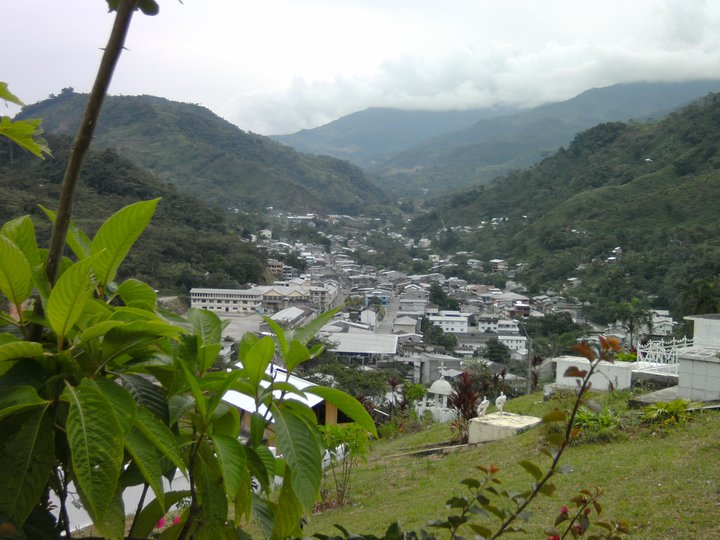
- General view of General Leonidas Plaza Gutierrez, capital of Limon Indanza.
- Nickname: Amazon Key
- Location of Morona-Santiago Province in Ecuador.

- Limón Indanza Canton in Morona Santiago Province
- Coordinates: 3°4′S 78°20′W
- Country: Ecuador
- Province: Morona-Santiago Province
- Capital: General Leonidas Plaza Gutiérrez

Government
  - Lawyer: Tarquino Cajamarca Mariles

Area
  - Total: 0.81136 sq mi (2.10142 km^{2})
- Time zone: UTC-5 (ECT)
- Area code: 07

Limón Indanza Canton is a canton of Ecuador, located in the Morona-Santiago Province. Its capital is the town of General Leonidas Plaza Gutiérrez. Its population at the 2001 census was 10,192.

It is located in the southeast of the Ecuador Republic in the Oriente.
