= The Communicator =

The Communicator may refer to:

- The Communicator (or Dakom), the official student publication of the PUP College of Communication, Manila
- "The Communicator" (Star Trek: Enterprise), the 34th episode of the television series Star Trek: Enterprise
- The Communicator, student newspaper of Indiana University-Purdue University Fort Wayne
- The Communicator, student newspaper of Spokane Falls Community College
- "The Communicator", a song by Madness from the 1999 album Wonderful
- Tiamut, a Marvel Comics character also known as "The Communicator"
