= Tiwintza Canton =

- Canton
- Location of Morona-Santiago Province in Ecuador.

- Tiwintza Canton in Morona Santiago Province
- Coordinates: 2°55′3.61″S 77°48′6.28″W
- Country: Ecuador
- Province: Morona-Santiago Province

Population (2022)
  - Total: 9,285
- Time zone: UTC-5 (ECT)

Tiwintza Canton is a canton of Ecuador, located in the Morona-Santiago Province. Its seat is located in the town of Santiago.
