= Morona Canton =

Coordinates: 2°18′S 78°07′W

- Canton
- Location of Morona-Santiago Province in Ecuador.

- Morona Canton in Morona Santiago Province
- Country: Ecuador
- Province: Morona-Santiago Province

Area
  - Total: 4,360 km^{2} (1,680 sq mi)

Population (2022 census)
  - Total: 54,935
  - Density: 12.6/km^{2} (32.6/sq mi)
- Time zone: UTC-5 (ECT)

Morona Canton is a canton of Ecuador, located in the Morona-Santiago Province. Its capital is the town of Macas. Its population at the 2001 census was 41155
