= Logroño Canton =

- Canton
- Location of Morona-Santiago Province in Ecuador.

- Logroño Canton in Morona Santiago Province
- Coordinates: 2.6248°S 78.1896°W
- Country: Ecuador
- Province: Morona-Santiago Province
- Capital: Logroño

Area
  - Total: 1,177 km^{2} (454 sq mi)

Population (2022 census)
  - Total: 7,484
  - Density: 6.359/km^{2} (16.47/sq mi)
- Time zone: UTC-5 (ECT)

Logroño Canton is a canton of Ecuador, located in the Morona-Santiago Province. Its capital is the town of Logroño. Its population at the 2001 census was 4,621. The current town of Logroño is located in the vicinity of the lost 16th century mining town of Logroño de los Caballeros.

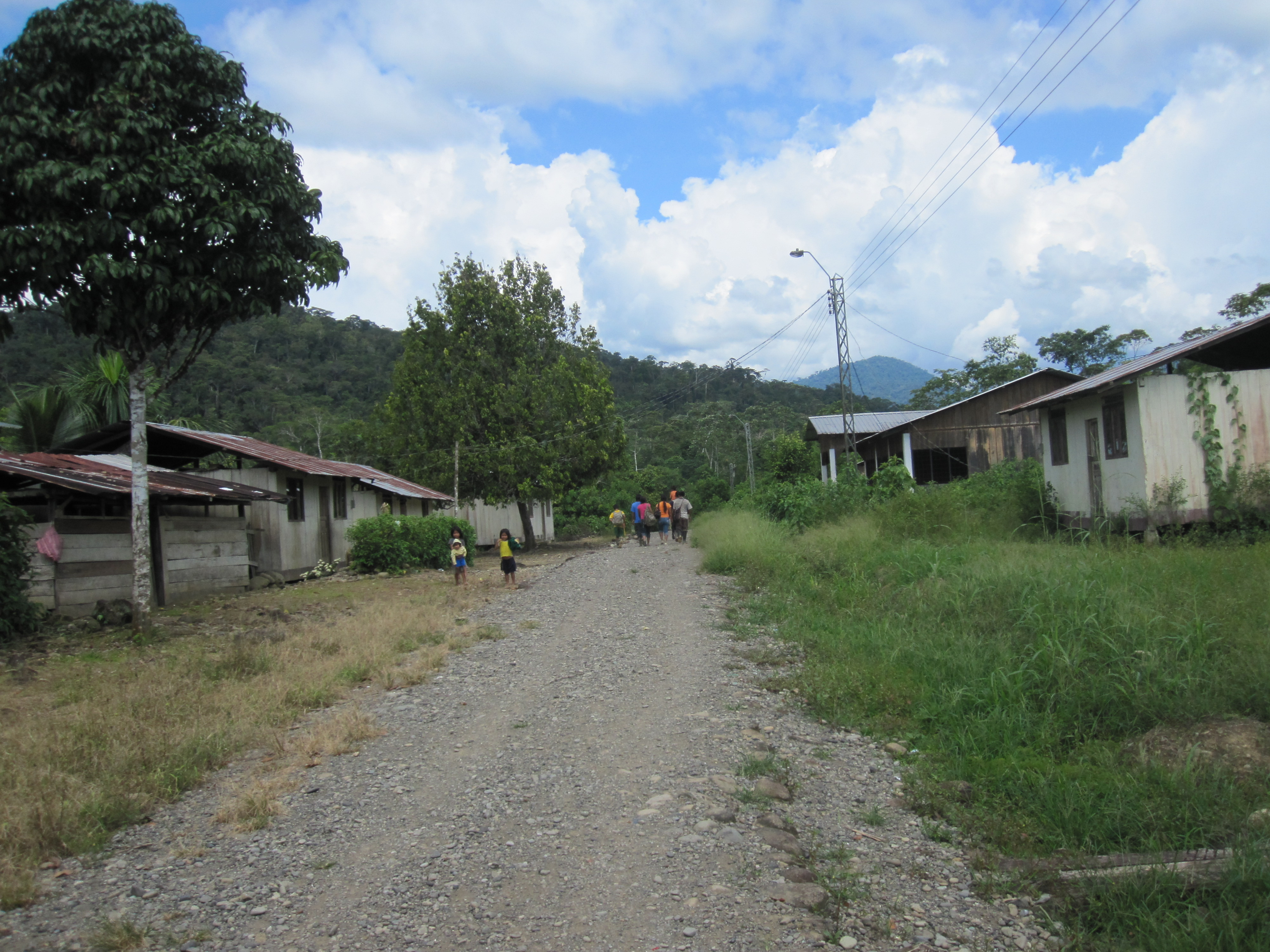
Yaupi
