= Huamboya Canton =

Coordinates: 1°47′06″S 78°13′55″W

- Canton
- Location of Morona-Santiago Province in Ecuador.

- Huamboya Canton in Morona Santiago Province
- Country: Ecuador
- Province: Morona-Santiago Province
- Time zone: UTC-5 (ECT)

Huamboya Canton is a canton of Ecuador, located in the Morona-Santiago Province. Its capital is the town of Huamboya. Its population at the 2001 census was 5,965.
