= Palora =

- Town
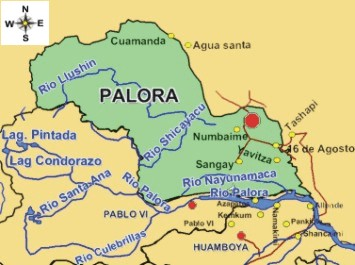
- Location of Palora in Palora Canton (large red dot)

- Location in Ecuador
- Coordinates: 1°42′0″S 77°56′24″W
- Country: Ecuador
- Province: Morona Santiago
- Canton: Palora Canton

Area
  - Town: 3.39 km^{2} (1.31 sq mi)

Population (2022 census)
  - Town: 5,748
  - Density: 1,700/km^{2} (4,390/sq mi)
  - Gender: 1,549 males and 1,603 females
- Climate: Af

Palora is a town in the Morona Santiago province of Ecuador. It is the seat of the Palora Canton.

== Climate ==
Climate data for Palora (Sayngay), elevation 970 m (3,180 ft), (1971–2000)
Month	Jan	Feb	Mar	Apr	May	Jun	Jul	Aug	Sep	Oct	Nov	Dec	Year
Average precipitation mm (inches)	283.0 (11.14)	283.0 (11.14)	346.0 (13.62)	387.0 (15.24)	309.0 (12.17)	416.0 (16.38)	352.0 (13.86)	269.0 (10.59)	338.0 (13.31)	325.0 (12.80)	325.0 (12.80)	321.0 (12.64)	3,954 (155.69)
Average relative humidity (%)	91	92	90	90	89	90	90	87	87	87	88	90	89
Source: FAO
