= Sucúa Canton =

- Canton
- Location of Morona-Santiago Province in Ecuador.

- Sucúa Canton in Morona Santiago Province
- Coordinates: 02°27′36″S 78°10′12″W
- Country: Ecuador
- Province: Morona-Santiago Province

Area
  - Total: 1,195 km^{2} (461 sq mi)

Population (2022 census)
  - Total: 23,504
  - Density: 19.67/km^{2} (50.94/sq mi)
- Time zone: UTC-5 (ECT)

Sucúa Canton is a canton of Ecuador, located in the Morona-Santiago Province. Its capital is the town of Sucúa. Its population at the 2001 census was 14,412.

== Climate ==
Climate data for Sucúa, elevation 910 m (2,990 ft), (1971–2000)
| Month | Jan | Feb | Mar | Apr | May | Jun | Jul | Aug | Sep | Oct | Nov | Dec | Year |
|---|---|---|---|---|---|---|---|---|---|---|---|---|---|
| Mean daily maximum °C (°F) | 27.4 (81.3) | 28.1 (82.6) | 27.1 (80.8) | 27.6 (81.7) | 27.0 (80.6) | 26.4 (79.5) | 25.5 (77.9) | 26.4 (79.5) | 26.9 (80.4) | 28.0 (82.4) | 28.8 (83.8) | 28.7 (83.7) | 27.3 (81.2) |
| Mean daily minimum °C (°F) | 17.7 (63.9) | 17.7 (63.9) | 17.6 (63.7) | 18.0 (64.4) | 17.9 (64.2) | 17.4 (63.3) | 16.9 (62.4) | 17.0 (62.6) | 17.0 (62.6) | 17.5 (63.5) | 17.8 (64.0) | 17.5 (63.5) | 17.5 (63.5) |
| Average precipitation mm (inches) | 138.0 (5.43) | 122.0 (4.80) | 181.0 (7.13) | 177.0 (6.97) | 210.0 (8.27) | 217.0 (8.54) | 202.0 (7.95) | 146.0 (5.75) | 154.0 (6.06) | 150.0 (5.91) | 119.0 (4.69) | 91.0 (3.58) | 1,907 (75.08) |
| Average relative humidity (%) | 84 | 85 | 85 | 84 | 85 | 86 | 85 | 86 | 83 | 82 | 81 | 80 | 84 |
Source: FAO
