= Taisha Canton =

- Canton
- Location of Morona-Santiago Province in Ecuador.

- Taisha Canton in Morona Santiago Province
- Coordinates: 2.33995°S 77.45808°W
- Country: Ecuador
- Province: Morona-Santiago Province
- Time zone: UTC-5 (ECT)

Taisha Canton is a canton of Ecuador, located in the Morona-Santiago Province. Its capital is the town of Taisha. Its population at the 2001 census was 13,078.

== Demographics ==
Ethnic groups as of the Ecuadorian census of 2010:

- Indigenous 95.9%
- Mestizo 3.8%
- White 0.3%
- Afro-Ecuadorian 0.1%
- Montubio 0.0%
- Other 0.0%

== Climate ==
Climate data for Taisha, elevation 510 m (1,670 ft), (1971–2000)
Month	Jan	Feb	Mar	Apr	May	Jun	Jul	Aug	Sep	Oct	Nov	Dec	Year
Mean daily maximum °C (°F)	28.9 (84.0)	30.6 (87.1)	29.2 (84.6)	29.2 (84.6)	29.0 (84.2)	28.2 (82.8)	27.8 (82.0)	29.1 (84.4)	30.2 (86.4)	29.9 (85.8)	30.1 (86.2)	30.2 (86.4)	29.4 (84.9)
Mean daily minimum °C (°F)	18.8 (65.8)	19.3 (66.7)	19.3 (66.7)	19.1 (66.4)	19.1 (66.4)	19.0 (66.2)	18.8 (65.8)	18.9 (66.0)	19.3 (66.7)	19.7 (67.5)	19.9 (67.8)	20.1 (68.2)	19.3 (66.7)
Average precipitation mm (inches)	224.0 (8.82)	195.0 (7.68)	275.0 (10.83)	286.0 (11.26)	217.0 (8.54)	248.0 (9.76)	273.0 (10.75)	225.0 (8.86)	207.0 (8.15)	263.0 (10.35)	263.0 (10.35)	185.0 (7.28)	2,861 (112.63)
Average relative humidity (%)	82	84	89	88	87	90	90	84	84	85	85	84	86
Source: FAO
