= Macas (city) =

- City
- Macas
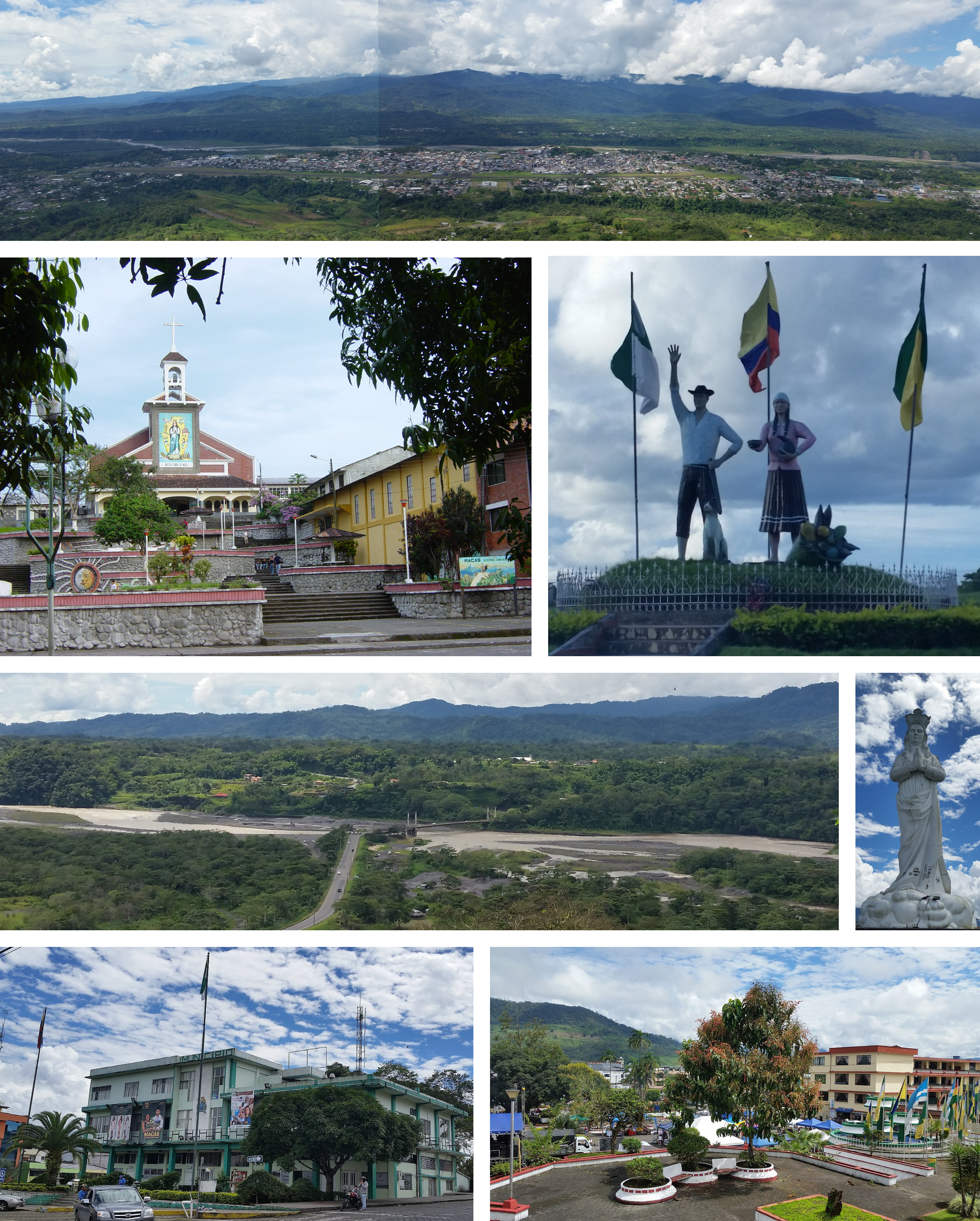
- From top, left to right: Panoramic view of the city, Cathedral of Our Lady Purest of Macas, monument to the inhabitants of Macas, Bridge of the Upano River, monument to Our Lady Purest of Macas in the viewpoint of Quílamo hill, City hall of Morona and Civic Park of Macas.

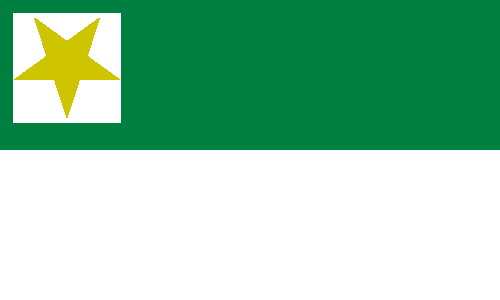
- Flag
- Nickname: Esmeralda Oriental (Emerald of the East)
- Location within Ecuador
- Coordinates: 02°22′00″S 78°08′00″W
- Country: Ecuador
- Province: Morona Santiago
- Canton: Morona Canton
- Sevilla del Oro: mid-1500s

Government
  - Type: Mayor and council
  - Governing body: Municipality of Morona
  - Mayor: Francisco Andramuño

Area
  - City: 15.73 km^{2} (6.07 sq mi)
- Elevation: 1,050 m (3,440 ft)

Population (2022 census)
  - City: 22,398
  - Density: 1,424/km^{2} (3,688/sq mi)
  - Demonym: Macabeo(-a)
- Time zone: UTC-5 (ECT)
- Climate: Af
- Website: www.morona.gob.ec (in Spanish)

Macas (Spanish pronunciation: [ˈmakas]) is the capital of Morona Santiago province in southeastern Ecuador. The city is also the seat of the county Morona. Known as the "Emerald of the East" due to its location east of the Andes mountains, Macas lies in the Upano Valley overlooking the Upano river. The city has a population of 22,398 and along with Tena and Puyo served under Spanish rule as one of Ecuador's main staging points for the colonization of the Amazon and the subjugation of its indigenous peoples. Beginning in the 1960s indigenous people have organized political federations and movements, and often locate the seats of their organizations in such cities and use them as central places for regional congresses. Macas has also been promoting tourism.

The city is an important agricultural and livestock raising center as well as a transportation hub for small jungle communities to the east. Types of agricultural products found here include yuca, sugarcane, papaya, coffee, and bananas. In recent years, Macas also developed a small tourism industry based on jungle trekking, trips to indigenous communities, and extreme sports like rafting. Macas is linked by road to Puyo in the north and Riobamba to the west.

== History ==
The name Macas comes from the Macas Indians who were thought to have inhabited a large portion of what is now the Ecuadorian section of the Amazon basin. The name 'Sevilla del Oro' was first used in 1538 when the area was first founded by Spanish captain Juan Villanueva Maldonado. It was later renamed 'Macas' and refounded in 1599. For many years, the city of Macas lay on the boundary of the province of Chimborazo. In 1929, Macas became the capital of the province of Morona Santiago.

== Culture ==
Further afield from Macas lies the territory of the Shuar and Macabea cultures, indigenous peoples that have inhabited the region for hundreds of years. Macas offers a good starting point for exploring these cultures, although this is usually best done through a guide. In the city itself, there are many handicraft makers and artisans, providing a much needed boost to the local economy.

The gastronomy of Macas relies heavily on fish and chicken. The city itself boasts many restaurants from seafood to Chinese cuisine.
