= Morona-Santiago Province =

Province of Ecuador

Morona Santiago Nampu Wentsa (Shuar)
- Province
- Province of Morona Santiago; Provincia de Morona Santiago (Spanish)
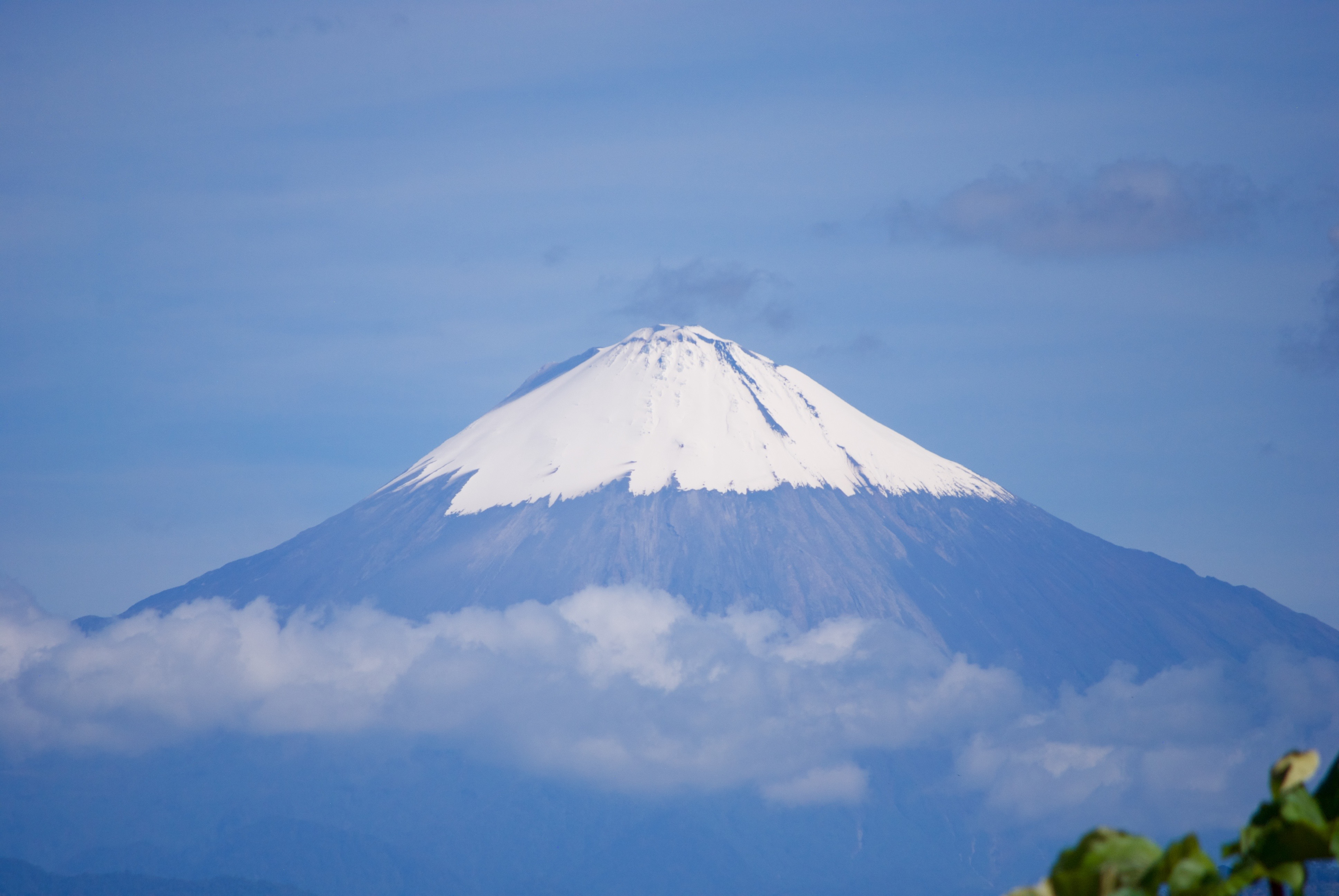
- Photo of Volcan Sangay

- Flag

- Location of Morona-Santiago Province in Ecuador.

- Cantons of Morona Santiago Province
- Coordinates: 02°22′00″S 78°08′00″W
- Country: Ecuador
- Established: February 24, 1954
- Capital: Macas
- Cantons: List of Cantons

Government
  - Prefect: Tiyua Uyunkar (MUPP)
  - Vice Prefect: Daniela Vintimilla
  - Governor: Willam Gómez

Area
  - Total: 25,690 km^{2} (9,920 sq mi)

Population (2022 census)
  - Total: 192,508
  - Density: 7.493/km^{2} (19.41/sq mi)
- Time zone: UTC-5 (ECT)
- Vehicle registration: V
- HDI (2022): 0.700 medium · 24th
- Website: www.moronasantiago.gob.ec

Morona Santiago (Spanish pronunciation: [moˈɾona sanˈtjaɣo]) is a province in Ecuador. The province was established on February 24, 1954. The capital is Macas.

== Economy ==
The provincial economy is industrially unexploited to its potential due to poor means of transportation. Its economy relies largely on the tourist sector of the rain forest. The Sangay National Park and the indigenous town of Shuara are some of its main attractions.

== Demographics ==
Ethnic groups as of the Ecuadorian census of 2010:

- Indigenous 48.4%
- Mestizo 46.6%
- White 3.1%
- Afro-Ecuadorian 1.2%
- Montubio 0.2%
- Other 0.5%

== Cantons ==
As of 2025, the province is divided into 13 cantons. The most recently created cantons are Sevilla Don Bosco in 2024, and Tiwintza in 2002. The following table lists the cantons with the name of the canton seat or capital. For the cantons that existed at the time of the 2001 national census, the area in square kilometres (km^{2}) and the 2001 population is provided.

Canton	Pop. (2001)	Area (km^{2})	Seat/Capital
Gualaquiza	15,288	2,203	Gualaquiza
Huamboya	5,965	653	Huamboya
Limón Indanza	10,192	2,101	General Leonidas Plaza Gutiérrez
Logroño	4,621	1,218	Logroño
Morona	31,379	5,095	Macas
Pablo Sexto	1,188	1,371	Pablo Sexto
Palora	6,317	1,436	Palora
San Juan Bosco	3,131	1,047	San Juan Bosco
Santiago de Méndez	9,841	1,691	Santiago de Méndez (Santiago)
Sevilla Don Bosco			Sevilla Don Bosco
Sucúa	14,412	893	Sucúa
Taisha	13,078	6,090	Taisha
Tiwintza			Santiago

== Notable people ==
Luzmila Abad was born here and is one of its representatives (in 2023) at Ecuador's National Assembly.

== See also ==
- Provinces of Ecuador
- Cantons of Ecuador

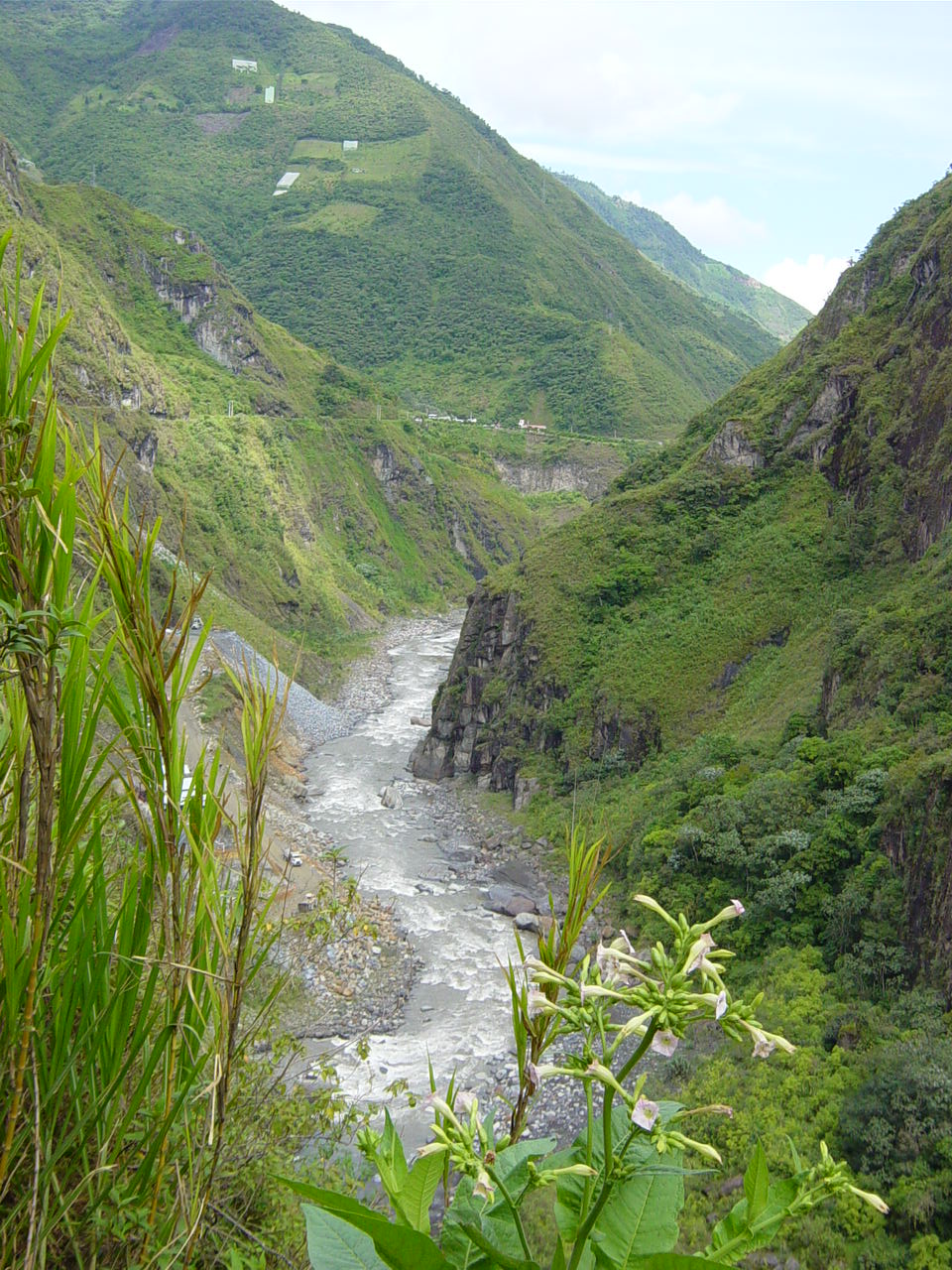
Pastazas river near Baños
