= Lasiothyris =

Scientific classification
- Kingdom: Animalia
- Phylum: Arthropoda
- Clade: Pancrustacea
- Class: Insecta
- Order: Lepidoptera
- Family: Tortricidae
- Tribe: Cochylini
- Genus: Lasiothyris; Meyrick, 1917

Synonyms
- Lasithyris Obraztsov, 1967

Genus of tortrix moths

Lasiothyris is a genus of moths belonging to the family Tortricidae.

== Species ==
- Lasiothyris astricta (Razowski & Becker, 1983)
- Lasiothyris cerastes Razowski & Becker, 1986
- Lasiothyris cnestovalva Razowski & Becker, 1986
- Lasiothyris competitrix (Razowski & Becker, 1983)
- Lasiothyris diclada Razowski & Becker, 1986
- Lasiothyris exocha Razowski & Becker, 2007
- Lasiothyris ficta (Razowski & Becker, 1983)
- Lasiothyris gravida Razowski, 1986
- Lasiothyris guanana Razowski & Becker, 2007
- Lasiothyris heterophaea (Clarke, 1968)
- Lasiothyris ichthyochroa (Walsingham, 1897)
- Lasiothyris ilingocornuta Razowski & Becker, 1993
- Lasiothyris limatula Meyrick, 1917
- Lasiothyris luminosa (Razowski & Becker, 1983)
- Lasiothyris megapenis Razowski & Becker, 1993
- Lasiothyris micida Razowski & Becker, 1986
- Lasiothyris omissa Razowski & Becker, 1993
- Lasiothyris perlochra Razowski & Becker, 2002
- Lasiothyris pervicax Razowski & Becker, 1993
- Lasiothyris puertoricana Razowski & Becker, 2007
- Lasiothyris revulsa Razowski & Becker, 1993
- Lasiothyris sorbia Razowski & Becker, 1993
- Lasiothyris subdiclada Razowski & Becker, 2002
- Lasiothyris subsorbia Razowski & Becker, 2007
- Lasiothyris taima Razowski & Becker, 2002
- Lasiothyris tardans Razowski & Becker, 1993

== Former species ==
- Lasiothyris docilis Razowski & Becker, 2002
- Lasiothyris perjura Razowski & Becker, 1993

== See also ==
- List of Tortricidae genera
