= Lasiothyris diclada =

Scientific classification
- Kingdom: Animalia
- Phylum: Arthropoda
- Clade: Pancrustacea
- Class: Insecta
- Order: Lepidoptera
- Family: Tortricidae
- Genus: Lasiothyris
- Species: L. diclada

Binomial name
- Lasiothyris diclada Razowski & Becker, 1986

Species of moth

Lasiothyris diclada is a species of moth of the family Tortricidae. It is found in Brazil (Minas Gerais, Paraná) and Costa Rica.
