= Lasiothyris exocha =

Scientific classification
- Kingdom: Animalia
- Phylum: Arthropoda
- Clade: Pancrustacea
- Class: Insecta
- Order: Lepidoptera
- Family: Tortricidae
- Genus: Lasiothyris
- Species: L. exocha

Binomial name
- Lasiothyris exocha Razowski & Becker, 2007

Species of moth

Lasiothyris exocha is a species of moth of the family Tortricidae. It is found in Carchi Province, Ecuador.

The wingspan is about 24.5 mm.

== Etymology ==
The species name refers to the character of the species and is derived from Greek exochos (meaning exquisite).
