= Lasiothyris limatula =

Scientific classification
- Kingdom: Animalia
- Phylum: Arthropoda
- Class: Insecta
- Order: Lepidoptera
- Family: Tortricidae
- Genus: Lasiothyris
- Species: L. limatula

Binomial name
- Lasiothyris limatula Meyrick, 1917

Species of moth

Lasiothyris limatula is a species of moth of the family Tortricidae. It is found in Chimborazo Province, Ecuador.
