= Lasiothyris gravida =

Scientific classification
- Kingdom: Animalia
- Phylum: Arthropoda
- Class: Insecta
- Order: Lepidoptera
- Family: Tortricidae
- Genus: Lasiothyris
- Species: L. gravida

Binomial name
- Lasiothyris gravida Razowski, 1986

Species of moth

Lasiothyris gravida is a species of moth of the family Tortricidae. It is found in Veracruz, Mexico.
