= Lasiothyris astricta =

Scientific classification
- Kingdom: Animalia
- Phylum: Arthropoda
- Clade: Pancrustacea
- Class: Insecta
- Order: Lepidoptera
- Family: Tortricidae
- Genus: Lasiothyris
- Species: L. astricta

Binomial name
- Lasiothyris astricta (Razowski & Becker, 1983)

Synonyms
- Saphenista astricta Razowski & Becker, 1983

Species of moth

Lasiothyris astricta is a species of moth of the family Tortricidae. It is found in Brazil in the states of Minas Gerais, Paraná and Santa Catarina.
