= Lasiothyris micida =

Scientific classification
- Kingdom: Animalia
- Phylum: Arthropoda
- Clade: Pancrustacea
- Class: Insecta
- Order: Lepidoptera
- Family: Tortricidae
- Genus: Lasiothyris
- Species: L. micida

Binomial name
- Lasiothyris micida Razowski & Becker, 1986

Species of moth

Lasiothyris micida is a species of moth of the family Tortricidae. It is found in Costa Rica.
