= Lasiothyris subsorbia =

Scientific classification
- Kingdom: Animalia
- Phylum: Arthropoda
- Clade: Pancrustacea
- Class: Insecta
- Order: Lepidoptera
- Family: Tortricidae
- Genus: Lasiothyris
- Species: L. subsorbia

Binomial name
- Lasiothyris subsorbia Razowski & Becker, 2007

Species of moth

Lasiothyris subsorbia is a species of moth of the family Tortricidae. It is found in Cuba.

The wingspan is about 10 mm.
