= Lasiothyris heterophaea =

Scientific classification
- Domain: Eukaryota
- Kingdom: Animalia
- Phylum: Arthropoda
- Class: Insecta
- Order: Lepidoptera
- Family: Tortricidae
- Genus: Lasiothyris
- Species: L. heterophaea

Binomial name
- Lasiothyris heterophaea (Clarke, 1968)

Synonyms
- Phalonidia heterophaea Clarke, 1968

Species of moth

Lasiothyris heterophaea is a species of moth of the family Tortricidae. It is found in Colombia.
