= Lasiothyris ichthyochroa =

Scientific classification
- Domain: Eukaryota
- Kingdom: Animalia
- Phylum: Arthropoda
- Class: Insecta
- Order: Lepidoptera
- Family: Tortricidae
- Genus: Lasiothyris
- Species: L. ichthyochroa

Binomial name
- Lasiothyris ichthyochroa (Walsingham, 1897)

Synonyms
- Phalonia ichthyochroa Walsingham, 1897

Species of moth

Lasiothyris ichthyochroa is a species of moth of the family Tortricidae. It is found on the Virgin Islands, including Saint Croix.
