= Lasiothyris taima =

Scientific classification
- Kingdom: Animalia
- Phylum: Arthropoda
- Clade: Pancrustacea
- Class: Insecta
- Order: Lepidoptera
- Family: Tortricidae
- Genus: Lasiothyris
- Species: L. taima

Binomial name
- Lasiothyris taima Razowski & Becker, 2002

Species of moth

Lasiothyris taima is a species of moth of the family Tortricidae. It is found in Rio Grande do Sul, Brazil.

The wingspan is about 9 mm.
