= Lasiothyris puertoricana =

Scientific classification
- Kingdom: Animalia
- Phylum: Arthropoda
- Clade: Pancrustacea
- Class: Insecta
- Order: Lepidoptera
- Family: Tortricidae
- Genus: Lasiothyris
- Species: L. puertoricana

Binomial name
- Lasiothyris puertoricana Razowski & Becker, 2007

Species of moth

Lasiothyris puertoricana is a species of moth of the family Tortricidae. It is found in Puerto Rico.

The wingspan is about 9 mm.

== Etymology ==
The species name refers to the country of origin.
