= Mielkeana =

Scientific classification
- Kingdom: Animalia
- Phylum: Arthropoda
- Clade: Pancrustacea
- Class: Insecta
- Order: Lepidoptera
- Family: Tortricidae
- Tribe: Cochylini
- Genus: Mielkeana; Razowski & Becker, 1983

Genus of tortrix moths

Mielkeana is a genus of moths belonging to the family Tortricidae.

== Species ==
- Mielkeana angysocia Razowski & Becker, 1986
- Mielkeana gelasima Razowski & Becker, 1983
- Mielkeana perbella Razowski, 1993
- Mielkeana perjura (Razowski & Becker, 1993)

== See also ==
- List of Tortricidae genera
