= Lasiothyris perlochra =

Scientific classification
- Kingdom: Animalia
- Phylum: Arthropoda
- Clade: Pancrustacea
- Class: Insecta
- Order: Lepidoptera
- Family: Tortricidae
- Genus: Lasiothyris
- Species: L. perlochra

Binomial name
- Lasiothyris perlochra Razowski & Becker, 2002

Species of moth

Lasiothyris perlochra is a species of moth of the family Tortricidae. It is found in Minas Gerais, Brazil.

The wingspan is about 10.5 mm.
