= Lasiothyris guanana =

Scientific classification
- Kingdom: Animalia
- Phylum: Arthropoda
- Clade: Pancrustacea
- Class: Insecta
- Order: Lepidoptera
- Family: Tortricidae
- Genus: Lasiothyris
- Species: L. guanana

Binomial name
- Lasiothyris guanana Razowski & Becker, 2007

Synonyms
- Lasiothyris gounana

Species of moth

Lasiothyris guanana is a species of moth of the family Tortricidae. It is found on the British Virgin Islands.

The wingspan is about 7 mm.
