= Mielkeana gelasima =

Scientific classification
- Kingdom: Animalia
- Phylum: Arthropoda
- Clade: Pancrustacea
- Class: Insecta
- Order: Lepidoptera
- Family: Tortricidae
- Genus: Mielkeana
- Species: M. gelasima

Binomial name
- Mielkeana gelasima Razowski & Becker, 1983

Species of moth

Mielkeana gelasima is a species of moth of the family Tortricidae. It is found in Paraná, Brazil.
