= Lasiothyris tardans =

Scientific classification
- Kingdom: Animalia
- Phylum: Arthropoda
- Clade: Pancrustacea
- Class: Insecta
- Order: Lepidoptera
- Family: Tortricidae
- Genus: Lasiothyris
- Species: L. tardans

Binomial name
- Lasiothyris tardans Razowski & Becker, 1993

Species of moth

Lasiothyris tardans is a species of moth of the family Tortricidae. It is found in Minas Gerais, Brazil.
