= Mielkeana perbella =

Scientific classification
- Kingdom: Animalia
- Phylum: Arthropoda
- Class: Insecta
- Order: Lepidoptera
- Family: Tortricidae
- Genus: Mielkeana
- Species: M. perbella

Binomial name
- Mielkeana perbella Razowski, 1993

Species of moth

Mielkeana perbella is a species of moth of the family Tortricidae. It is found in Durango, Mexico.
