= Lasiothyris ficta =

Scientific classification
- Kingdom: Animalia
- Phylum: Arthropoda
- Clade: Pancrustacea
- Class: Insecta
- Order: Lepidoptera
- Family: Tortricidae
- Genus: Lasiothyris
- Species: L. ficta

Binomial name
- Lasiothyris ficta (Razowski & Becker, 1983)

Synonyms
- Saphenista ficta Razowski & Becker, 1983

Species of moth

Lasiothyris ficta is a species of moth of the family Tortricidae. It is found in Brazil (Mato Grosso, Paraná, Santa Catarina) and Costa Rica.

== Subspecies ==
- Lasiothyris ficta ficta (Brazil)
- Lasiothyris ficta chydora Razowski, 1999 (Costa Rica)
