= Lasiothyris competitrix =

Scientific classification
- Kingdom: Animalia
- Phylum: Arthropoda
- Clade: Pancrustacea
- Class: Insecta
- Order: Lepidoptera
- Family: Tortricidae
- Genus: Lasiothyris
- Species: L. competitrix

Binomial name
- Lasiothyris competitrix (Razowski & Becker, 1983)

Synonyms
- Mielkeana competitrix Razowski & Becker, 1983; Mielkeana contemptrix Razowski & Becker, 1994

Species of moth

Lasiothyris competitrix is a species of moth of the family Tortricidae. It is found in Santa Catarina, Brazil.
