= Mielkeana perjura =

Scientific classification
- Kingdom: Animalia
- Phylum: Arthropoda
- Clade: Pancrustacea
- Class: Insecta
- Order: Lepidoptera
- Family: Tortricidae
- Genus: Mielkeana
- Species: M. perjura

Binomial name
- Mielkeana perjura (Razowski & Becker, 1993)

Synonyms
- Lasiothyris perjura Razowski & Becker, 1993

Species of moth

Mielkeana perjura is a species of moth of the family Tortricidae. It is found in Santa Catarina, Brazil.
