= Bernard Landry (entomologist) =

- Born: 1962 (age 63–64); Quebec, Canada
- Education: University of Montreal; McGill University; Carleton University
- Known for: Systematics and taxonomy of Pyraloidea, especially Crambinae
- Scientific career
- Fields: Entomology, lepidopterology
- Workplaces: Muséum d'histoire naturelle de Genève

Bernard Landry (born 1962) is a Canadian entomologist and lepidopterist specializing in Pyraloidea, particularly the Crambinae. He graduated from the University of Montreal, completed his master's degree at McGill University in 1987, working on the pterophorids of the subfamily Platyptiliinae, and received his PhD from Carleton University in 1992.

From 2001 to 2025, he was a research scientist at the Muséum d'histoire naturelle de Genève, where he is now an honorary curator. His research has included the evolution and taxonomy of Crambinae in the Americas and inventories and descriptions of Lepidoptera from the Galápagos Islands. He has served or serves on the editorial boards of Nota Lepidopterologica, ZooKeys, Alpine Entomology, and the Revue suisse de zoologie.

== Taxa dedicated to Bernard Landry ==
Bernard Landry is the namesake of the following species:

- Adaina bernardi Gielis, 1992
- Afroromieuxia bernardlandryi Bassi, 2021
- Amblyptilia landryi Gielis, 2006
- Cameraria landryi De Prins, 2012
- Celaenorrhinus landryi Libert, 2014
- Chrysoteuchia landryi Jie, Yang & Li, 2019
- Eupithecia landryi Vargas, 2011
- Lepidozonates landryi Park, 2017
- Microchilo landryi Li, 2018
- Netechmodes landryi Razowski, 2004
- Praepedaliodes landryi Pyrcz & Freitas, 2017
- Rhiza bernardi L. Ronkay & G. Ronkay, 2023
- Tricheurois landryi Varga, Ronkay, Gyulai, Kiss & Ronkay, 2020

== Taxa described ==
Bernard Landry is the author or co-author of three tribes:

- Euchromiusini Léger, Landry & Nuss, 2019
- Haimbachiini Landry, 1995
- Prionapterygini Landry, 1995

Fifteen genera:

- Almita Landry, 1995
- Aulombardia L. Ronkay, G. Ronkay & Landry, 2023
- Blascocostaligia L. Ronkay, G. Ronkay & Landry, 2023
- Cheverella Landry, 2011
- Chileoptilia Vargas & Landry, 2005
- Coloradactria Landry & Léger, 2025
- Galagete Landry, 2002
- Grenonia L. Ronkay, G. Ronkay & Landry, 2023
- Lorrainlandryia L. Ronkay, G. Ronkay & Landry, 2023
- Neodactria Landry, 1995
- Nevadapteryx Landry, 2025
- Shafferiessa Landry & Neunzig, 1998
- Transeuplexia L. Ronkay, G. Ronkay & Landry, 2020
- Vernieria L. Ronkay, G. Ronkay & Landry, 2023
- Xavierperretia L. Ronkay, G. Ronkay & Landry, 2023

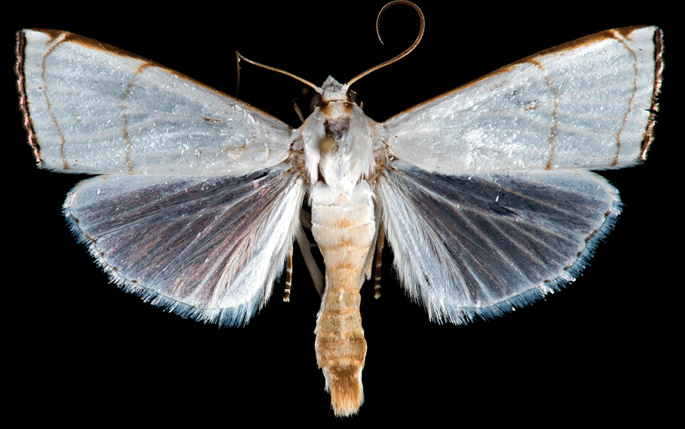
Holotype of Catharylla chelicerata Léger & Landry, 2014.

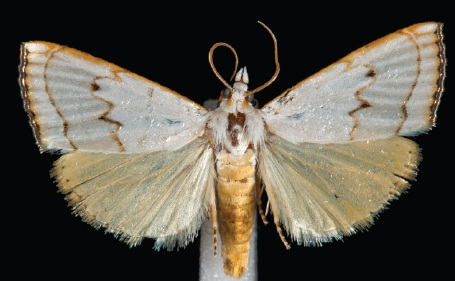
Holotype of Catharylla serrabonita Léger & Landry, 2014.

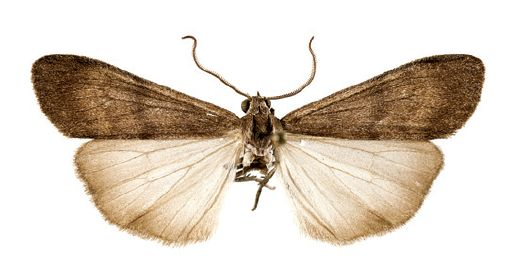
Holotype of Utetheisa henrii Landry & Roque-Albelo, 2009.

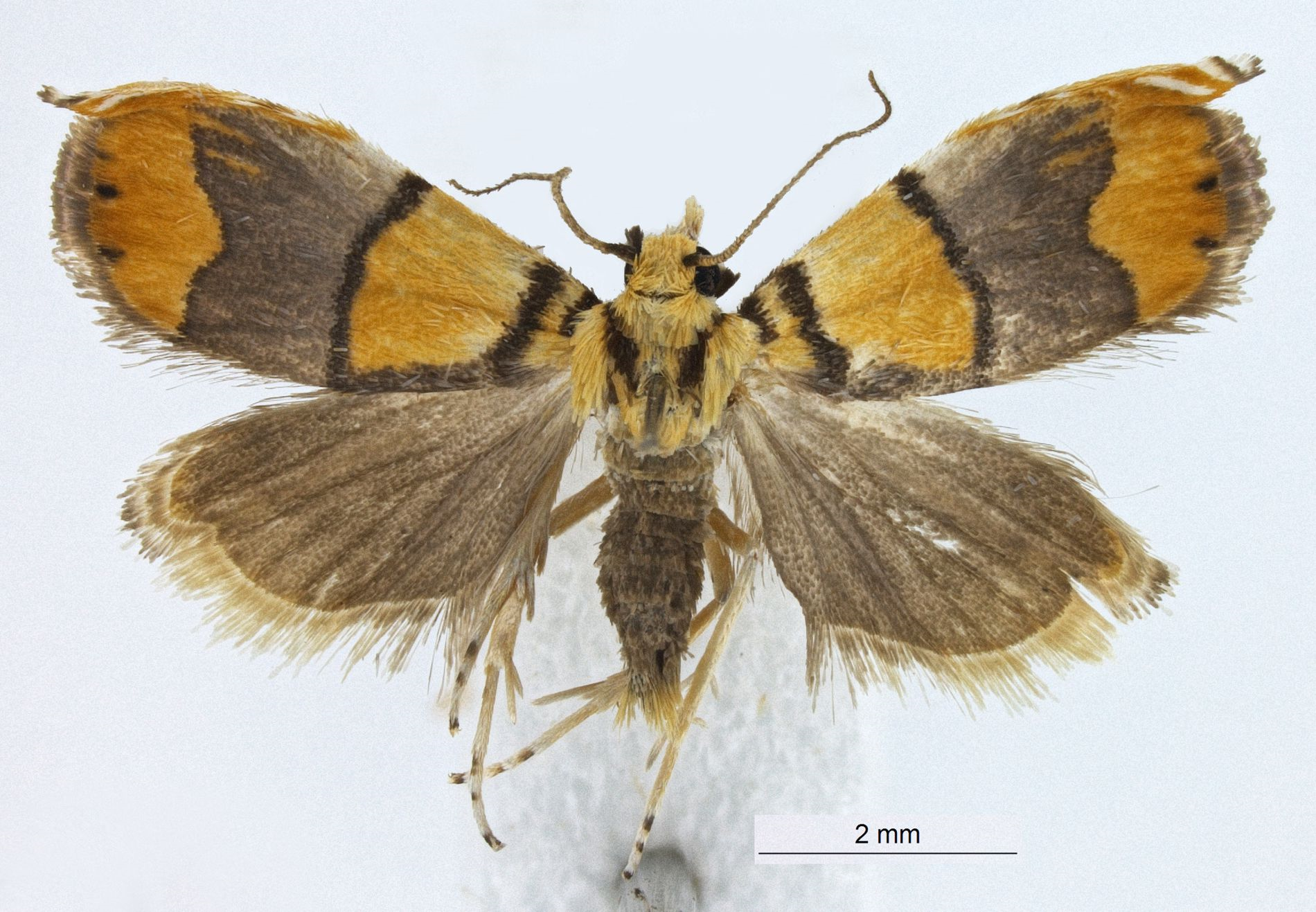
Holotype of Diptychophora galvani Landry & Becker, 2021.

And the following species or subspecies:

- Acrocercops serrigera galapagosensis Landry, 2006
- Adaina scalesiae Landry, Roque-Albelo & Matthews, 2004
- Agathodes galapagensis Landry, 2016
- Almita portalia Landry, 1995
- Almita texana Landry, 1995
- Alucita adriendenisi Landry & Landry, 2004
- Alucita lalannei Landry & Landry, 2004
- Antha descombesi L. Ronkay, G. Ronkay & Landry, 2023
- Apamea andrepougeti L. Ronkay, G. Ronkay & Landry, 2023
- Apamea aquila heizmanni L. Ronkay, G. Ronkay & Landry, 2023
- Apamea bernhardmayi L. Ronkay, G. Ronkay, Landry & Zilli, 2022
- Apamea ericmetzleri L. Ronkay, G. Ronkay, Landry & Zilli, 2022
- Apamea norbertkeili L. Ronkay, G. Ronkay, Landry & Zilli, 2022
- Apamea oblonga michelabilalliae L. Ronkay, G. Ronkay & Landry, 2023
- Apamea ploessli L. Ronkay, G. Ronkay, Landry & Zilli, 2022
- Apamea stangelmaieri L. Ronkay, G. Ronkay, Landry & Zilli, 2022
- Astrotischeria alcedoensis Landry, 2004
- Astrotischeria scalesiaella Landry, 2004
- Athetis andreluethii L. Ronkay, G. Ronkay & Landry, 2023
- Athetis baptisteguyei L. Ronkay, G. Ronkay & Landry, 2023
- Athetis hiltbrandi L. Ronkay, G. Ronkay & Landry, 2023
- Athetis jacquelinestuderae L. Ronkay, G. Ronkay & Landry, 2023
- Athetis naciriae L. Ronkay, G. Ronkay & Landry, 2023
- Bucculatrix caribbea Davis & Landry, 2002
- Bucculatrix cordiaella Davis & Landry, 2002
- Callyna bijlengai L. Ronkay, G. Ronkay & Landry, 2023
- Callyna danielneroni L. Ronkay, G. Ronkay & Landry, 2023
- Callyna theolegeri L. Ronkay, G. Ronkay & Landry, 2023
- Caloptilia cruzorum Landry, 2006
- Caloptilia dondavisi Landry, 2006
- Caloptilia galacotra Landry, 2006
- Calosima darwini Adamski & Landry, 1997
- Catharylla bijuga Léger & Landry, 2014
- Catharylla chelicerata Léger & Landry, 2014
- Catharylla coronata Léger & Landry, 2014
- Catharylla gigantea Léger & Landry, 2014
- Catharylla mayrabonillae Léger & Landry, 2014
- Catharylla serrabonita Léger & Landry, 2014
- Caudellia galapagosensis Landry & Neunzig, 2006
- Cheverella galapagensis Landry, 2011
- Chileoptilia yaroella Vargas & Landry, 2005
- Chionodes manabiensis Schmitz & Landry, 2007
- Chionodes stefaniae Schmitz & Landry, 2007
- Cirrhia jacquesplantei L. Ronkay, G. Ronkay & Landry, 2023
- Coelostathma caerulea Landry, 2001
- Coelostathma cocoana Landry, 2001
- Coelostathma continua Landry, 2001
- Coelostathma pygmaea Landry, 2001
- Coelostathma xocoatlana Landry, 2001
- Coloradactria frigida Warren, Ferris & Landry, 2025
- Coniostola isabelae Razowski & Landry, 2008
- Cosmopterix galapagosensis Landry, 2001
- Cosmopterix madeleinae Landry, 2001
- Cosmopterix yvani Landry, 2001
- Cryptolectica lazaroi Landry, 2006
- Desmia mordor Landry & Solis, 2016
- Dialectica galapagosensis Landry, 2006
- Dialectica sanctaecrucis darwini Landry, 2006
- Diaphania galapagensis Landry & Solis, 2016
- Dichrorampha galapagana Razowski & Landry, 2008
- Diptychophora ardalia Landry & Becker, 2021
- Diptychophora galvani Landry & Becker, 2021
- Diptychophora huixtla Landry, 1990
- Diptychophora planaltina Landry & Becker, 2021
- Diptychophora powelli Landry, 1990
- Eccopsis floreana Razowski & Landry, 2008
- Eccopsis galapagana Razowski & Landry, 2008
- Ephysteris scimitarella Landry, 2010
- Ephysteris sporobolella Landry, 2010
- Epinotia microscyphos Razowski & Landry, 2008
- Episimus alcedanus Razowski & Landry, 2008
- Erdemsevenia marcaudardi L. Ronkay, G. Ronkay & Landry, 2023
- Eupithecia galapagosata Landry & Rindge, 1995
- Exelastis dowi Matthews & Landry, 2008
- Fissicrambus jourdani Landry & Lopez-Vaamonde, 2026
- Galagete cinerea Landry, 2002
- Galagete consimilis Landry, 2002
- Galagete cristobalensis Landry, 2002
- Galagete darwini Landry, 2002
- Galagete espanolaensis Landry, 2002
- Galagete griseonana Schmitz & Landry, 2005
- Galagete krameri Landry & Schmitz, 2008
- Galagete levequei Landry, 2002
- Galagete pecki Landry, 2002
  - Galagete pecki flavofasciata Schmitz & Landry, 2005
  - Galagete pecki pecki Landry, 2002
- Galagete seymourensis Landry, 2002
- Galagete turritella Landry, 2002
- Geina sheppardi Landry, 1989
- Grenonia papplaci L. Ronkay, G. Ronkay & Landry, 2023
- Haplochrois galapagosalis Landry, 2001
- Hedya brunneograpta Razowski & Landry, 2008
- Heliodines galapagoensis Heppner & Landry, 1994
- Hellinsia danielae Landry & Gielis, 2022
- Hellula galapagensis Landry, 2008
- Hemerodromia fibrina Landry & Harper, 1985
- Holcocera gozmanyi Adamski & Landry, 2007
- Hoplodrina piffarettii L. Ronkay, G. Ronkay & Landry, 2023
- Hypocalamia meterythra yvonneberneyae L. Ronkay, G. Ronkay & Landry, 2023
- Ithome volcanica Landry, 2001
- La cerveza Landry, 1995
- La florenciae Landry & Léger, 2024
- La galapagensis Landry & Léger, 2024
- La grisea Landry & Léger, 2024
- La paquitae Landry & Léger, 2024
- La wagneuri Landry & Léger, 2024
- Leucochlaena caillezi L. Ronkay, G. Ronkay & Landry, 2023
- Lineodes corinnae Landry, 2016
- Lineodes vulcanalis Landry, 2016
- Litoligia benierae L. Ronkay, G. Ronkay & Landry, 2023
- Macrorrhinia pinta Landry & Neunzig, 1998
- Megalota johni Razowski & Landry, 2008
- Mesolia christinae Landry & Léger, 2024
- Metopoceras omar comitinoguexae L. Ronkay, G. Ronkay & Landry, 2023
- Micrelephas chalybeus Landry, 2003
- Micrelephas gaskini Landry, 2003
- Micrelephas helenae Landry, 2003
- Micrelephas longicilia Landry & Becker, 2013
- Micrelephas pseudokadenii Landry, 2003
- Microcrambus arevaloi Landry, 2020
- Microcrambus leticiensis Landry, 2020
- Moma alpium rossanamartiniae L. Ronkay, G. Ronkay & Landry, 2023
- Mudaria arnaudmaederi L. Ronkay, G. Ronkay, Pekarsky & Landry, 2023
- Mudaria bogdanpopescui L. Ronkay, G. Ronkay, Pekarsky & Landry, 2023
- Mudaria helenetrudelae L. Ronkay, G. Ronkay, Pekarsky & Landry, 2023
- Mudaria stahlgretschae L. Ronkay, G. Ronkay, Pekarsky & Landry, 2023
- Mudaria vallottoni L. Ronkay, G. Ronkay, Pekarsky & Landry, 2023
- Myelobia nicaraguensis Landry & Maes, 2015
- Neodactria cochisensis Landry & Albu, 2012
- Neodactria daemonis Landry & Klots, 2005
- Neodactria glenni Landry & Klots, 2002
- Neodactria oktibbeha Landry & Brown, 2005
- Neohelvibotys hoecki Landry, 2015
- Neoleucinodes galapagensis Landry, 2016
- Neurostrota brunnea Landry, 2006
- Neurostrota magnifica Landry, 2006
- Nevadapteryx albui Landry, 2025
- Nevadapteryx esmeraldensis Landry & Léger, 2025
- Oidaematophorus cristobalis Landry & Gielis, 1992
- Oidaematophorus devriesi Landry & Gielis, 1992
- Orthosia (Monima) helenae Landry, L. Ronkay & G. Ronkay, 2020
- Palpita hispaniolaensis Landry & Solis, 2025
- Palpita maribelae Landry & Solis, 2025
- Parapediasia galapagensis Landry & Léger, 2024
- Parapediasia torquatella Landry, 1995
- Paraplatyptilia atlantica Landry & Gielis, 2008
- Periploca darwini Landry, 2001
- Periploca longipenis Landry, 2001
- Phlogophora albovittata barbuti L. Ronkay, G. Ronkay & Landry, 2023
- Platyptilia nigroapicalis Landry & Gielis, 1992
- Platyptilia vilema Landry, 1993
- Postplatyptilia chicaquensis Landry & Gielis, 2022
- Postplatyptilia huigraica Landry & Gielis, 1992
- Postplatyptilia minima Landry & Gielis, 1992
- Prays galapagosella Landry & Landry, 1998
- Proteoteras atromacula Razowski & Landry, 2008
- Prototheora katangensis Landry & Davis, 2018
- Prototheora tanzaniensis Landry & Davis, 2018
- Pyrausta galapagensis Landry, 2015
- Pyrausta insolata Landry, 2015
- Samea coffea Landry, 2016
- Samea inconspicuella Landry, 2016
- Schafferiessa galapagoensis Landry & Neunzig, 1998
- Schafferiessa pumila Landry & Neunzig, 1998
- Scrobipalpula caustonae Landry, 2010
- Scrobipalpula equatoriella Landry, 2010
- Scrobipalpula inornata Landry, 2010
- Scythris cristobalensis J.-F. Landry & B. Landry, 2025
- Sesamia bernardgisini L. Ronkay, G. Ronkay & Landry, 2023
- Shafferiessa galapagoensis Landry & Neunzig, 1997
- Sisyracera jacquelinae Landry, 2016
- Sparganothina alta Landry, 2001
- Sparganothina anopla Landry, 2001
- Sparganothina aureola Landry, 2001
- Sparganothina beckeri Landry, 2001
- Sparganothina browni Landry, 2001
- Sparganothina costaricana Landry, 2001
- Sparganothina covelli Landry, 2001
- Sparganothina cristata Landry, 2001
- Sparganothina cultrata Landry, 2001
- Sparganothina flammea Landry, 2001
- Sparganothina inbiana Landry, 2001
- Sparganothina irregularis Landry, 2001
- Sparganothina laselvana Landry, 2001
- Sparganothina lutea Landry, 2001
- Sparganothina nana Landry, 2001
- Sparganothina neoamoebaea Landry, 2001
- Sparganothina pollicis Landry, 2001
- Sparganothina setosa Landry, 2001
- Sparganothina spinulosa Landry, 2001
- Sparganothina tena Landry, 2001
- Sparganothina ternaria Landry, 2001
- Sparganothina trispinosa Landry, 2001
- Sparganothina venezolana Landry, 2001
- Sparganothina veracruzana Landry, 2001
- Sparganothina volcanica Landry, 2001
- Stegasta francisci Landry, 2010
- Stenoptilodes gielisi Landry, 1993
- Stilbosis schmitzi Landry, 2008
- Symmetrischema escondidella Landry, 2010
- Tebenna galapagoensis Heppner & Landry, 1994
- Thaumatopsis mayelisae Landry, 2025
- Thaumatopsis powelli Landry, 2025
- Udea galapagensis Landry, 2016
- Udea sideralis Landry, 2016
- Undulambia lindbladi Landry & Roque-Albelo, 2006
- Untomia lunatella Landry, 2010
- Utetheisa connerorum Landry & Roque-Albelo, 2009
- Utetheisa henrii Landry & Roque-Albelo, 2009

== Publications ==
=== 1980s ===
- Landry, Bernard (1989). "Geina sheppardi, a new species of grape-feeding Platyptiliinae (Lepidoptera: Pterophoridae) from eastern North America, with notes on related species". The Canadian Entomologist. 121 (9): 763–770. doi:10.4039/Ent121763-9.

=== 1990s ===
- Landry, Bernard (1990). "Two new species of Diptychophora from Mexico (Lepidoptera: Pyralidae: Crambinae: Diptychophorini)". The Canadian Entomologist. 122 (6): 1071–1077. doi:10.4039/Ent1221071-11.
- Heppner, John B.; Landry, Bernard (1994). "A New Tebenna Species from the Galápagos Islands (Lepidoptera: Choreutidae)". Tropical Lepidoptera. 5 (2): 123–125.
- Heppner, John B.; Landry, Bernard (1994). "A new sun moth from the Galápagos Islands (Lepidoptera: Heliodinidae)". Tropical Lepidoptera. 5 (2): 126–128.
- Landry, Bernard (1995). A phylogenetic analysis of the major lineages of the Crambinae and of the genera of Crambini of North America (Lepidoptera: Pyralidae). Memoirs on Entomology, International. Vol. 1. Gainesville, Florida: Associated Publishers. p. 242. ISBN 1-56665-056-9.
- Adamski, David; Landry, Bernard (1997). "Review of the Blastobasinae (Lepidoptera: Gelechioidea: Coleophoridae) of the Galápagos Islands". Proceedings of the Entomological Society of Washington. 99 (2): 348–358.

=== 2000s ===
- Landry, Bernard; Powell, Jerry A. (2001). Systematics and phylogeny of Sparganothina and related taxa (Lepidoptera: Tortricidae: Sparganothini). University of California Publications in Entomology. Vol. 121. University of California Press. p. 82. ISBN 978-0-520-09840-4.
- Landry, Bernard (2002). "Galagete, a new genus of Autostichidae representing the first case of an extensive radiation of endemic Lepidoptera in the Galápagos Islands". Revue suisse de zoologie. 109 (4): 813–868. doi:10.5962/bhl.part.79573.
- Landry, Bernard (2003). "Revision of the Neotropical genus Micrelephas (Lepidoptera: Pyralidae: Crambinae)". Tropical Lepidoptera. 11 (1–2): 13–27.
- Landry, Bernard; Roque-Albelo, Luis (2004). "First report of Tischeriidae (Lepidoptera) on the Galapagos Islands, Ecuador, with descriptions of two new endemic species". Revue suisse de zoologie. 111 (3): 599–609. doi:10.5962/bhl.part.80255.
- Schmitz, Patrick; Landry, Bernard (2005). "Two new taxa of Galagete (Lepidoptera, Autostichidae) from the Galápagos Islands, Ecuador". Revue suisse de zoologie. 112 (2): 511–517. doi:10.5962/bhl.part.80310.
- Vargas, Héctor A.; Landry, Bernard (2005). "A new genus and species of Gracillariidae (Lepidoptera) feeding on flowers of Acacia macracantha Willd. (Mimosaceae) in Chile". Acta Entomologica Chilena. 29 (1): 47–57.
- Landry, Bernard (2006). "The Gracillariidae (Lepidoptera, Gracillarioidea) of the Galapagos Islands, Ecuador, with notes on some of their relatives". Revue suisse de zoologie. 113 (3): 437–485. doi:10.5962/bhl.part.80359.
- Adamski, David; Landry, Bernard (2007). "Additions to the Blastobasinae (Lepidoptera: Coleophoridae) of the Galapagos Islands with description of a new Holcocera Clemens". Acta Zoologica Academiae Scientiarum Hungaricae. 53 (supplement 1): 13–20.
- Schmitz, Patrick; Landry, Bernard (2007). "Two new species of Chionodes Hübner from Ecuador, with a summary of known Galapagos records of Gelechiidae (Lepidoptera)". Revue suisse de zoologie. 114 (2): 175–184. doi:10.5962/bhl.part.80393.
- Landry, Bernard; Roque-Albelo, Luis (2008). "Additions to the Cosmopterigidae (Lepidoptera) of the Galapagos Islands, Ecuador, with description of a new species of Stilbosis Clemens". Revue suisse de zoologie. 115 (2): 303–309. doi:10.5962/bhl.part.80427.
- Landry, Bernard; Schmitz, Patrick (2008). "A striking new endemic species of Galagete Landry (Lepidoptera, Autostichidae) from the Galapagos Islands, Ecuador". Revue suisse de zoologie. 115 (3): 575–583. doi:10.5962/bhl.part.80446.
- Razowski, Józef; Landry, Bernard; Roque-Albelo, Luis (2008). "The Tortricidae (Lepidoptera) of the Galapagos Islands, Ecuador". Revue suisse de zoologie. 115 (1): 185–220. doi:10.5962/bhl.part.80425.
- Roque-Albelo, Luis; Landry, Bernard (2009). "Two new species of Utetheisa Hübner (Lepidoptera, Noctuidae, Arctiinae) from the Galapagos Islands, Ecuador". ZooKeys (21): 55–72. Bibcode:2009ZooK...21...55R. doi:10.3897/zookeys.21.201.

=== 2010s ===
- Landry, Bernard; Albu, Valeriu (2012). "A new species of Neodactria Landry, 1995 (Lepidoptera: Pyralidae, Crambinae) from Arizona, U.S.A.". Journal of Research on the Lepidoptera. 45: 113–118. doi:10.5962/p.266488.
- Landry, Bernard; Becker, Vitor O.; Mally, Richard (2013). "Breaking the pattern again: additions to Micrelephas Dognin, 1905 (Lepidoptera; Pyralidae; Crambinae), including a new species and a key". Tropical Lepidoptera Research. 23 (2): 99–112.
- Landry, Bernard (2015). "The Pyraustinae (Lepidoptera, Pyralidae s. l.) of the Galápagos Islands, Ecuador". Revue suisse de zoologie. 122 (1): 55–70. doi:10.5281/zenodo.14577.
- Landry, Bernard; Maes, Jean-Michel; Passoa, Steven C.; Léger, Thierry (2015). "Description of a new species of Myelobia Herrich-Schäffer (Lepidoptera, Pyralidae s.l., Crambinae) from Nicaragua feeding on cultivated bamboo, Guadua aculeata Rupr. ex E. Fourn. (Poaceae)". Journal of Research on the Lepidoptera. 48: 65–81. doi:10.5962/p.266474.
- Landry, Bernard (2016). "Taxonomic revision of the Spilomelinae (Lepidoptera, Pyralidae s. l.) of the Galápagos Islands, Ecuador". Revue suisse de zoologie. 123 (2): 315–399.
- Landry, Bernard; Davis, Donald R. (2018). "Two new species of Prototheora Meyrick from the Democratic Republic of the Congo and Tanzania representing the northernmost records for the genus (Lepidoptera: Hepialidae)". Revue suisse de zoologie. 125 (1): 129–135.
- Léger, Thierry; Landry, Bernard; Nuss, Matthias (2019). "Phylogeny, character evolution and tribal classification in Crambinae and Scopariinae (Lepidoptera, Crambidae)". Systematic Entomology. 44 (4): 757–776. Bibcode:2019SysEn..44..757L. doi:10.1111/syen.12353.
- De Prins, Jurgen; Arévalo-Maldonado, Hugo A.; Davis, Donald R.; Landry, Bernard; Vargas, Héctor A.; Davis, Mark M.; Brito, Rafael; Fochezato, Juliana; Ohshima, Ichiro; Moreira, Gilson P. (2019). "An illustrated catalogue of the Neotropical Gracillariidae (Lepidoptera) with new data on primary types". Zootaxa. 4575 (1): 1–110. doi:10.11646/zootaxa.4575.1.1. PMID 31715785.

=== 2020s ===
- Landry, Bernard (2020). "On the Pyraloidea fauna of Nicaragua". Tropical Lepidoptera Research. 30 (2): 93–104. doi:10.5281/zenodo.4317575.
- Landry, Bernard; Becker, Vitor O. (2021). "A taxonomic review of the genus Diptychophora Zeller (Lepidoptera, Pyralidae sensu lato, Crambinae) in Brazil, with descriptions of three new species". Revue suisse de zoologie. 128 (1): 73–84. doi:10.35929/RSZ.0036.
- Landry, Bernard; Gielis, Cees (2022). "On the Pterophoridae (Lepidoptera) of Colombia". Tropical Lepidoptera Research. 32 (2): 100–108. doi:10.5281/zenodo.7246187.
- Raviglione, Maria C.; Rougerie, Rodolphe; Zolotuhin, Vladimir V.; Malm, Thomas; Landry, Bernard (2022). "New information on Trichophiala devylderi Aurivillius, 1879. Full description of both sexes, genetic study and lectotype designation (Lepidoptera, Eupterotidae)". Revue suisse de zoologie. 129 (1): 283–296. doi:10.35929/RSZ.0075.
- Landry, Bernard; Bilat, Julia; Hayden, James; Solis, M. Alma; Lees, David C.; Alvarez, Nicolas; Léger, Thierry; Gauthier, Joël (2023). "The identity of Argyria lacteella (Fabricius, 1794) (Lepidoptera, Pyraloidea, Crambinae), synonyms, and related species revealed by morphology and DNA capture in type specimens". ZooKeys (1146): 1–42. Bibcode:2023ZooK.1146....1L. doi:10.3897/zookeys.1146.96099. PMC 10208364. PMID 37234290.
- Landry, Jean-François; Landry, Bernard; Goldstein, Paul Z. (2023). "On the species formerly assigned to Schrankia Hübner (Erebidae: Hypenodinae) in the Western Hemisphere, with the revalidation of Hypenopsis Dyar and descriptions of three new species". Revue suisse de zoologie. 130 (2): 353–387. doi:10.35929/RSZ.0109.
- Landry, Bernard (2024). "Taxonomic revision of the Crambinae (Lepidoptera, Pyralidae sensu lato) of the Galápagos Islands, Ecuador". Revue suisse de zoologie. 131 (2): 357–387. doi:10.35929/RSZ.0129.
- Warren, Andrew D.; Ferris, Clifford D.; Landry, Bernard; Gauthier, Joël; Léger, Thierry; Bilat, Julia; Nunes, Carla A. (2025). "A New Genus and Species of Crambinae (Pyraloidea: Crambidae) with Brachypterous Females from Colorado, U.S.A.". Journal of the Lepidopterists' Society. 79 (2): 73–84. doi:10.18473/lepi.79i2.a1.
