= C. tenellus =

C. tenellus may refer to one of the following species:

- Catharylla tenellus, a moth species
- Circulifer tenellus, the beet leafhopper, a leafhopper species
- Cleptometopus tenellus, a beetle species
- Cyanococcus tenellus, a synonym for Vaccinium tenellum, the small black blueberry
- Cyperus tenellus, tiny flatsedge, a plant species
