= Coleophora cisoriella =

Scientific classification
- Kingdom: Animalia
- Phylum: Arthropoda
- Clade: Pancrustacea
- Class: Insecta
- Order: Lepidoptera
- Family: Coleophoridae
- Genus: Coleophora
- Species: C. cisoriella

Binomial name
- Coleophora cisoriella Landry, 2005

Species of moth

Coleophora cisoriella is a moth of the family Coleophoridae. It was first described from Minas Gerais in southeastern Brazil. It is closely related to Coleophora xyridella.
