= Galagete consimilis =

Scientific classification
- Kingdom: Animalia
- Phylum: Arthropoda
- Clade: Pancrustacea
- Class: Insecta
- Order: Lepidoptera
- Family: Autostichidae
- Genus: Galagete
- Species: G. consimilis

Binomial name
- Galagete consimilis Landry, 2002

Species of moth

Galagete consimilis is a moth in the family Autostichidae. It was described by Bernard Landry in 2002. It is found on the Galápagos Islands.

The wingspan is 8.5–9 mm for males and 8.5–10 mm for females. Adults have been recorded on wing in February, March and August.

== Etymology ==
The species name refers to the similarity between Galagete consimilis and Galagete darwini.
