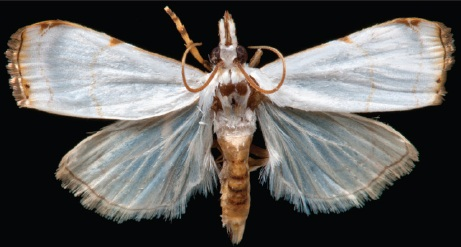
- Catharylla mayrabonillae

Scientific classification
- Kingdom: Animalia
- Phylum: Arthropoda
- Class: Insecta
- Order: Lepidoptera
- Family: Crambidae
- Subfamily: Crambinae
- Tribe: incertae sedis
- Genus: Catharylla; Zeller, 1863

= Catharylla =

Genus of moths

Catharylla is a genus of moths of the family Crambidae. It has Neotropical distribution from Costa Rica to southern Brazil.

== Taxonomy ==
The genus Catharylla was erected in 1863 by the German entomologist Philipp Christoph Zeller. In 1922, the American entomologist William Schaus designated Catharylla tenellus as the type species of the genus. The genus has traditionally been placed in the tribe Argyriini, but phylogenetic analyses do not support this placement. Instead, the genus seems to be most closely related to Micrelephas.

== Description ==
Catharylla species have snow white to creamy white wings and short labial palpi. They can be separated from other Argyriini by the presence on the forewing of median and subterminal thin transverse lines, slightly curved, convex on costal 1/3. The labial palpi are also shorter in comparison to those of Vaxi. The highly variable male genitalia do not show any synapomorphy or generic diagnostic character. In females, a possible synapomorphy is the strongly reduced anterior and posterior apophyses of abdominal segments VIII and IX, but this is shared with some Crambini and a few other Crambinae.

== Distribution ==
The genus is restricted to the Neotropics, from Costa Rica to Santa Catarina, Brazil, at elevations of 0 to 1300 m.

== Species list ==
- Catharylla bijuga T. Léger & B. Landry, 2014
- Catharylla chelicerata T. Léger & B. Landry, 2014
- Catharylla coronata T. Léger & B. Landry, 2014
- Catharylla gigantea T. Léger & B. Landry, 2014
- Catharylla mayrabonillae T. Léger & B. Landry, 2014
- Catharylla paulella Schaus, 1922
- Catharylla serrabonita T. Léger & B. Landry, 2014
- Catharylla tenellus (Zeller, 1839)

=== Former species ===
- Catharylla contiguella Zeller, 1872 (see Argyria)
- Catharylla interrupta Zeller, 1866 (see Argyria)
- Catharylla sericina (Zeller, 1881) (see Argyria)
