= S. lutea =

S. lutea may refer to:

- Salix lutea, a willow native to North America
- Salpistele lutea, a Panamanian orchid
- Saponaria lutea, an Old World plant
- Sarcina lutea, a gram-positive bacterium
- Scorpaena lutea, a venomous fish
- Scrobipalpa lutea, a twirler moth
- Sicalis lutea, a South American bird
- Sillago lutea, a marine fish
- Siphona lutea, a tachina fly
- Sparganothina lutea, an Ecuadorian moth
- Spilarctia lutea, an Asian moth
- Spondias lutea, a plant native to the tropical Americas
- Stelis lutea, an epiphytic orchid
- Sternbergia lutea, a plant with yellow flowers
- Streptocarpus lutea, an Afrotropical plant
- Striga lutea, a hemiparasitic plant
- Stromanthe lutea, a plant native to the tropical Americas
- Strongylophthalmyia lutea, a long-legged fly
- Strymon lutea, a scrub hairstreak
- Styposis lutea, a tangle-web spider
- Syncopacma lutea, a twirler moth
