= List of gelechiid genera: U =

The large moth family Gelechiidae contains the following genera:

- Untomia
