= Untomia lunatella =

Scientific classification
- Kingdom: Animalia
- Phylum: Arthropoda
- Clade: Pancrustacea
- Class: Insecta
- Order: Lepidoptera
- Family: Gelechiidae
- Genus: Untomia
- Species: U. lunatella

Binomial name
- Untomia lunatella Landry, 2010

Species of moth

Untomia lunatella is a moth of the family Gelechiidae. It was described by Bernard Landry in 2010. It is found on the Galápagos Islands.
