= Galagete pecki =

Scientific classification
- Kingdom: Animalia
- Phylum: Arthropoda
- Clade: Pancrustacea
- Class: Insecta
- Order: Lepidoptera
- Family: Autostichidae
- Genus: Galagete
- Species: G. pecki

Binomial name
- Galagete pecki Landry, 2002

Species of moth

Galagete pecki is a moth in the family Autostichidae. It was described by Bernard Landry in 2002. It is found on the Galápagos Islands.

== Subspecies ==
- Galagete pecki pecki
- Galagete pecki flavofasciata Schmitz & Landry, 2005
