= Sparganothina trispinosa =

Scientific classification
- Kingdom: Animalia
- Phylum: Arthropoda
- Clade: Pancrustacea
- Class: Insecta
- Order: Lepidoptera
- Family: Tortricidae
- Genus: Sparganothina
- Species: S. trispinosa

Binomial name
- Sparganothina trispinosa Landry, in Landry & Powell, 2001

Species of moth

Sparganothina trispinosa is a species of moth of the family Tortricidae. It is found in Costa Rica.
