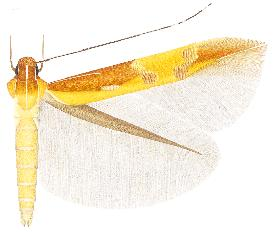

Scientific classification
- Kingdom: Animalia
- Phylum: Arthropoda
- Clade: Pancrustacea
- Class: Insecta
- Order: Lepidoptera
- Family: Cosmopterigidae
- Genus: Cosmopterix
- Species: C. galapagosensis

Binomial name
- Cosmopterix galapagosensis Landry, 2001

= Cosmopterix galapagosensis =

Species of moth

Cosmopterix galapagosensis is a moth of the family Cosmopterigidae. It is known from the Galapagos Islands.

== Description ==
Male, female. Forewing length 4.5-4.8 mm.

Head: frons shining pale ochreous-grey with greenish and reddish reflections, vertex and neck tufts shining bronze brown with reddish gloss, laterally and medially lined white, collar shining bronze brown; labial palpus first segment very short, white, second segment four-fifths of the length of third, dark brown with white longitudinal lines laterally and ventrally, third segment white, lined dark brown laterally; scape dorsally dark brown with white anterior and dorsal lines, ventrally white, antenna shining dark brown, a white line at base, changing into an interrupted line to beyond one-half, followed towards apex by an annulated part of about ten segments, six dark brown, four white, two dark brown, two white, nine dark brown, four white and three dark brown segments at apex. Thorax and tegulae shining yellowish brown with reddish gloss, thorax posteriorly yellowish and with a white median line, tegulae very narrowly lined white inwardly.

Legs: shining dark olive brown with reddish gloss, femora pale ochreous, foreleg with a white line on tibia and tarsal segments one to three and five, tibia of midleg with white narrow oblique basal and medial streaks and a white apical ring, tarsal segments one to three with ochreous-white apical rings, segment five entirely ochreous-white, tibia of hindleg as midleg, but with an additional subapical oblique white streak, tarsal segment one with ochreous subbasal and apical rings, remaining segments with ochreous apical rings, spurs shining white dorsally, ochreous-grey ventrally. Forewing shining bronze brown with reddish gloss, the basal area, below fold, to transverse fascia pale yellow, two white lines in the basal area, a narrow subcostal to one-quarter, slightly bending from costa, a broad and short yellowish white dorsal at base, a silver metallic tubercular spot with pinkish reflection at one-quarter just below fold, a pale yellow transverse fascia beyond the middle, narrowing towards dorsum and slightly darkened in the middle, bordered at the inner edge by two pale golden metallic subcostal and subdorsal spots with reddish and purple reflections, neither spot reaching costa nor dorsum, thus forming an inward oblique fascia, bordered at the outer edge by a broad outwardly oblique fascia, narrowed in the middle, beyond the outer metallic fascia pale yellow streaks on the costal and dorsal sides, the dorsal streak much longer than the costal, a narrow and indistinct whitish apical line from the dorsal pale yellow streak to apex, cilia bronze brown around apex, ochreous-grey towards dorsum. Hindwing shining grey with greenish and reddish gloss, cilia ochreous-grey. Underside: forewing shining greyish brown, hindwing shining greyish-brown in costal half, pale grey in dorsal half. Abdomen dorsally shining pale yellow, segments banded shining greyish white posteriorly, ventrally shining yellowish white, anal tuft whitish dorsally, grey ventrally, in the female abdomen is segment seven brownish grey and the anal tuft yellowish white.

== Biology ==
The larvae feed on Eleocharis mutata. They mine the leaves of their host plant. Adults were collected from January to March and in May.
