= Almita portalia =

Scientific classification
- Kingdom: Animalia
- Phylum: Arthropoda
- Clade: Pancrustacea
- Class: Insecta
- Order: Lepidoptera
- Family: Crambidae
- Genus: Almita
- Species: A. portalia

Binomial name
- Almita portalia B. Landry, 1995

Species of moth

Almita portalia is a moth in the family Crambidae. It was described by Bernard Landry in 1995. It is found in North America, where it has been recorded from Arizona and California.
