= Chileoptilia =

Scientific classification
- Kingdom: Animalia
- Phylum: Arthropoda
- Clade: Pancrustacea
- Class: Insecta
- Order: Lepidoptera
- Family: Gracillariidae
- Genus: Chileoptilia; Vargas & Landry, 2005
- Species: C. yaroella

Binomial name
- Chileoptilia yaroella Vargas & Landry, 2005

Genus of moths

Chileoptilia yaroella is a moth of the family Gracillariidae. It is known from Chile.

The larvae feed on Acacia macrantha.
