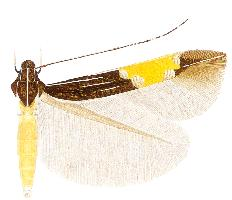

Scientific classification
- Kingdom: Animalia
- Phylum: Arthropoda
- Clade: Pancrustacea
- Class: Insecta
- Order: Lepidoptera
- Family: Cosmopterigidae
- Genus: Cosmopterix
- Species: C. yvani

Binomial name
- Cosmopterix yvani Landry, 2001

= Cosmopterix yvani =

Species of moth

Cosmopterix yvani is a moth of the family Cosmopterigidae. It is known from the Galapagos Islands.

Adults have been recorded from the last week of March to the last week of May.

== Description ==
Male. Forewing length 3.8 mm. Head: frons shining ochreous-white with greenish and reddish reflections, vertex and neck tufts dark bronze brown with reddish gloss, laterally and medially lined white, collar bronze brown; labial palpus first segment very short, white, second segment four-fifths of the length of third, brown with white longitudinal lines laterally and ventrally, third segment white, lined brown laterally; scape dark brown with white anterior and dorsal lines, white ventrally, antenna shining dark brown with a white line from base to just before one-half and changing into an interrupted line to three-fifths, followed towards apex by an annulated section of eight segments, seven dark brown, four white, two dark brown, two white, ten dark brown, three white and five dark brown segments at apex. Thorax dark bronze brown with reddish gloss and a white median line; tegulae bronze brown, inwardly lined white. Legs: ochreous-grey, femora of midleg and hindleg shining pale ochreous, foreleg with a white line on tibia and tarsal segments one to three and five, tibia of midleg with white oblique basal and medial lines and a white apical ring, tarsal segments one to three white except at base, segment five entirely white, tibia of hindleg with a very oblique white line from base to one-third, a second white lateral line nearly from base to spurs, from there towards dorsum as an oblique line to two-thirds, a short subapical white streak just before the white apical ring, first tarsal segment with a white basal and an ochreous-white apical ring, tarsal segments two to four with indistinct ochreous apical rings, tarsal segment five ochreous-white, spurs ochreous-white, ventrally with a dark grey streak. Forewing dark bronze brown with reddish gloss, five white lines in the basal area, a costal from one-quarter to the transverse fascia, a subcostal from base to two-fifths, slightly bending from costa, a short and straight medial above fold from one-quarter to near the transverse fascia, a slightly shorter subdorsal below fold, from one-third to just beyond the medial, a broad dorsal nearly from base to one-third and with some greenish and reddish reflections, a broad yellow transverse fascia beyond the middle, narrowed towards dorsum, bordered at the inner edge by two silver metallic, tubercular subcostal and subdorsal spots, the subdorsal spot further from base and slightly larger than the subcostal, bordered at the outer edge by two similarly coloured costal and dorsal spots, the dorsal spot twice as large as the costal and more towards base, the tubercular spots have purplish and greenish reflections, a narrow whitish costal streak apical from the outer costal spot and a shining white apical line inwardly not connected to the transverse fascia and ending in the cilia just before apex, cilia bronze brown around apex, brownish grey towards dorsum. Hindwing shining pale brownish grey, cilia brownish grey. Underside: forewing shining pale greyish brown, the white apical line indistinctly visible, hindwing greyish white, pale brownish grey at costa. Abdomen dorsally yellow, first segment yellowish white, laterally shining grey, ventrally shining white, in middle yellowish white, segments banded shining yellowish white posteriorly, anal tuft shining white.
