= Netechmodes =

Scientific classification
- Kingdom: Animalia
- Phylum: Arthropoda
- Class: Insecta
- Order: Lepidoptera
- Family: Tortricidae
- Tribe: Euliini
- Genus: Netechmodes; Razowski & Pelz, 2003

Genus of tortrix moths

Netechmodes is a genus of moths belonging to the family Tortricidae.

== Species ==
- Netechmodes gravidarmata Razowski & Wojtusiak, 2009
- Netechmodes harpago Razowski & Pelz, 2003
- Netechmodes landryi Razowski, 2004

== See also ==
- List of Tortricidae genera
