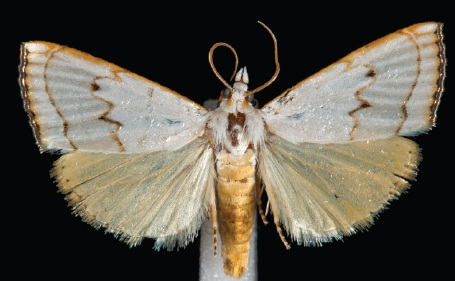

Scientific classification
- Kingdom: Animalia
- Phylum: Arthropoda
- Clade: Pancrustacea
- Class: Insecta
- Order: Lepidoptera
- Family: Crambidae
- Genus: Catharylla
- Species: C. serrabonita

Binomial name
- Catharylla serrabonita T. Léger & B. Landry, 2014

= Catharylla serrabonita =

Species of moth

Catharylla serrabonita is a moth of the family Crambidae described by Théo Léger and Bernard Landry in 2014. It is found in the Brazilian states of Bahia and Espírito Santo.

The length of the forewings is 10–14 mm for males and 14 mm for females. The costal line on the forewings is ochreous and the median transverse line is ochreous to brown. The subterminal transverse line is ochreous to brown. The hindwings are cream coloured, usually with more or less connected marginal brown spots.

== Etymology ==
The specific name refers to its type locality, the Serra Bonita Reserve in Bahia, Brazil.
