= Micrelephas kadenii =

Scientific classification
- Kingdom: Animalia
- Phylum: Arthropoda
- Clade: Pancrustacea
- Class: Insecta
- Order: Lepidoptera
- Family: Crambidae
- Subfamily: Crambinae
- Tribe: incertae sedis
- Genus: Micrelephas
- Species: M. kadenii

Binomial name
- Micrelephas kadenii (Zeller, 1863)

Synonyms
- Crambus kadenii Zeller, 1863

Species of moth

Micrelephas kadenii is a moth in the family Crambidae. It was described by Philipp Christoph Zeller in 1863, and is found in Venezuela.
