= Chionodes stefaniae =

Scientific classification
- Kingdom: Animalia
- Phylum: Arthropoda
- Clade: Pancrustacea
- Class: Insecta
- Order: Lepidoptera
- Family: Gelechiidae
- Genus: Chionodes
- Species: C. stefaniae

Binomial name
- Chionodes stefaniae Schmitz & Landry, 2007

Species of moth

Chionodes stefaniae is a moth in the family Gelechiidae. It is found in Ecuador, where it has been recorded from the Galapagos Islands.

== Etymology ==
The species is named in honour of Stefania Bertoli-Schmitz.
