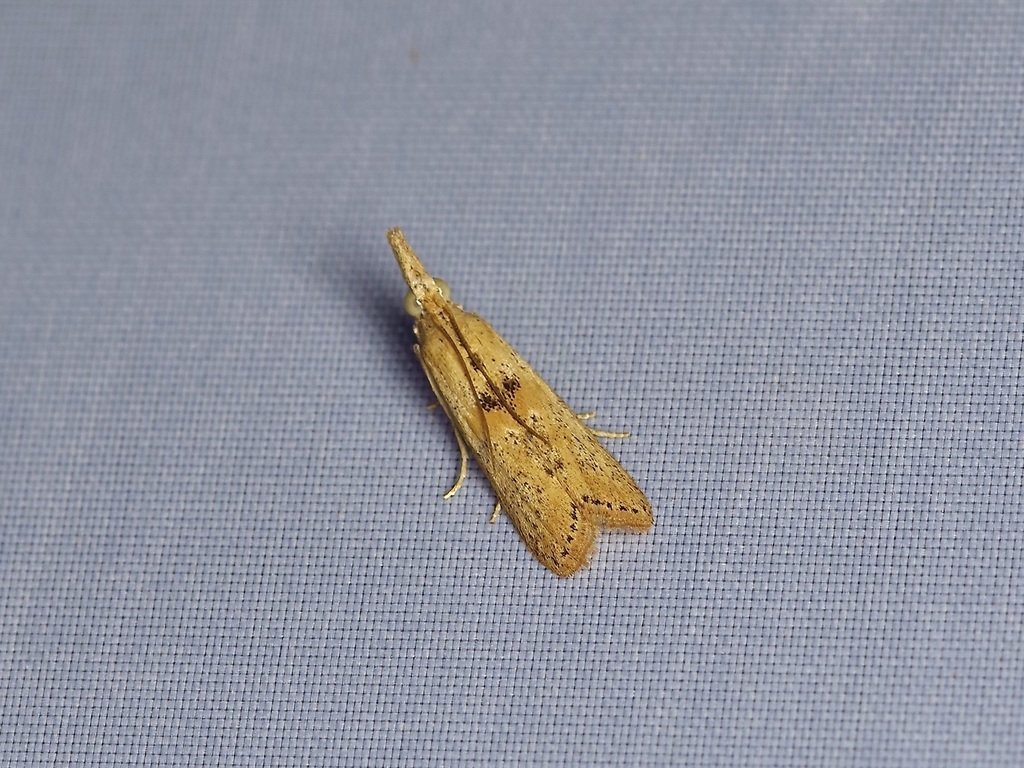

Scientific classification
- Kingdom: Animalia
- Phylum: Arthropoda
- Class: Insecta
- Order: Lepidoptera
- Family: Pyralidae
- Genus: Macrorrhinia
- Species: M. endonephele

Binomial name
- Macrorrhinia endonephele (Hampson, 1918)

Synonyms
- Rhinaphe endonephele Hampson, 1918; Macrorrhinia signifera A. Blanchard, 1976; Rhinaphe ignetincta Hampson, 1918

= Macrorrhinia endonephele =

Species of moth

Macrorrhinia endonephele is a species of snout moth in the genus Macrorrhinia. It was described by George Hampson in 1918, and it is known from the southern United States (including Texas, Alabama, Florida, Georgia, Oklahoma and South Carolina), but also in South America, including Argentina and Brazil.
