= Netechmodes gravidarmata =

Scientific classification
- Domain: Eukaryota
- Kingdom: Animalia
- Phylum: Arthropoda
- Class: Insecta
- Order: Lepidoptera
- Family: Tortricidae
- Genus: Netechmodes
- Species: N. gravidarmata

Binomial name
- Netechmodes gravidarmata Razowski & Wojtusiak, 2009

Species of moth

Netechmodes gravidarmata is a species of moth of the family Tortricidae. It is found in Ecuador in the provinces of Loja and Tungurahua.

The wingspan is 20 mm.
