= Sparganothina refugiana =

Scientific classification
- Kingdom: Animalia
- Phylum: Arthropoda
- Clade: Pancrustacea
- Class: Insecta
- Order: Lepidoptera
- Family: Tortricidae
- Genus: Sparganothina
- Species: S. refugiana

Binomial name
- Sparganothina refugiana Razowski & Wojtusiak, 2010

Species of moth

Sparganothina refugiana is a species of moth of the family Tortricidae. It is known from the Yanachaga–Chemillén National Park in the Pasco Region, Peru. The holotype was collected at 2,460 m (8,070 ft) above sea level.

Their wingspan is about 23 mm for the holotype, a male.
