= Neurostrota pithecolobiella =

Scientific classification
- Kingdom: Animalia
- Phylum: Arthropoda
- Class: Insecta
- Order: Lepidoptera
- Family: Gracillariidae
- Genus: Neurostrota
- Species: N. pithecolobiella

Binomial name
- Neurostrota pithecolobiella Busck, [1934]

Species of moth

Neurostrota pithecolobiella is a moth of the family Gracillariidae. It is known from Cuba.

The larvae feed on Samanea saman. They mine the stem of their host plant.
