= Netechmodes harpago =

Scientific classification
- Kingdom: Animalia
- Phylum: Arthropoda
- Class: Insecta
- Order: Lepidoptera
- Family: Tortricidae
- Genus: Netechmodes
- Species: N. harpago

Binomial name
- Netechmodes harpago Razowski & Pelz, 2003

Species of moth

Netechmodes harpago is a species of moth of the family Tortricidae. It is found in Ecuador (Morona-Santiago Province).
