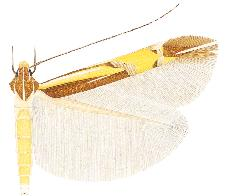

Scientific classification
- Kingdom: Animalia
- Phylum: Arthropoda
- Clade: Pancrustacea
- Class: Insecta
- Order: Lepidoptera
- Family: Cosmopterigidae
- Genus: Cosmopterix
- Species: C. madeleinae

Binomial name
- Cosmopterix madeleinae Landry, 2001

= Cosmopterix madeleinae =

Species of moth

Cosmopterix madeleinae is a moth of the family Cosmopterigidae. It is known from the Galapagos Islands.

Adults have been recorded from the end of January to the end of May and in October. There is probably more than one generation per year.

== Description ==
Male, female. Forewing length 4.1 mm. Head: frons shining pale ochreous with greenish and reddish reflections, vertex pale ochreous-yellow, neck tufts shining bronze brown with reddish gloss, laterally and medially lined white, collar shining bronze brown; labial palpus first segment very short, white, second segment four-fifths of the length of third, dark brown with white longitudinal lines laterally and ventrally, third segment white, lined brown laterally; scape dorsally dark brown with white anterior and dorsal lines, ventrally yellowish white, antenna shining dark brown with a white line from base to two-fifths, changing into an interrupted line to beyond one-half, followed towards apex by an annulate part of ten segments, twelve dark brown, one white, one dark brown, two white, two dark brown, two white, ten dark brown, three white and three dark brown segments at apex. Thorax and tegulae shining yellowish brown with reddish gloss, thorax with a white median line, tegulae lined white inwardly. Legs: shining dark greyish brown with reddish gloss, femora yellowish white, foreleg with a white line on tibia and tarsal segments one, two, three (only basal half) and five, tibia of midleg with white narrow oblique basal and medial streaks and a white apical ring, tarsal segments ochreous, segments one and two each with a dark brown basal spot dorsally and segment four entirely ochreous-brown, tibia of hindleg as midleg, but with an additional subapical oblique white streak, tarsal segments ochreous, segment one greyish brown at base and with a very oblique greyish-brown streak laterally on the outside, segments two and three each with a dark brown basal spot dorsally, spurs shining white. Forewing shining bronze brown, costal half of the basal area pale yellow except at costa and strongly narrowing just prior to the transverse fascia, four white lines in the basal area, a costal from two-fifths to the transverse fascia, a broad subcostal at the costal side of the pale yellow section from base nearly to the end of this section, a slightly oblique subdorsal from two-fifths to one-half, a narrow dorsal from base to one-quarter, a pale yellow transverse fascia beyond the middle, narrowing towards dorsum, bordered at the inner edge by a tubercular very pale golden metallic, outwardly oblique fascia with pinkish reflection, not reaching costa and with a very small patch of blackish scales on the outside above middle, bordered at the outer edge by a similarly coloured but narrower, slightly inwardly oblique, fascia, inwardly lined dark brown at costa and dorsum, both fasciae narrowed in the middle and with their widest parts on dorsum, beyond the outer fascia a narrow pale yellow spot on costa and a triangular pale yellow spot on dorsum, outer fascia outwardly edged by a whitish costal streak, a broad white apical line from the middle of the apical area, cilia bronze brown around apex, greyish brown towards dorsum. Hindwing shining pale ochreous-brown, cilia greyish brown. Underside: forewing shining greyish brown, the white apical line visible, hindwing shining greyish brown in costal half, greyish white in dorsal half. Abdomen dorsally shining pale yellow, segments banded shining white posteriorly, ventrally shining white, anal tuft shining white.
