= Sparganothina nephela =

Scientific classification
- Kingdom: Animalia
- Phylum: Arthropoda
- Clade: Pancrustacea
- Class: Insecta
- Order: Lepidoptera
- Family: Tortricidae
- Genus: Sparganothina
- Species: S. nephela

Binomial name
- Sparganothina nephela (Walsingham, 1913)

Synonyms
- Sparganothis nephela Walsingham, 1913

Species of moth

Sparganothina nephela is a species of moth of the family Tortricidae. It is found in Nicaragua, Costa Rica, Panama and Ecuador.
