= Macrorrhinia pinta =

Scientific classification
- Kingdom: Animalia
- Phylum: Arthropoda
- Clade: Pancrustacea
- Class: Insecta
- Order: Lepidoptera
- Family: Pyralidae
- Genus: Macrorrhinia
- Species: M. pinta

Binomial name
- Macrorrhinia pinta Landry & Neunzig, 1998

Species of moth

Macrorrhinia pinta is a species of snout moth in the genus Macrorrhinia. It was described by Bernard Landry and Herbert H. Neunzig in 1998 and is known from Pinta Island (from which its species epithet is derived), of the Galápagos Islands in Ecuador.
