= Sparganothina setosa =

Scientific classification
- Kingdom: Animalia
- Phylum: Arthropoda
- Clade: Pancrustacea
- Class: Insecta
- Order: Lepidoptera
- Family: Tortricidae
- Genus: Sparganothina
- Species: S. setosa

Binomial name
- Sparganothina setosa Landry, in Landry & Powell, 2001

Species of moth

Sparganothina setosa is a species of moth of the family Tortricidae. It is found in Guerrero, Mexico.

The length of the forewings is about 8 mm.
