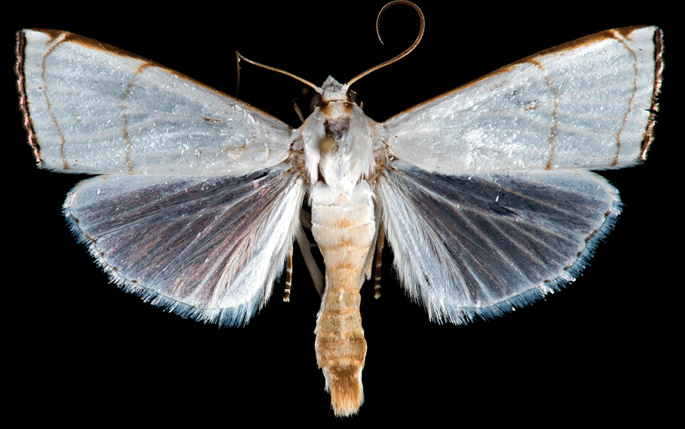

Scientific classification
- Kingdom: Animalia
- Phylum: Arthropoda
- Clade: Pancrustacea
- Class: Insecta
- Order: Lepidoptera
- Family: Crambidae
- Genus: Catharylla
- Species: C. chelicerata

Binomial name
- Catharylla chelicerata T. Léger & B. Landry, 2014

= Catharylla chelicerata =

Species of moth

Catharylla chelicerata is a moth of the family Crambidae described by Théo Léger and Bernard Landry in 2014. It is found in French Guiana and Amazonas, Brazil.

The length of the forewings is 10.5–15 mm for males and 15–19.5 mm for females. The costal band of the forewings is wide and brown from the base to the apex. The median and subterminal transverse lines are faded brown and there are dark brown spots on the apical margin, forming a more or less continuous line. The hindwings are snow white, with marginal spots between the veins.

== Etymology ==
The species name refers to the shape of the costal arms of the male valve, which look like mygalomorph chelicerae (spider mouthparts).
