= Chionodes manabiensis =

Scientific classification
- Kingdom: Animalia
- Phylum: Arthropoda
- Clade: Pancrustacea
- Class: Insecta
- Order: Lepidoptera
- Family: Gelechiidae
- Genus: Chionodes
- Species: C. manabiensis

Binomial name
- Chionodes manabiensis Schmitz & Landry, 2007

Species of moth

Chionodes manabiensis is a moth in the family Gelechiidae. It is found in Ecuador.

The wingspan is 9–10 mm for males and 9.5-11.9 mm for females.

== Etymology ==
The species name is derived from Manabí, Ecuador, the type locality.
