= Untomia rotundata =

Scientific classification
- Domain: Eukaryota
- Kingdom: Animalia
- Phylum: Arthropoda
- Class: Insecta
- Order: Lepidoptera
- Family: Gelechiidae
- Genus: Untomia
- Species: U. rotundata

Binomial name
- Untomia rotundata Walsingham, 1911

Species of moth

Untomia rotundata is a moth of the family Gelechiidae. It was described by Thomas de Grey, 6th Baron Walsingham, in 1911. It is found in Mexico (Tabasco).

The wingspan is about 8.5 mm. The forewings are whitish ochreous, slightly suffused with brownish olivaceous. Along the base of the dorsum is a strong brownish patch reaching to beyond one-third, its outer end becoming nearly black, produced upward and outward to a point on the middle of the wing. Beyond it above the tornus are two or three slender black lines, of which the upper one is curved. The outer half of the costa is black the inner edge of the black patch obliquely defined from a little before the middle, in it are two short oblique whitish streaks before the rounded apex, which is marked by a semicircular black line extending around the termen at the base of the whitish ochreous cilia, which are nearly black on their outer half above the middle. On the extreme base of the costa is a short black streak. The hindwings are dull grey, suffused with brownish fuscous.
