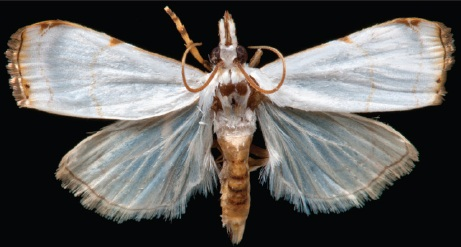

Scientific classification
- Kingdom: Animalia
- Phylum: Arthropoda
- Clade: Pancrustacea
- Class: Insecta
- Order: Lepidoptera
- Family: Crambidae
- Genus: Catharylla
- Species: C. mayrabonillae

Binomial name
- Catharylla mayrabonillae T. Léger & B. Landry, 2014

= Catharylla mayrabonillae =

Species of moth

Catharylla mayrabonillae is a moth of the family Crambidae described by Théo Léger and Bernard Landry in 2014. It is found in Costa Rica, Panama, Colombia, Venezuela, the Guianas (Guyana, Suriname, French Guiana), Ecuador, Peru, and Brazil (Acre, Amazonas, Distritò Federal, Pará, Rondônia).

The length of the forewings is 7.5–8.5 mm for males and 9.5–10.5 mm for females. The costal line on the forewings is ochreous or white in the basal half and white in the apical half. The median transverse line is ochreous and the subterminal transverse line is ochreous. The hindwings are white with a thin faded ochreous transverse subterminal line.

== Etymology ==
The species is named in honour of Ms. Mayra Bonilla in recognition of her artistic portrayal of the biodiversity and ecosystems of Costa Rica.
