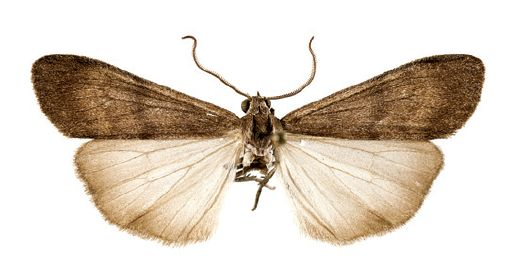

Scientific classification
- Kingdom: Animalia
- Phylum: Arthropoda
- Clade: Pancrustacea
- Class: Insecta
- Order: Lepidoptera
- Superfamily: Noctuoidea
- Family: Erebidae
- Subfamily: Arctiinae
- Genus: Utetheisa
- Species: U. henrii

Binomial name
- Utetheisa henrii Roque-Albelo & B. Landry, 2009

= Utetheisa henrii =

Species of moth

Utetheisa henrii is a moth of the family Erebidae. Formally described in 2009, it is named after Henri, the Grand Duke of Luxembourg. It is endemic to the island of San Cristóbal in the Galápagos. The length of the forewings is 14–16 mm for males and 16–17 mm for females. Its larvae probably feed on Tournefortia species.

== Taxonomy ==
Utetheisa henrii was formally described in 2009 based on a male specimen collected from San Cristóbal in the Galápagos Islands. The species is named after Henri, the Grand Duke of Luxembourg, who has provided funding and support for research and conservation in the Galápagos Islands.

== Description ==
Males have a forewing length of 14–16 mm. The head is brownish, with some white on the edge of the eye. The antennae are dorsally light brown, with whitish bases. The forewing is brown with some darker maculations, while the hind-wing is a pale grayish-brown. The wings are paler and less maculated ventrally than dorsally. The abdomen is whitish-brown, the patagia are beige-speckled, and the tegulae are brown. Females are broadly similar to males in their appearance, but have forewing lengths of 16–17 mm.

== Distribution and habitat ==
Utetheisa henrii is only found on the island of San Cristóbal in the Galápagos Islands, a province of Ecuador. It inhabits moist habitats in the island's highlands, with its larvae probably feeding on Tournefortia species.
