= Untomia alticolens =

Scientific classification
- Kingdom: Animalia
- Phylum: Arthropoda
- Clade: Pancrustacea
- Class: Insecta
- Order: Lepidoptera
- Family: Gelechiidae
- Genus: Untomia
- Species: U. alticolens

Binomial name
- Untomia alticolens Walsingham, 1911

Species of moth

Untomia alticolens is a moth of the family Gelechiidae. It was described by Thomas de Grey, 6th Baron Walsingham in 1911. It is found in Mexico (Guerrero).

The wingspan is 12–14 mm. The forewings are pale fawn, shaded and blotched with dark chocolate-brown, the costa to one-third white, with a dark brown spot at the extreme base. Before the middle of the costa commences an elongate dark chocolate-brown patch which extends to the commencement of the costal cilia, before which it is interrupted by a short outwardly oblique white costal streak. The fawn-brown colour, spreading at the base over two-thirds of the wing-width, contains two dark suffused spots on the fold, the second followed by some whitish scales. There is a small dark spot on the cell before the middle, and a second somewhat obliquely placed at the end of the cell, the latter followed by a whitish space, the whole dorsal half of the wing being slightly sprinkled with dark scales. Before the apex a dark chocolate-brown spot precedes a margined line of the same colour along the base of the cilia which are whitish in the middle, tipped with chocolate-brown. The hindwings are pale grey, marked at the apex somewhat as in the forewings.
