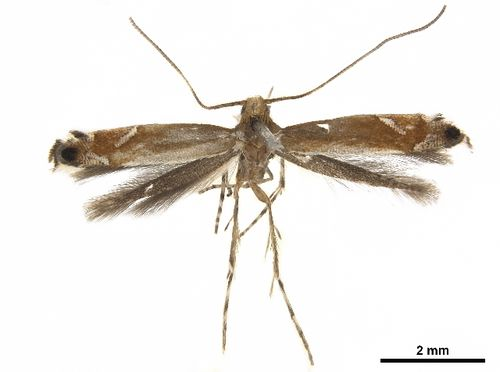

Scientific classification
- Kingdom: Animalia
- Phylum: Arthropoda
- Clade: Pancrustacea
- Class: Insecta
- Order: Lepidoptera
- Family: Gracillariidae
- Genus: Neurostrota
- Species: N. gunniella

Binomial name
- Neurostrota gunniella (Busck, 1906)

Synonyms
- Gracilaria gunniella Busck, 1906

= Neurostrota gunniella =

Species of moth

The mimosa stem-mining moth (Neurostrota gunniella) is a moth of the family Gracillariidae. It is known from Costa Rica, Cuba, Mexico and Texas, as well as Thailand and the Northern Territory in Australia, where it was introduced in 1989 to control Mimosa pigra.

The wingspan is about 8 mm.

The larvae feed on Mimosa asperata, Mimosa pigra, Neptunia oleracea and Neptunia plena. Mimosa pigra is the main larval host plant.
