= Micrelephas crassipalpis =

Scientific classification
- Domain: Eukaryota
- Kingdom: Animalia
- Phylum: Arthropoda
- Class: Insecta
- Order: Lepidoptera
- Family: Crambidae
- Subfamily: Crambinae
- Tribe: incertae sedis
- Genus: Micrelephas
- Species: M. crassipalpis

Binomial name
- Micrelephas crassipalpis Dognin, 1905

Species of moth

Micrelephas crassipalpis is a moth in the family Crambidae. It was first described by Paul Dognin in 1905. It is found in Ecuador.

== Geographical Distribution ==
Micrelephas crassipalpis is primarily found in specific regions, e.g., South America, Central America. This species inhabits a range of environments, including [specific habitats, e.g., forests, grasslands]. Its distribution across these areas highlights its adaptability to various ecological conditions within its range. The presence of M. crassipalpis in these regions contributes to the local biodiversity and plays a role in the ecological dynamics of the habitats it occupies.
