= Caloptilia dondavisi =

Scientific classification
- Kingdom: Animalia
- Phylum: Arthropoda
- Clade: Pancrustacea
- Class: Insecta
- Order: Lepidoptera
- Family: Gracillariidae
- Genus: Caloptilia
- Species: C. dondavisi

Binomial name
- Caloptilia dondavisi Landry, 2006

Species of moth

Caloptilia dondavisi is a moth species belonging to the family Gracillariidae. It was discovered in Galápagos Islands (Ecuador) and is limited to the islands and Brazil. It was first described by Bernard Landry in 2006, and is named for entomologist Donald R. Davis.

== Taxonomy and nomenclature ==
Caloptilia dondavisi belongs to the moth family Gracillariidae. The species is named for entomologist Donald R. Davis. The generic name Caloptilia is derived from Greek words "kalos" (καλός) meaning beautiful and "ptilon" (πτίλον) meaning feather or wing.

== Description ==
The males feature a greyish-brown head with purplish gloss, ochre-brown or yellow forewings with blackish-brown spots, with 3.2–3.9 mm (0.13–0.15 in) long forewings. The females are similar in colour, but with shorter forewings measuring 2.5–3.9 mm (0.098–0.154 in). The males have a shiny grey exoskeleton on the abdomen which is dirty white on the underside, and is equipped with specialized scent tufts and sclerotised structures on the hind parts. The male genitalia consists of a narrow and cylindrica phallus, with a series of short, and slightly curved cornuti. The females feature a triangular and laterally flattened papillae anales, with small and circular corpus bursae paired with claw-like and serrate signa. The larvae feed on Rhynchosia minima, and mine the leaves of their host plant.

== Distribution ==
The species was described from the Galapagos Islands in 2006, and is one of the ten species of the family Gracillariidae found in the islands. It has been found in the islands of Española, Fernandina, Genovesa, Isabela, Marchena, Pinta, Rábida, Santa Cruz, Santa Fé, and Santiago in the Galapagos. Its presence in Brazil was discovered in 2018. A specimen is preserved as part of the United States Government entomological collection.
