= Eupithecia galapagosata =

Scientific classification
- Kingdom: Animalia
- Phylum: Arthropoda
- Clade: Pancrustacea
- Class: Insecta
- Order: Lepidoptera
- Family: Geometridae
- Genus: Eupithecia
- Species: E. galapagosata

Binomial name
- Eupithecia galapagosata Landry & Rindge, 1995

Species of moth

Eupithecia galapagosata is a moth in the family Geometridae. It is found on the Galapagos Islands.
