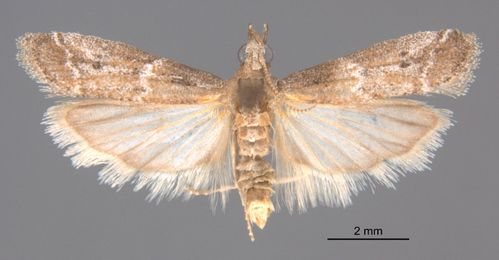

Scientific classification
- Domain: Eukaryota
- Kingdom: Animalia
- Phylum: Arthropoda
- Class: Insecta
- Order: Lepidoptera
- Family: Pyralidae
- Genus: Macrorrhinia
- Species: M. dryadella

Binomial name
- Macrorrhinia dryadella (Hulst, 1892)

Synonyms
- Ocala dryadella Hulst, 1892; Dolichorrhinia platanella Grossbeck, 1917

= Macrorrhinia dryadella =

Species of moth

Macrorrhinia dryadella is a species of snout moth in the genus Macrorrhinia. It was described by George Duryea Hulst in 1892 and is known from the US state of Florida.

The wingspan is 14–17 mm. The forewings are pale fuscous gray with an obscure white antemedial line. The hindwings are translucent, pale smoky white, with some dark streaking on the veins, especially in females.
