= Sparganothina anopla =

Scientific classification
- Kingdom: Animalia
- Phylum: Arthropoda
- Clade: Pancrustacea
- Class: Insecta
- Order: Lepidoptera
- Family: Tortricidae
- Genus: Sparganothina
- Species: S. anopla

Binomial name
- Sparganothina anopla Landry in Landry & Powell, 2001

Species of moth

Sparganothina anopla is a species of moth of the family Tortricidae. It was described by Bernard Landry in 2001. It is known from Veracruz, Mexico and from Honduras.

The forewing length is 5.5–7.1 mm (0.22–0.28 in) in males and 6.5–8 mm (0.26–0.31 in) in females.
