= Transeuplexia =

Scientific classification
- Kingdom: Animalia
- Phylum: Arthropoda
- Clade: Pancrustacea
- Class: Insecta
- Order: Lepidoptera
- Superfamily: Noctuoidea
- Family: Noctuidae
- Genus: Transeuplexia; Ronkay, Ronkay & Landry, 2020

Genus of moths

Transeuplexia is a genus of moths of the family Noctuidae.
