= Untomia melanobathra =

Scientific classification
- Kingdom: Animalia
- Phylum: Arthropoda
- Class: Insecta
- Order: Lepidoptera
- Family: Gelechiidae
- Genus: Untomia
- Species: U. melanobathra

Binomial name
- Untomia melanobathra Meyrick, 1918

Species of moth

Untomia melanobathra is a moth of the family Gelechiidae. It was described by Edward Meyrick in 1918. It is found in Ecuador.

The wingspan is 10–11 mm. The forewings are dark grey, suffusedly sprinkled or mixed with whitish, sometimes much suffused with whitish and sprinkled with black. The stigmata are represented by elongate black marks, the plical obliquely before the first discal, an additional mark in the disc towards the base. The costa is more or less black on the postmedian area. There is a fine very oblique whitish line from three-fourths of the costa to the termen above the middle. The apical area beyond this is suffused with light brownish and there is a black mark along the apical part of the costa and an indistinct blackish dash before the termen in the middle. The hindwings are grey, in males suffused blackish towards the base.
