= Neurostrota cupreella =

Scientific classification
- Domain: Eukaryota
- Kingdom: Animalia
- Phylum: Arthropoda
- Class: Insecta
- Order: Lepidoptera
- Family: Gracillariidae
- Genus: Neurostrota
- Species: N. cupreella

Binomial name
- Neurostrota cupreella (Walsingham, 1897)

Synonyms
- Eucosmophora cupreella Walsingham, 1897

Species of moth

Neurostrota cupreella is a moth of the family Gracillariidae. It is known from Jamaica and Cuba.
