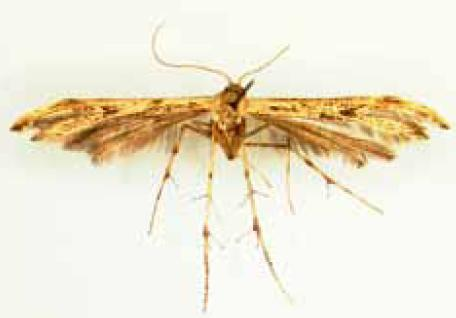

Scientific classification
- Kingdom: Animalia
- Phylum: Arthropoda
- Clade: Pancrustacea
- Class: Insecta
- Order: Lepidoptera
- Family: Pterophoridae
- Genus: Hellinsia
- Species: H. devriesi

Binomial name
- Hellinsia devriesi (B. Landry & Gielis, 1992)

Synonyms
- Oidaematophorus devriesi B. Landry & Gielis, 1992

= Hellinsia devriesi =

Species of plume moth

Hellinsia devriesi is a moth of the family Pterophoridae. It is found on the Galapagos Islands and Guadeloupe.

The wingspan is 17–18 millimetres (0.67–0.71 in). Adults have been recorded in November and December.

The larvae feed on Ipomoea setifera, Ipomoea tiliacea and Merremia umbellata.

== Etymology ==
This species is named after Professor T.J. de Vries of the Pontifícia Universidad Católica del Ecuador in Quito, who collected the type series.
