= Untomia albistrigella =

Scientific classification
- Kingdom: Animalia
- Phylum: Arthropoda
- Clade: Pancrustacea
- Class: Insecta
- Order: Lepidoptera
- Family: Gelechiidae
- Genus: Untomia
- Species: U. albistrigella

Binomial name
- Untomia albistrigella (Chambers, 1872)

Synonyms
- Gelechia albistrigella Chambers, 1872

Species of moth

Untomia albistrigella is a moth of the family Gelechiidae. It was described by Vactor Tousey Chambers in 1872. It is found in North America, where it has been recorded from Alabama, Arkansas, Florida, Georgia, Illinois, Indiana, Kentucky, Louisiana, Maryland, Mississippi, North Carolina, Ohio, Oklahoma, Ontario, Pennsylvania, South Carolina, Tennessee, Texas and West Virginia.

Adults are dark brown in some lights, faintly tinged with purple, green or bronze. There is a small oblique white costal streak just before, and a few indistinct whitish scales or small spots in the apex, near the dorsal cilia. The cilia are pale fuscous, with a dark brown hindmarginal line before their middle.
