= Micrelephas longicilia =

Scientific classification
- Kingdom: Animalia
- Phylum: Arthropoda
- Clade: Pancrustacea
- Class: Insecta
- Order: Lepidoptera
- Family: Crambidae
- Subfamily: Crambinae
- Tribe: incertae sedis
- Genus: Micrelephas
- Species: M. longocilia

Binomial name
- Micrelephas longocilia Landry & Becker in Landry, Becker & Mally, 2013

Species of moth

Micrelephas longicilia is a moth in the family Crambidae. It was described by Bernard Landry and Vitor Osmar Becker in 2013. It is found in Bahia, Brazil.
