= Micrelephas chalybeus =

Scientific classification
- Kingdom: Animalia
- Phylum: Arthropoda
- Clade: Pancrustacea
- Class: Insecta
- Order: Lepidoptera
- Family: Crambidae
- Subfamily: Crambinae
- Tribe: incertae sedis
- Genus: Micrelephas
- Species: M. chalybeus

Binomial name
- Micrelephas chalybeus B. Landry, 2003

Species of moth

Micrelephas chalybeus is a moth in the family Crambidae. It was described by Bernard Landry in 2003. It is found in Costa Rica.
