= Macrorrhinia =

Scientific classification
- Domain: Eukaryota
- Kingdom: Animalia
- Phylum: Arthropoda
- Class: Insecta
- Order: Lepidoptera
- Family: Pyralidae
- Subfamily: Phycitinae
- Genus: Macrorrhinia; Barnes & McDunnough, 1913

Synonyms
- Divitiaca Barnes & McDunnough, 1913; Dolichorrhinia Ragonot, 1888; Ocala Hulst, 1892; Ocala Hulst, 1891

Genus of moths

Macrorrhinia is a genus of snout moths. It was described by William Barnes and James Halliday McDunnough in 1913.

== Species ==
- Macrorrhinia aureofasciella Ragonot, 1887
- Macrorrhinia dryadella (Hulst, 1892)
- Macrorrhinia endonephele (Hampson, 1918)
- Macrorrhinia ochrella (Barnes & McDunnough, 1913)
- Macrorrhinia parvulella (Barnes & McDunnough, 1913)
- Macrorrhinia pinta Landry & Neunzig, 1998
