= Sparganothina laselvana =

Scientific classification
- Kingdom: Animalia
- Phylum: Arthropoda
- Clade: Pancrustacea
- Class: Insecta
- Order: Lepidoptera
- Family: Tortricidae
- Genus: Sparganothina
- Species: S. laselvana

Binomial name
- Sparganothina laselvana Landry, in Landry & Powell, 2001

Species of moth

Sparganothina laselvana is a species of moth of the family Tortricidae. It is found in Costa Rica.

The length of the forewings is 5-5.7 mm for males and 5.5-6.6 mm for females.
