= Sparganothina xanthozodion =

Scientific classification
- Kingdom: Animalia
- Phylum: Arthropoda
- Clade: Pancrustacea
- Class: Insecta
- Order: Lepidoptera
- Family: Tortricidae
- Genus: Sparganothina
- Species: S. xanthozodion

Binomial name
- Sparganothina xanthozodion Razowski & Wojtusiak, 2010

Species of moth

Sparganothina xanthozodion is a species of moth of the family Tortricidae. It is known from the Yanachaga–Chemillén National Park in the Pasco Region, Peru. The holotype was collected at 1,050 m (3,440 ft) above sea level.

The wingspan is about 14 mm for the holotype, a male.
