= Caloptilia cruzorum =

Scientific classification
- Kingdom: Animalia
- Phylum: Arthropoda
- Clade: Pancrustacea
- Class: Insecta
- Order: Lepidoptera
- Family: Gracillariidae
- Genus: Caloptilia
- Species: C. cruzorum

Binomial name
- Caloptilia cruzorum Landry, 2006

Species of moth

Caloptilia cruzorum is a moth of the family Gracillariidae. It is known from the Galápagos Islands (Ecuador) and from Brazil. It is named for Eliecer and Emma Cruz-Bedon for their "unwavering involvement in Galapagos conservation".

The forewing length is about 3.9–4.6 mm (0.15–0.18 in) for males and 4.4–4.8 mm (0.17–0.19 in) for females. The larvae feed on Galactia species, probably Galactia striata. They mine the leaves of their host plant.
