= Almita =

Scientific classification
- Kingdom: Animalia
- Phylum: Arthropoda
- Clade: Pancrustacea
- Class: Insecta
- Order: Lepidoptera
- Family: Crambidae
- Tribe: Crambini
- Genus: Almita; B. Landry, 1995

Type species
- Almita texana B. Landry, 1995

Genus of moths

Almita is a genus of moths of the family Crambidae.

== Species ==
- Almita portalia B. Landry, 1995
- Almita texana B. Landry, 1995
