= Untomia latistriga =

Scientific classification
- Domain: Eukaryota
- Kingdom: Animalia
- Phylum: Arthropoda
- Class: Insecta
- Order: Lepidoptera
- Family: Gelechiidae
- Genus: Untomia
- Species: U. latistriga

Binomial name
- Untomia latistriga Walsingham, 1911

Species of moth

Untomia latistriga is a moth of the family Gelechiidae. It was described by Thomas de Grey, 6th Baron Walsingham, in 1911. It is found in Mexico (Morelos).

The wingspan is about 12 mm. The forewings are whitish ochreous, a black spot at the base of the costa, produced in a narrow line along the costa to beyond one-third, where it is dilated into a broad patch shaded with brown along its lower edge, and continued to the commencement of the costal cilia. Here is a rather widened, obliquely outward-curved, white costal streak, separated by a narrow brown space from a smaller, oblique, straight white streak preceding the semicircular black line which follows the margin of the evenly rounded apex and termen through the base of the whitish ochreous cilia, which are tipped with greyish fuscous. There is a slight brownish fuscous suffusion along the dorsal half of the wing, and this is speckled with darker fuscous, notably in a narrow spot before the middle of the fold and in a short oblique patch arising from the flexus. The hindwings are shining leaden grey.
