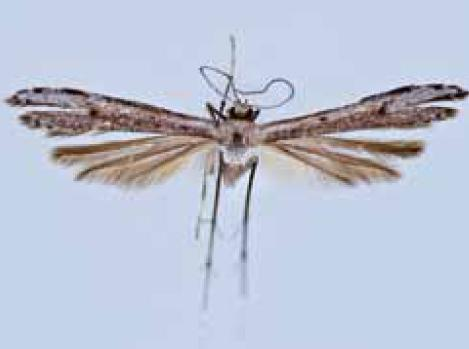

Scientific classification
- Kingdom: Animalia
- Phylum: Arthropoda
- Clade: Pancrustacea
- Class: Insecta
- Order: Lepidoptera
- Family: Pterophoridae
- Genus: Hellinsia
- Species: H. cristobalis

Binomial name
- Hellinsia cristobalis (B. Landry & Gielis, 1992)

Synonyms
- Oidaematophorus cristobalis B. Landry & Gielis, 1992

= Hellinsia cristobalis =

Species of plume moth

Hellinsia cristobalis is a moth of the family Pterophoridae. It is found on the Galapagos Islands.

The wingspan is 13–16 millimetres (0.51–0.63 in).

Adults have been recorded in February, November and possibly December.
