= Sparganothina hermosa =

Scientific classification
- Kingdom: Animalia
- Phylum: Arthropoda
- Clade: Pancrustacea
- Class: Insecta
- Order: Lepidoptera
- Family: Tortricidae
- Genus: Sparganothina
- Species: S. hermosa

Binomial name
- Sparganothina hermosa Razowski & Wojtusiak, 2010

Species of moth

Sparganothina hermosa is a species of moth of the family Tortricidae. It is found in Napo Province, Ecuador.

The wingspan is about 30 mm.
