= Bucculatrix caribbea =

Scientific classification
- Kingdom: Animalia
- Phylum: Arthropoda
- Clade: Pancrustacea
- Class: Insecta
- Order: Lepidoptera
- Family: Bucculatricidae
- Genus: Bucculatrix
- Species: B. caribbea

Binomial name
- Bucculatrix caribbea Davis & Landry, 2002

Species of moth

Bucculatrix caribbea is a moth species in the family Bucculatricidae. It was described in 2002 by Donald R. Davis and Bernard Landry. It is found on the island of Cozumel (Mexico) and Glovers Reef in Belize, but it is probably widespread along coastal areas in many parts of the Caribbean region.

The length of the forewings is 2–2.3 mm. The larvae feed on Cordia sebestena. They mine the leaves of their host plant.
