= Galagete krameri =

Scientific classification
- Kingdom: Animalia
- Phylum: Arthropoda
- Clade: Pancrustacea
- Class: Insecta
- Order: Lepidoptera
- Family: Autostichidae
- Genus: Galagete
- Species: G. krameri

Binomial name
- Galagete krameri Landry & Schmitz, 2008

Species of moth

Galagete krameri is a moth in the family Autostichidae. It was described by Bernard Landry and Patrick Schmitz in 2008. It is found on the Galápagos Islands.

The wingspan is 7.8-9.5 mm. The forewings are brown with cream coloured lines. The hindwings are grey. Adults have been recorded on wing in February and March.

== Etymology ==
The species is named for Dr. Peter Kramer, president of the Charles Darwin Foundation for the Galápagos.
