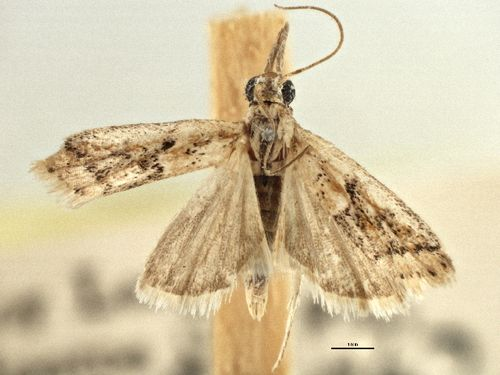

Scientific classification
- Domain: Eukaryota
- Kingdom: Animalia
- Phylum: Arthropoda
- Class: Insecta
- Order: Lepidoptera
- Family: Pyralidae
- Genus: Macrorrhinia
- Species: M. parvulella

Binomial name
- Macrorrhinia parvulella (Barnes & McDunnough, 1913)

Synonyms
- Divitiaca parvulella Barnes & McDunnough, 1913; Divitiaca consociata Heinrich, 1956

= Macrorrhinia parvulella =

Species of moth

Macrorrhinia parvulella is a species of snout moth in the genus Macrorrhinia. It was described by William Barnes and James Halliday McDunnough in 1913 and is known from the US states of Florida and South Carolina. It is also found in Colombia.

The wingspan is 9–12 mm. There are dark markings on the forewings, as well as a rather broad whitish band along the costa. The hindwings are pale to dark smoky fuscous.

The larvae feed on Achyranthus ramosissima.
