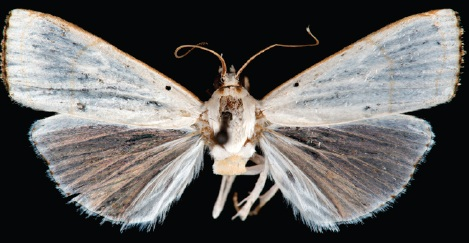

Scientific classification
- Kingdom: Animalia
- Phylum: Arthropoda
- Clade: Pancrustacea
- Class: Insecta
- Order: Lepidoptera
- Family: Crambidae
- Genus: Catharylla
- Species: C. gigantea

Binomial name
- Catharylla gigantea T. Léger & B. Landry, 2014

= Catharylla gigantea =

Species of moth

Catharylla gigantea is a moth of the family Crambidae described by Théo Léger and Bernard Landry in 2014. It is found in French Guiana, Guyana and the Brazilian state of Amazonas.

The length of the forewings is 13.5–14.5 mm for males and 17.5–22 mm for females. The forewings are snow white with a wide brown to dark brown costal line from the base to the apex. The median and subterminal transverse lines are faded brown. There are dark brown spots on the termen, forming a more or less continuous line. The hindwings are snow white with dark brown marginal spots.

== Etymology ==
The species name is derived from Latin giganteus (meaning very large).
