= Untomia acicularis =

Scientific classification
- Kingdom: Animalia
- Phylum: Arthropoda
- Class: Insecta
- Order: Lepidoptera
- Family: Gelechiidae
- Genus: Untomia
- Species: U. acicularis

Binomial name
- Untomia acicularis Meyrick, 1918

Species of moth

Untomia acicularis is a moth of the family Gelechiidae. It was described by Edward Meyrick in 1918. It is found in Ecuador.

The wingspan is 8–9 mm. The forewings are dark fuscous, more or less sprinkled with whitish. The stigmata are cloudy and blackish, the plical obliquely before the first discal. There is a rather short fine oblique white striga from the costa at three-fourths and a black marginal line around the apex and termen. The hindwings are grey.
