= Untomia untomiella =

Scientific classification
- Domain: Eukaryota
- Kingdom: Animalia
- Phylum: Arthropoda
- Class: Insecta
- Order: Lepidoptera
- Family: Gelechiidae
- Genus: Untomia
- Species: U. untomiella

Binomial name
- Untomia untomiella Busck, 1906

Species of moth

Untomia untomiella is a moth of the family Gelechiidae. It was described by August Busck in 1906. It is found in North America, where it has been recorded from Texas.

The wingspan is 8–9 mm. The forewings are dark fuscous, irregularly and sparsely sprinkled with ochreous and blackish scales. There is a longitudinal black dot on the middle of the cell, and another more prominent black dot at the end of the cell. At the beginning of the dorsal cilia is an outwardly directed oblique narrow white streak, nearly parallel with the edge of the wing and reaching nearly to apex where it is met by a similar costal white streak. Both of these are often more or less incomplete and faint and the small size of the species makes the ornamentation obscure.
