= Sparganothina decagramma =

Scientific classification
- Kingdom: Animalia
- Phylum: Arthropoda
- Clade: Pancrustacea
- Class: Insecta
- Order: Lepidoptera
- Family: Tortricidae
- Genus: Sparganothina
- Species: S. decagramma

Binomial name
- Sparganothina decagramma (Meyrick, 1932)

Synonyms
- Philedone decagramma Meyrick, 1932

Species of moth

Sparganothina decagramma is a species of moth of the family Tortricidae. It is found in Santa Catarina, Brazil.
