= Sparganothina flava =

Scientific classification
- Kingdom: Animalia
- Phylum: Arthropoda
- Clade: Pancrustacea
- Class: Insecta
- Order: Lepidoptera
- Family: Tortricidae
- Genus: Sparganothina
- Species: S. flava

Binomial name
- Sparganothina flava Razowski & Wojtusiak, 2006

Species of moth

Sparganothina flava is a species of moth of the family Tortricidae. It is known from Morona-Santiago Province, Ecuador. The holotype was obtained at 2,450 m (8,040 ft) above sea level.

The wingspan of the holotype, a male, is 17.5 millimetres (0.69 in).

== Etymology ==
The specific name flava is from Latin (meaning yellow) and refers to the background colour of the forewings.
