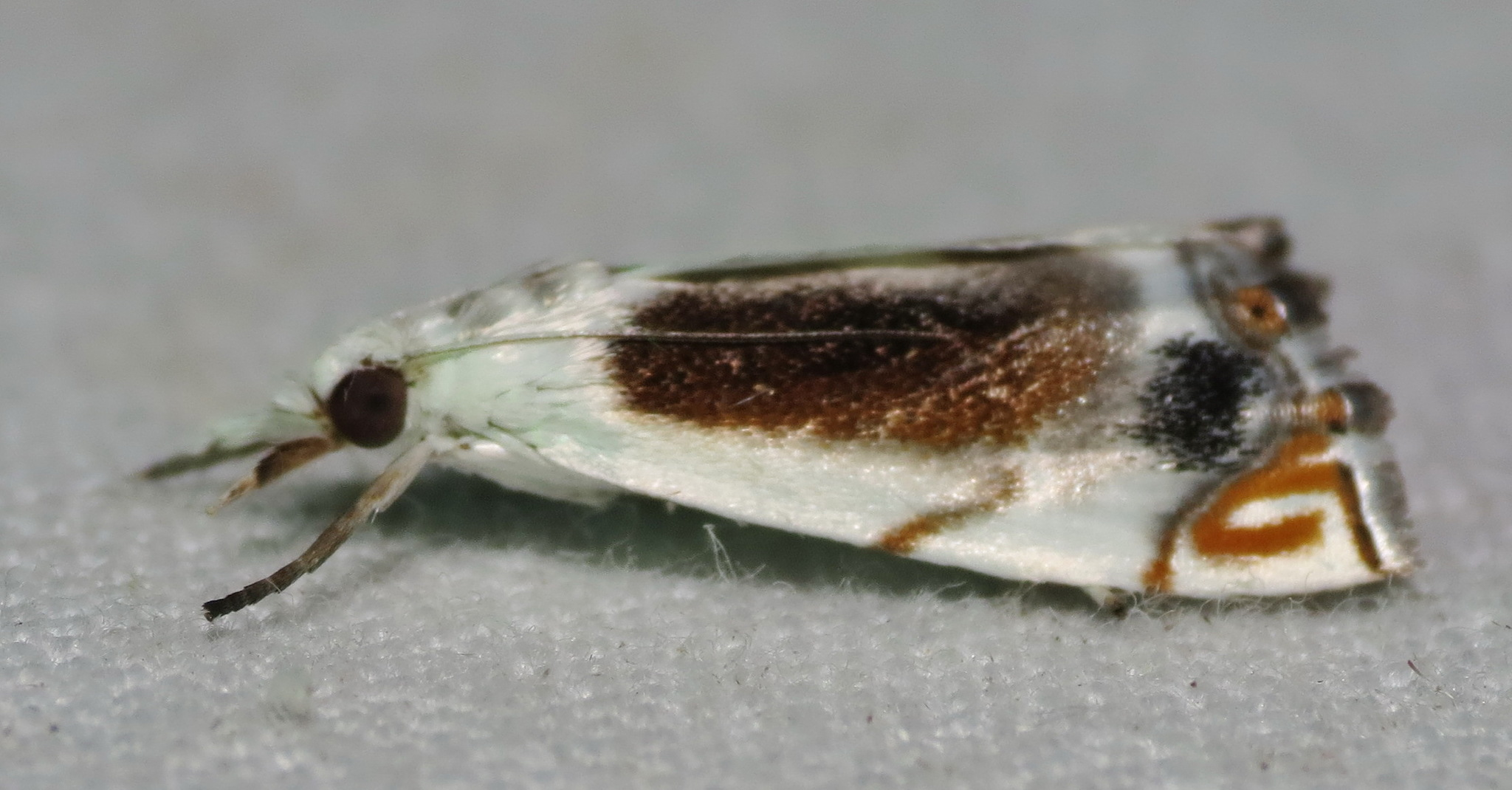

Scientific classification
- Kingdom: Animalia
- Phylum: Arthropoda
- Clade: Pancrustacea
- Class: Insecta
- Order: Lepidoptera
- Family: Crambidae
- Subfamily: Crambinae
- Tribe: incertae sedis
- Genus: Micrelephas
- Species: M. helenae

Binomial name
- Micrelephas helenae B. Landry, 2003

= Micrelephas helenae =

Species of moth

Micrelephas helenae is a species of moth in the family Crambidae. It was first described by Bernard Landry in 2003. It is found in Costa Rica.
