= Neurostrota brunnea =

Scientific classification
- Kingdom: Animalia
- Phylum: Arthropoda
- Clade: Pancrustacea
- Class: Insecta
- Order: Lepidoptera
- Family: Gracillariidae
- Genus: Neurostrota
- Species: N. brunnea

Binomial name
- Neurostrota brunnea Landry, 2006

Species of moth

Neurostrota brunnea is a moth of the family Gracillariidae. It is known from the Galápagos Islands.

The larvae probably feed on a Coffea species. They probably mine the leaves of their host plant.
