= Galagete protozona =

Scientific classification
- Kingdom: Animalia
- Phylum: Arthropoda
- Class: Insecta
- Order: Lepidoptera
- Family: Autostichidae
- Genus: Galagete
- Species: G. protozona

Binomial name
- Galagete protozona (Meyrick, 1926)

Synonyms
- Gelechia protozona Meyrick, 1926

Species of moth

Galagete protozona is a moth in the family Autostichidae. It was described by Edward Meyrick in 1926. It is found on the Galápagos Islands.
