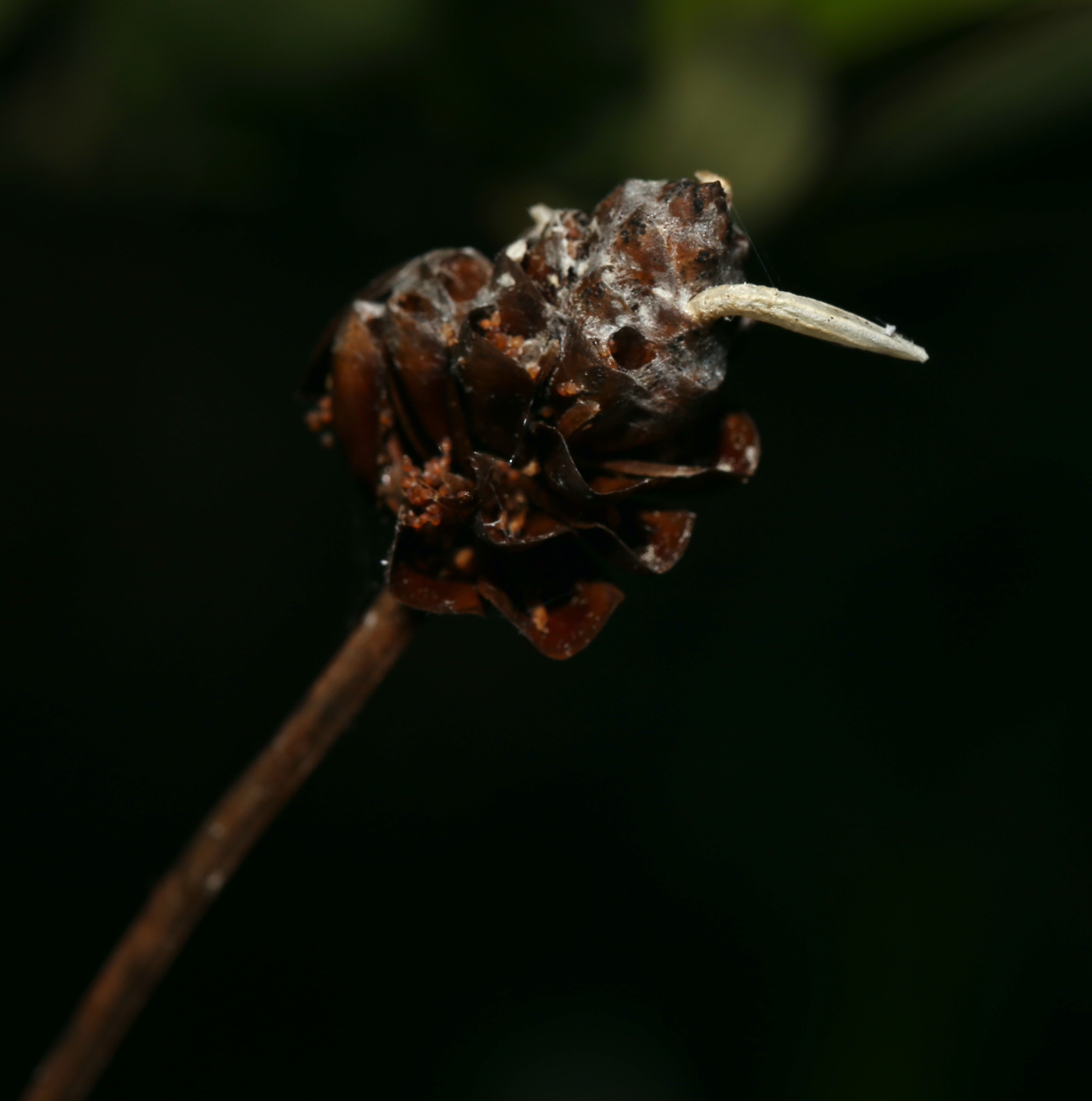
- Larval case on Xyris

Scientific classification
- Kingdom: Animalia
- Phylum: Arthropoda
- Clade: Pancrustacea
- Class: Insecta
- Order: Lepidoptera
- Family: Coleophoridae
- Genus: Coleophora
- Species: C. xyridella

Binomial name
- Coleophora xyridella Landry, 2005

= Coleophora xyridella =

Species of moth

Coleophora xyridella is a moth of the family Coleophoridae. It is found in the United States, including Louisiana, Mississippi, Florida, South Carolina and Georgia.

The larvae feed on the seed heads of Xyris species.
