= Galagete griseonana =

Scientific classification
- Kingdom: Animalia
- Phylum: Arthropoda
- Clade: Pancrustacea
- Class: Insecta
- Order: Lepidoptera
- Family: Autostichidae
- Genus: Galagete
- Species: G. griseonana

Binomial name
- Galagete griseonana Schmitz & Landry, 2005

Species of moth

Galagete griseonana is a moth in the family Autostichidae. It was described by Schmitz and Landry in 2005. It is found on the Galapagos Islands.
