= Micrelephas pictella =

Scientific classification
- Domain: Eukaryota
- Kingdom: Animalia
- Phylum: Arthropoda
- Class: Insecta
- Order: Lepidoptera
- Family: Crambidae
- Subfamily: Crambinae
- Tribe: incertae sedis
- Genus: Micrelephas
- Species: M. pictella

Binomial name
- Micrelephas pictella (Schaus, 1922)

Synonyms
- Diptychophora pictella Schaus, 1922; Diptychophora examinalis Meyrick, 1931

Species of moth

Micrelephas pictella is a moth in the family Crambidae. It was described by Schaus in 1922. It is found in Brazil and Guyana.
