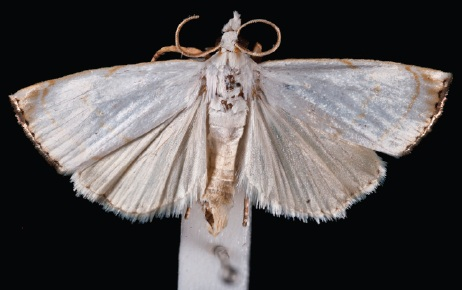

Scientific classification
- Kingdom: Animalia
- Phylum: Arthropoda
- Clade: Pancrustacea
- Class: Insecta
- Order: Lepidoptera
- Family: Crambidae
- Genus: Catharylla
- Species: C. coronata

Binomial name
- Catharylla coronata T. Léger & B. Landry, 2014

= Catharylla coronata =

Species of moth

Catharylla coronata is a moth of the family Crambidae described by Théo Léger and Bernard Landry in 2014. It is found in Brazil (Bahia, Espirito Santo, Paranà, Rio de Janeiro, Santa Catarina, and São Paulo).

The length of the forewings is 10–13 mm for males and 14–16 mm for females. The costal margin of the forewings is light ochreous. The median transverse line is light ochreous. The subterminal transverse line is ochreous. The hindwings are white to creamy white, usually with marginal brown spots.

== Etymology ==
The species name refers to the longitudinal string of short spines of the transtilla in the male genitalia and is derived from Latin coronatus (meaning crowned).
