= Sparganothina cultrata =

Scientific classification
- Kingdom: Animalia
- Phylum: Arthropoda
- Clade: Pancrustacea
- Class: Insecta
- Order: Lepidoptera
- Family: Tortricidae
- Genus: Sparganothina
- Species: S. cultrata

Binomial name
- Sparganothina cultrata Landry, in Landry & Powell, 2001

Species of moth

Sparganothina cultrata is a species of moth of the family Tortricidae. It is found in Sinaloa, Mexico.

The length of the forewings is 7.8-8.3 mm for males and 8-8.8 mm for females.
