= Sparganothina inbiana =

Scientific classification
- Kingdom: Animalia
- Phylum: Arthropoda
- Clade: Pancrustacea
- Class: Insecta
- Order: Lepidoptera
- Family: Tortricidae
- Genus: Sparganothina
- Species: S. inbiana

Binomial name
- Sparganothina inbiana Landry, in Landry & Powell, 2001

Species of moth

Sparganothina inbiana is a species of moth of the family Tortricidae. It is found in Costa Rica.

The length of the forewings is 8.5–9 mm for males and 9.4–10 mm for females.

== Etymology ==
The species name refers to the Instituto Nacional de Biodiversidad.
