= Galagete =

Scientific classification
- Kingdom: Animalia
- Phylum: Arthropoda
- Clade: Pancrustacea
- Class: Insecta
- Order: Lepidoptera
- Family: Autostichidae
- Subfamily: Autostichinae
- Genus: Galagete; Landry, 2002

Genus of moths

Galagete is a moth genus in the subfamily Autostichinae.

== Species ==
- Galagete cinerea Landry, 2002
- Galagete consimilis Landry, 2002
- Galagete cristobalensis Landry, 2002
- Galagete darwini Landry, 2002
- Galagete espanolaensis Landry, 2002
- Galagete gnathodoxa (Meyrick, 1926)
- Galagete griseonana Schmitz & Landry, 2005
- Galagete krameri Landry & Schmitz, 2008
- Galagete levequei Landry, 2002
- Galagete pecki Landry, 2002
- Galagete protozona (Meyrick, 1926)
- Galagete seymourensis Landry, 2002
- Galagete turritella Landry, 2002
