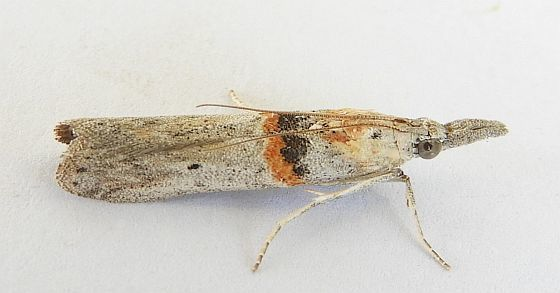

Scientific classification
- Domain: Eukaryota
- Kingdom: Animalia
- Phylum: Arthropoda
- Class: Insecta
- Order: Lepidoptera
- Family: Pyralidae
- Genus: Macrorrhinia
- Species: M. aureofasciella

Binomial name
- Macrorrhinia aureofasciella Ragonot, 1887

Synonyms
- Dolichorrhinia aureofasciella

= Macrorrhinia aureofasciella =

Species of moth

Macrorrhinia aureofasciella is a species of snout moth in the genus Macrorrhinia. It was described by Émile Louis Ragonot in 1887 and is known from the US states of Arizona and Texas.

The wingspan is 13–22 mm. The forewings are ocherous gray. The hindwings are translucent, whitish with a pale smoky tint.
