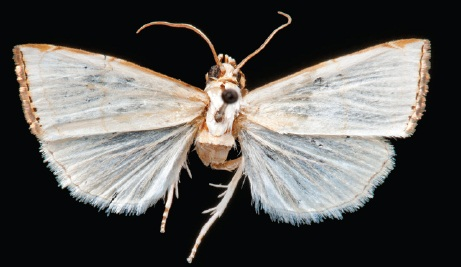

Scientific classification
- Kingdom: Animalia
- Phylum: Arthropoda
- Clade: Pancrustacea
- Class: Insecta
- Order: Lepidoptera
- Family: Crambidae
- Genus: Catharylla
- Species: C. bijuga

Binomial name
- Catharylla bijuga T. Léger & B. Landry, 2014

= Catharylla bijuga =

Species of moth

Catharylla bijuga is a moth of the family Crambidae described by Théo Léger and Bernard Landry in 2014. It occurs in lowlands of the Guianas (Guyana, Suriname, and French Guiana) and Brazil.

== Etymology ==
The species name refers to the bifid costal arm of the male genitalia and is derived from Latin bijugus (meaning yoked together, double).

== Description ==
The length of the forewings is 9–10.5 mm for males and 11–15 mm for females. The forewings are snow white, with a yellow-ochreous to brown costal margin, partially disrupted when meeting the transverse lines. The hindwings are snow white, the veins slightly ochreous.

On the forewing, the seven thin marginal dark brown dashes, with the most tornal two shaped like spots, will separate this species from the others. In male genitalia, the strongly sclerotized double costal arm of the valva with the ventral arm tubular is a distinctive character. In female genitalia, the best diagnostic character is the sclerotized projection latero-ventrally on sternite VIII.

== Distribution ==
The species occurs in lowlands of the Guianas and Brazil.

== Ecology ==
Males use the tip of the tubular costal arm of the male genitalia to hook the lateral projections of sternite VIII in the female genitalia during mating.
