= Sparganothina neoamoebaea =

Scientific classification
- Kingdom: Animalia
- Phylum: Arthropoda
- Clade: Pancrustacea
- Class: Insecta
- Order: Lepidoptera
- Family: Tortricidae
- Genus: Sparganothina
- Species: S. neoamoebaea

Binomial name
- Sparganothina neoamoebaea Landry, in Landry & Powell, 2001

Species of moth

Sparganothina neoamoebaea is a species of moth of the family Tortricidae. It is found in Jalisco, Mexico.

The length of the forewings is 5.8-6.3 mm for males and 6.5-7.3 mm for females.
