= Caloptilia galacotra =

Scientific classification
- Kingdom: Animalia
- Phylum: Arthropoda
- Clade: Pancrustacea
- Class: Insecta
- Order: Lepidoptera
- Family: Gracillariidae
- Genus: Caloptilia
- Species: C. galacotra

Binomial name
- Caloptilia galacotra Landry, 2006

Species of moth

Caloptilia galacotra is a moth of the family Gracillariidae. It is known from the Galápagos Islands (Ecuador). It is named for the Galapagos Conservation Trust.

The forewing length is about 2.7–4.5 mm (0.11–0.18 in) for males and 3.1–4.4 mm (0.12–0.17 in) for females.
