= Sparganothina amoebaea =

Scientific classification
- Kingdom: Animalia
- Phylum: Arthropoda
- Clade: Pancrustacea
- Class: Insecta
- Order: Lepidoptera
- Family: Tortricidae
- Genus: Sparganothina
- Species: S. amoebaea

Binomial name
- Sparganothina amoebaea (Walsingham, 1913)

Synonyms
- Sparganothis amoebaea Walsingham, 1913

Species of moth

Sparganothina amoebaea is a species of moth of the family Tortricidae. It is found in Guerrero, Mexico.

The length of the forewings is about 6.8 mm.
