= Sparganothina costaricana =

Scientific classification
- Kingdom: Animalia
- Phylum: Arthropoda
- Clade: Pancrustacea
- Class: Insecta
- Order: Lepidoptera
- Family: Tortricidae
- Genus: Sparganothina
- Species: S. costaricana

Binomial name
- Sparganothina costaricana Landry, in Landry & Powell, 2001

Species of moth

Sparganothina costaricana is a species of moth of the family Tortricidae. It is found in Costa Rica.

The length of the forewings is about 7.1 mm.

== Etymology ==
The species name refers to Costa Rica, where the holotype was collected.
