= Macrorrhinia ochrella =

Scientific classification
- Domain: Eukaryota
- Kingdom: Animalia
- Phylum: Arthropoda
- Class: Insecta
- Order: Lepidoptera
- Family: Pyralidae
- Genus: Macrorrhinia
- Species: M. ochrella

Binomial name
- Macrorrhinia ochrella (Barnes & McDunnough, 1913)

Synonyms
- Divitaca ochrella Barnes & McDunnough, 1913; Divitiaca ochrella; Divitaca simulella Barnes & McDunnough, 1913; Divitiaca simulella; Macrorrhinia simulella

Species of moth

Macrorrhinia ochrella is a species of snout moth described by William Barnes and James Halliday McDunnough in 1913. It is found in the US state of Florida.

The wingspan is 12–17 mm. The forewings are pale ocherous. The hindwings are semihyaline and whitish.
