= Sparganothina xanthista =

Scientific classification
- Kingdom: Animalia
- Phylum: Arthropoda
- Clade: Pancrustacea
- Class: Insecta
- Order: Lepidoptera
- Family: Tortricidae
- Genus: Sparganothina
- Species: S. xanthista

Binomial name
- Sparganothina xanthista (Walsingham, 1913)

Synonyms
- Sparganothis xanthista Walsingham, 1913

Species of moth

Sparganothina xanthista is a species of moth of the family Tortricidae. It is found in Guerrero, Mexico.

The length of the forewings is 7.8-9.1 mm for males and 9.3 mm for females.
