= Untomia formularis =

Scientific classification
- Domain: Eukaryota
- Kingdom: Animalia
- Phylum: Arthropoda
- Class: Insecta
- Order: Lepidoptera
- Family: Gelechiidae
- Genus: Untomia
- Species: U. formularis

Binomial name
- Untomia formularis Meyrick, 1929

Species of moth

Untomia formularis is a moth of the family Gelechiidae. It was described by Edward Meyrick in 1929. It is found in Colombia and Amazonas, Brazil.
