= Neurostrota magnifica =

Scientific classification
- Kingdom: Animalia
- Phylum: Arthropoda
- Clade: Pancrustacea
- Class: Insecta
- Order: Lepidoptera
- Family: Gracillariidae
- Genus: Neurostrota
- Species: N. magnifica

Binomial name
- Neurostrota magnifica Landry, 2006

Species of moth

Neurostrota magnifica is a moth of the family Gracillariidae. It is known from the Galápagos Islands.
