= Almita texana =

Scientific classification
- Kingdom: Animalia
- Phylum: Arthropoda
- Clade: Pancrustacea
- Class: Insecta
- Order: Lepidoptera
- Family: Crambidae
- Genus: Almita
- Species: A. texana

Binomial name
- Almita texana B. Landry, 1995

Species of moth

Almita texana is a moth in the family Crambidae. It was described by Bernard Landry in 1995. It is found in North America, where it has been recorded from Texas.
