= Sparganothina =

Scientific classification
- Kingdom: Animalia
- Phylum: Arthropoda
- Clade: Pancrustacea
- Class: Insecta
- Order: Lepidoptera
- Family: Tortricidae
- Tribe: Sparganothini
- Genus: Sparganothina; Powell, 1986

Genus of tortrix moths

Sparganothina is a genus of moths of the family Tortricidae.

== Species ==
- Sparganothina alta Landry, in Landry & Powell, 2001
- Sparganothina amoebaea Walsingham, 1913
- Sparganothina anopla Landry, in Landry & Powell, 2001
- Sparganothina aurozodion Razowski & Wojtusiak, 2010
- Sparganothina beckeri Landry, in Landry & Powell, 2001
- Sparganothina cristata Landry, in Landry & Powell, 2001
- Sparganothina cultrata Landry, in Landry & Powell, 2001
- Sparganothina flava Razowski & Wojtusiak, 2006
- Sparganothina hermosa Razowski & Wojtusiak, 2010
- Sparganothina irregularis Landry, in Landry & Powell, 2001
- Sparganothina lutea Landry, in Landry & Powell, 2001
- Sparganothina nana Landry, in Landry & Powell, 2001
- Sparganothina neoamoebaea Landry, in Landry & Powell, 2001
- Sparganothina pollicis Landry, in Landry & Powell, 2001
- Sparganothina refugiana Razowski & Wojtusiak, 2010
- Sparganothina setosa Landry, in Landry & Powell, 2001
- Sparganothina spinulosa Landry, in Landry & Powell, 2001
- Sparganothina tena Landry, in Landry & Powell, 2001
- Sparganothina ternaria Landry, in Landry & Powell, 2001
- Sparganothina trispinosa Landry, in Landry & Powell, 2001
- Sparganothina veracruzana Landry, in Landry & Powell, 2001
- Sparganothina volcanica Landry, in Landry & Powell, 2001
- Sparganothina xanthista Walsingham, 1913
- Sparganothina xanthozodion Razowski & Wojtusiak, 2010

== Placement uncertain ==
- Sparganothina aureola Landry, in Landry & Powell, 2001
- Sparganothina browni Landry, in Landry & Powell, 2001
- Sparganothina costaricana Landry, in Landry & Powell, 2001
- Sparganothina covelli Landry, in Landry & Powell, 2001
- Sparganothina decagramma (Meyrick, 1932)
- Sparganothina flammea Landry, in Landry & Powell, 2001
- Sparganothina inbiana Landry, in Landry & Powell, 2001
- Sparganothina laselvana Landry, in Landry & Powell, 2001
- Sparganothina nephela (Walsingham, 1913)
- Sparganothina venezolana Landry, in Landry & Powell, 2001

== See also ==
- List of Tortricidae genera
