= Galagete gnathodoxa =

Scientific classification
- Kingdom: Animalia
- Phylum: Arthropoda
- Class: Insecta
- Order: Lepidoptera
- Family: Autostichidae
- Genus: Galagete
- Species: G. gnathodoxa

Binomial name
- Galagete gnathodoxa (Meyrick, 1926)

Synonyms
- Gelechia gnathodoxa Meyrick, 1926

Species of moth

Galagete gnathodoxa is a moth in the family Autostichidae. It was described by Edward Meyrick in 1926. It is found on the Galápagos Islands.
