= Galagete seymourensis =

Scientific classification
- Kingdom: Animalia
- Phylum: Arthropoda
- Clade: Pancrustacea
- Class: Insecta
- Order: Lepidoptera
- Family: Autostichidae
- Genus: Galagete
- Species: G. seymourensis

Binomial name
- Galagete seymourensis Landry, 2002

Species of moth

Galagete seymourensis is a moth in the family Autostichidae. It was described by Bernard Landry in 2002. It is found on the Galápagos Islands.

== Etymology ==
The species name refers to North Seymour Island, where it was found.
