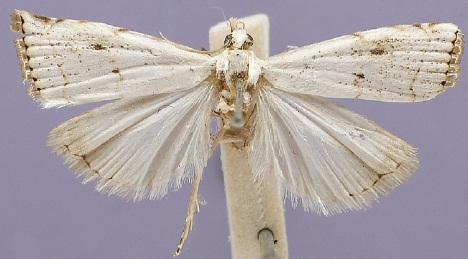

Scientific classification
- Domain: Eukaryota
- Kingdom: Animalia
- Phylum: Arthropoda
- Class: Insecta
- Order: Lepidoptera
- Family: Crambidae
- Genus: Catharylla
- Species: C. paulella

Binomial name
- Catharylla paulella Schaus, 1922

= Catharylla paulella =

Species of moth

Catharylla paulella is a moth of the family Crambidae described by William Schaus in 1922. It is found in Brazil (Federal District, Maranhão, Mato Grosso, Pará, São Paulo) and Bolivia.

The length of the forewings is 7–8 mm for males and 9–9.5 mm for females. The costal line on the forewings is brown or dirty white and the median transverse line is ochreous with two dark brown strongly pronounced spots. The subterminal transverse line is ochreous, with a small triangular spot on the costal margin. The hindwings are white, the outer margin with a thin ochreous line in the apical half.
