= Neurostrota =

Scientific classification
- Kingdom: Animalia
- Phylum: Arthropoda
- Class: Insecta
- Order: Lepidoptera
- Family: Gracillariidae
- Subfamily: Gracillariinae
- Genus: Neurostrota; Ely, 1918

Species
- See text

Genus of moths

Neurostrota is a genus of moths in the family Gracillariidae.

== Species ==
- Neurostrota brunnea Landry, 2006
- Neurostrota cupreella (Walsingham, 1897)
- Neurostrota gunniella (Busck, 1906)
- Neurostrota magnifica Landry, 2006
- Neurostrota pithecolobiella Busck, [1934]
