= Sparganothina venezolana =

Scientific classification
- Kingdom: Animalia
- Phylum: Arthropoda
- Clade: Pancrustacea
- Class: Insecta
- Order: Lepidoptera
- Family: Tortricidae
- Genus: Sparganothina
- Species: S. venezolana

Binomial name
- Sparganothina venezolana Landry, in Landry & Powell, 2001

Species of moth

Sparganothina venezolana is a species of moth of the family Tortricidae. It is found in Venezuela.
