= Netechmodes landryi =

Scientific classification
- Kingdom: Animalia
- Phylum: Arthropoda
- Class: Insecta
- Order: Lepidoptera
- Family: Tortricidae
- Genus: Netechmodes
- Species: N. landryi

Binomial name
- Netechmodes landryi Razowski, 2004

Species of moth

Netechmodes landryi is a species of moth of the family Tortricidae. It is found in Pichincha Province, Ecuador.

The wingspan is 13 mm.
