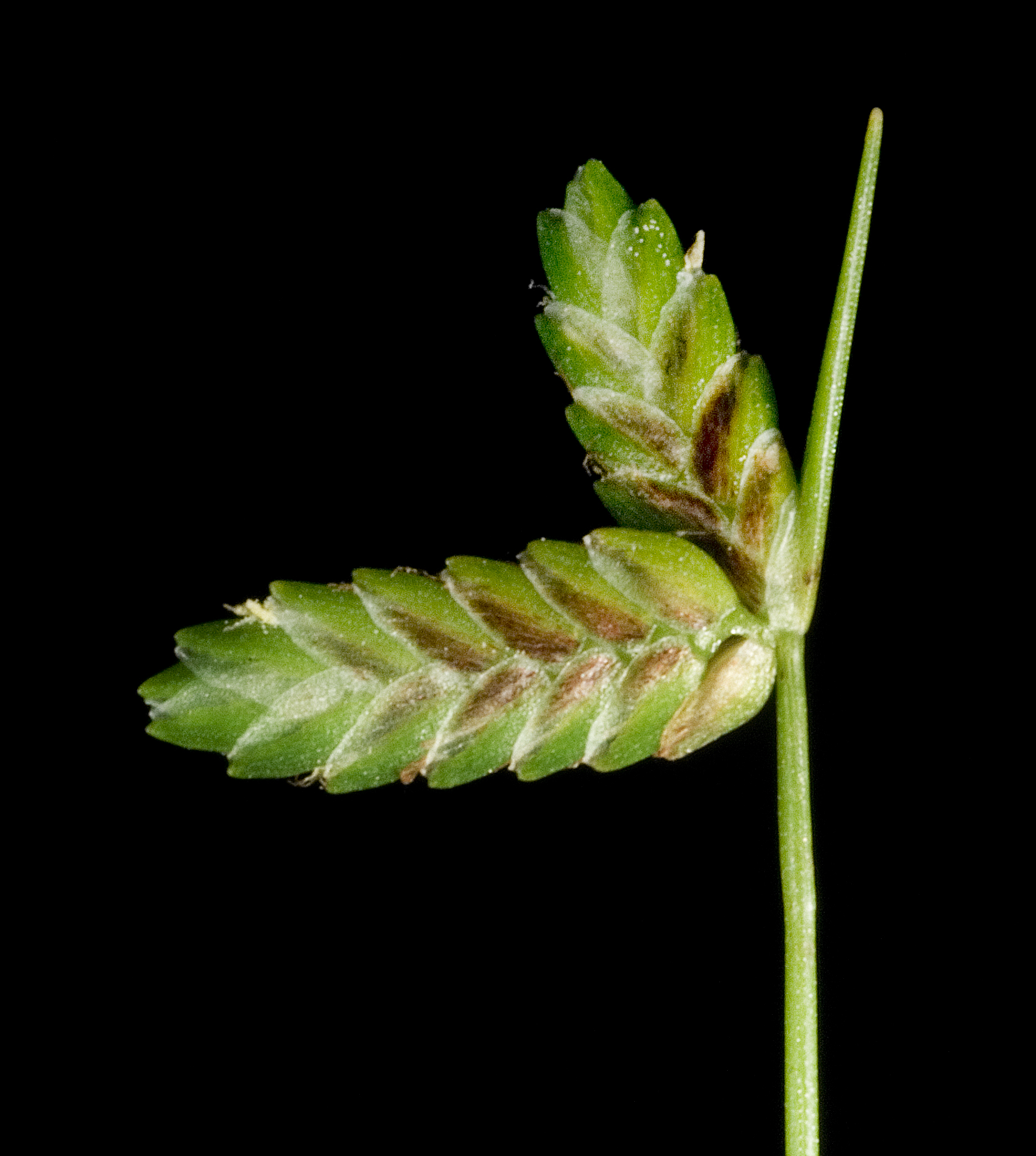
- Cyperus tenellus

Scientific classification
- Kingdom: Plantae
- Clade: Tracheophytes
- Clade: Angiosperms
- Clade: Monocots
- Clade: Commelinids
- Order: Poales
- Family: Cyperaceae
- Genus: Cyperus
- Species: C. tenellus

Binomial name
- Cyperus tenellus L.f.

= Cyperus tenellus =

Tiny Flatsedge

Species of plant

Cyperus tenellus is a sedge of the family Cyperaceae commonly known as the tiny flatsedge.

According to Plants of the World Online, C. tenellus is a synonym of Cyperus fugax, a species native to the Americas.

The annual herb or grass-like sedge typically grows to a height of 0.02 to 0.12 metres (0.07 to 0.39 ft) and has a tufted habit. In Australia it blooms between spring and summer from August to January producing green-brown flowers.

It is an introduced species to Western Australia it is found around swamps and pools or other damp places in the Mid West, Wheatbelt, Peel, South West and Great Southern regions where it grows in sandy, loamy or clay soils often around granite. The species is found in other areas of southern Australia including South Australia and New South Wales.

== See also ==
- List of Cyperus species
