= Sparganothina browni =

Scientific classification
- Kingdom: Animalia
- Phylum: Arthropoda
- Clade: Pancrustacea
- Class: Insecta
- Order: Lepidoptera
- Family: Tortricidae
- Genus: Sparganothina
- Species: S. browni

Binomial name
- Sparganothina browni Landry, in Landry & Powell, 2001

Species of moth

Sparganothina browni is a species of moth of the family Tortricidae. It is found in Veracruz, Mexico.

The length of the forewings is 9.2-9.4 mm for males and 8.9-9.6 mm for females.

== Etymology ==
The species is named in honour of Dr. John W. Brown.
