= Untomia =

Scientific classification
- Domain: Eukaryota
- Kingdom: Animalia
- Phylum: Arthropoda
- Class: Insecta
- Order: Lepidoptera
- Family: Gelechiidae
- Subfamily: Anacampsinae
- Genus: Untomia; Busck, 1906

Genus of moths

Untomia is a genus of moths in the family Gelechiidae.

== Species ==
- Untomia acicularis Meyrick, 1918
- Untomia albistrigella (Chambers, 1872)
- Untomia alticolens Walsingham, 1911
- Untomia formularis Meyrick, 1929
- Untomia latistriga Walsingham, 1911
- Untomia lunatella Landry, 2010
- Untomia melanobathra Meyrick, 1918
- Untomia rotundata Walsingham, 1911
- Untomia untomiella Busck, 1906
