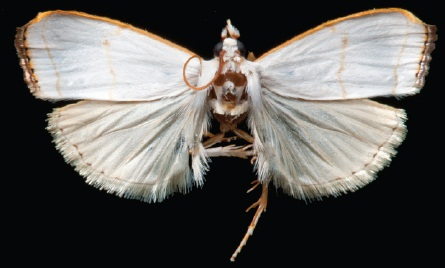

Scientific classification
- Domain: Eukaryota
- Kingdom: Animalia
- Phylum: Arthropoda
- Class: Insecta
- Order: Lepidoptera
- Family: Crambidae
- Genus: Catharylla
- Species: C. tenellus

Binomial name
- Catharylla tenellus (Zeller, 1839)

Synonyms
- Crambus tenellus Zeller, 1839; Catharylla tenella; Argyria tenella; Platytes tenella

= Catharylla tenellus =

Species of moth

Catharylla tenellus is a moth of the family Crambidae. It is found in the Atlantic Forest of Brazil in the states of Bahia, Minas Gerais, Paraná, Rio de Janeiro, and São Paulo.

The length of the forewings is 10.5–12 mm for males and 12–16 mm for females. The forewings are snow white with an ochreous costal line. The median and subterminal transverse lines are ochreous and the outer margin is ochreous with seven dark brown spots. The hindwings are cream-coloured, the outer margin with small ochreous brown spots forming a more or less continuous line.
