= Eupithecia landryi =

Scientific classification
- Kingdom: Animalia
- Phylum: Arthropoda
- Class: Insecta
- Order: Lepidoptera
- Family: Geometridae
- Genus: Eupithecia
- Species: E. landryi

Binomial name
- Eupithecia landryi H.A. Vargas, 2011

Species of moth

Eupithecia landryi is a moth in the family Geometridae. It is found in the coastal valleys of the northern desert of Chile.

The length of the forewings is about 5.9 mm for males. Adults have been recorded on wing in January.
