= Micrelephas =

Scientific classification
- Domain: Eukaryota
- Kingdom: Animalia
- Phylum: Arthropoda
- Class: Insecta
- Order: Lepidoptera
- Family: Crambidae
- Subfamily: Crambinae
- Tribe: incertae sedis
- Genus: Micrelephas; Dognin, 1905

Genus of moths

Micrelephas is a genus of moths of the family Crambidae.

== Species ==
- Micrelephas chalybeus B. Landry, 2003
- Micrelephas crassipalpis Dognin, 1905
- Micrelephas gaskini B. Landry, 2003
- Micrelephas helenae B. Landry, 2003
- Micrelephas interruptus (Zeller, 1866)
- Micrelephas kadenii (Zeller, 1863)
- Micrelephas longicilia Landry & Becker in Landry, Becker & Mally, 2013
- Micrelephas mesodonta (Zeller, 1877)
- Micrelephas pictella (Schaus, 1922)
- Micrelephas pseudokadenii B. Landry, 2003
