= Galagete darwini =

Scientific classification
- Kingdom: Animalia
- Phylum: Arthropoda
- Clade: Pancrustacea
- Class: Insecta
- Order: Lepidoptera
- Family: Autostichidae
- Genus: Galagete
- Species: G. darwini

Binomial name
- Galagete darwini Landry, 2002

Species of moth

Galagete darwini is a moth in the family Autostichidae. It was described by Bernard Landry in 2002. It is found on the Galápagos Islands.

The larvae feed on the dead leaves and/or branches of Scalesia baurii.
