= Acrocercops serrigera =

Scientific classification
- Domain: Eukaryota
- Kingdom: Animalia
- Phylum: Arthropoda
- Class: Insecta
- Order: Lepidoptera
- Family: Gracillariidae
- Genus: Acrocercops
- Species: A. serrigera

Binomial name
- Acrocercops serrigera Meyrick, 1915

Species of moth

Acrocercops serrigera is a moth of the family Gracillariidae. It is found in Ecuador, the Galápagos Islands and Peru.
