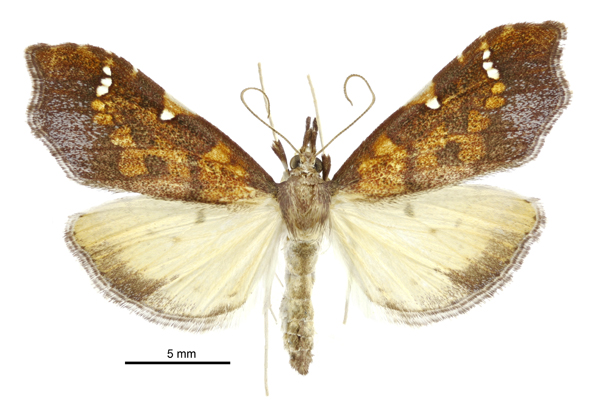
- Deana hybreasalis

Scientific classification
- Kingdom: Animalia
- Phylum: Arthropoda
- Clade: Pancrustacea
- Class: Insecta
- Order: Lepidoptera
- Family: Crambidae
- Subfamily: Spilomelinae
- Tribe: Udeini; Mally et al., 2019

= Udeini =

Tribe of moths

Udeini is a tribe in the species-rich subfamily Spilomelinae in the pyraloid moth family Crambidae. The tribe was erected by Richard Mally, James E. Hayden, Christoph Neinhuis, Bjarte H. Jordal and Matthias Nuss in 2019.

== Description ==
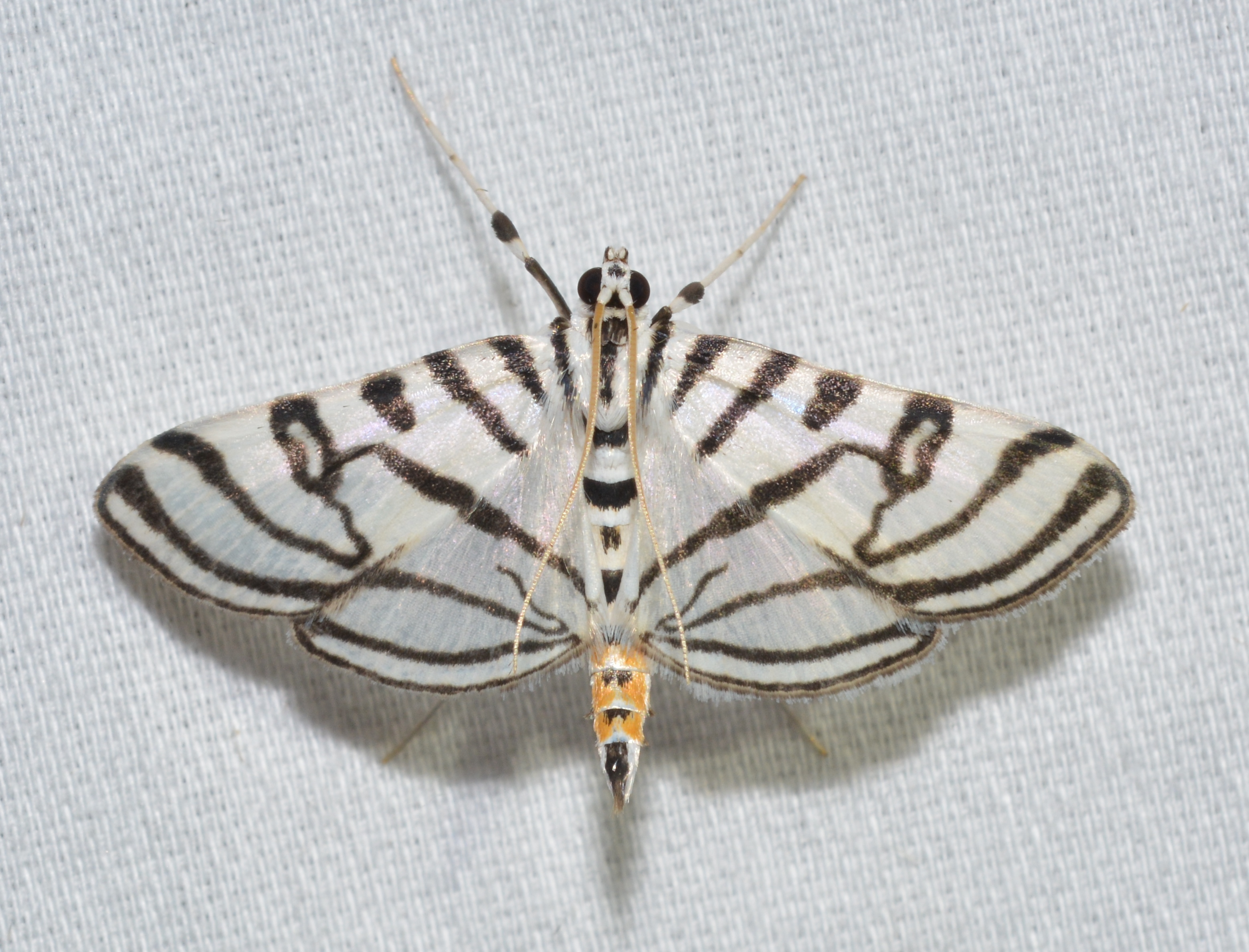
Conchylodes ovulalis, adult

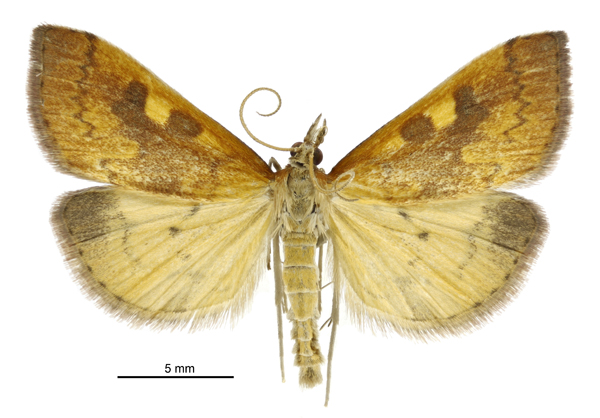
Mnesictena flavidalis, adult male

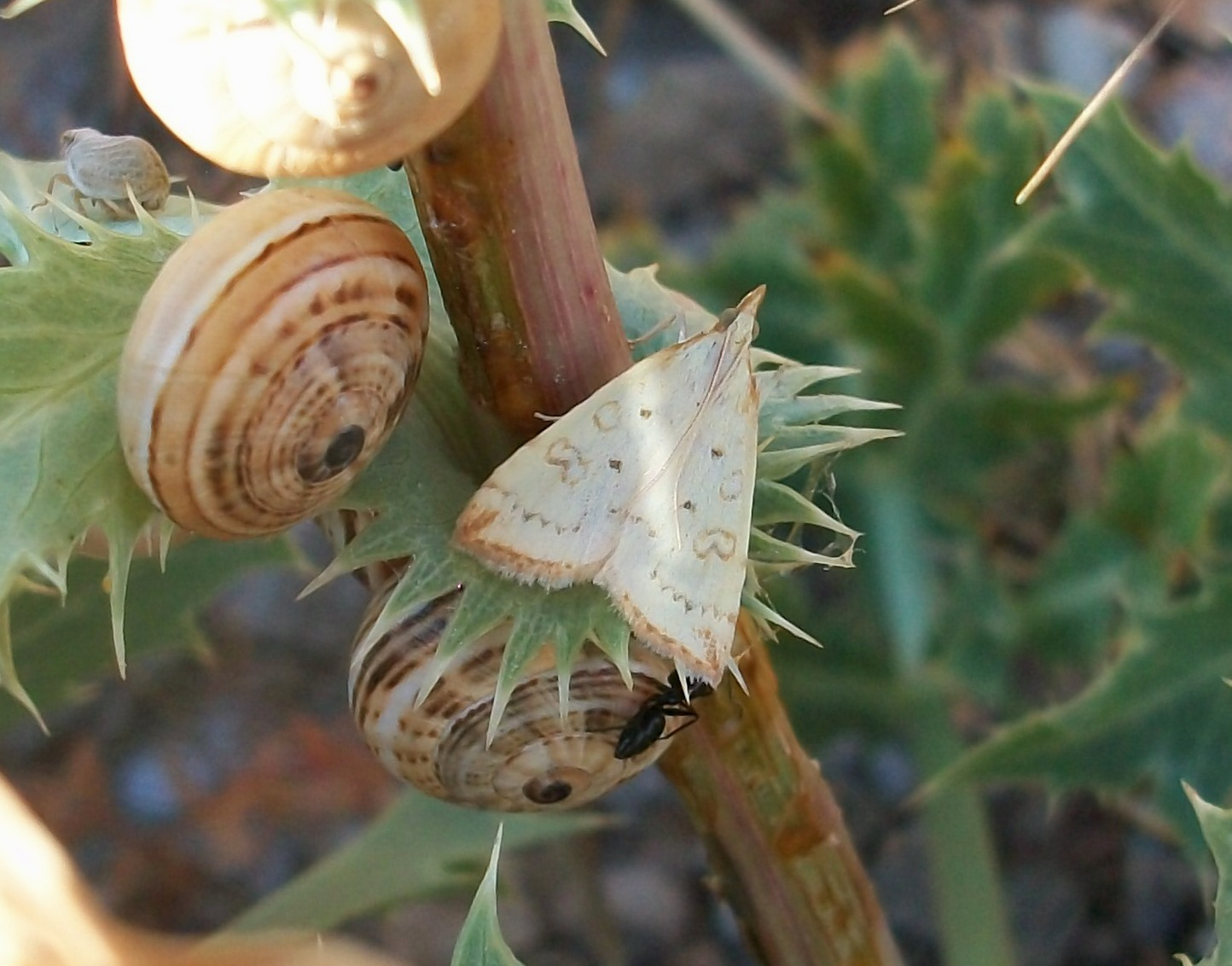
Udea institalis, adult

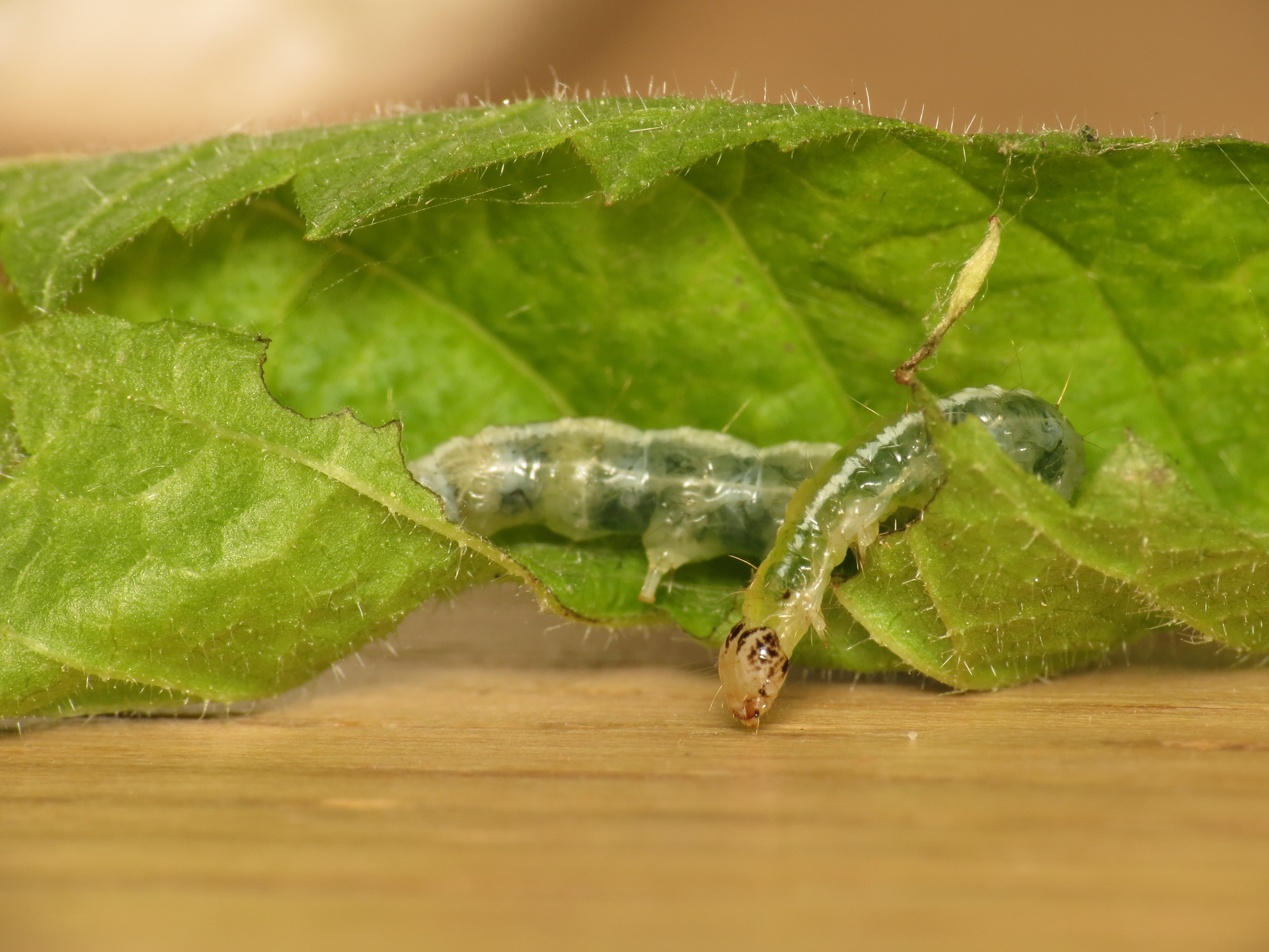
Udea prunalis, caterpillar

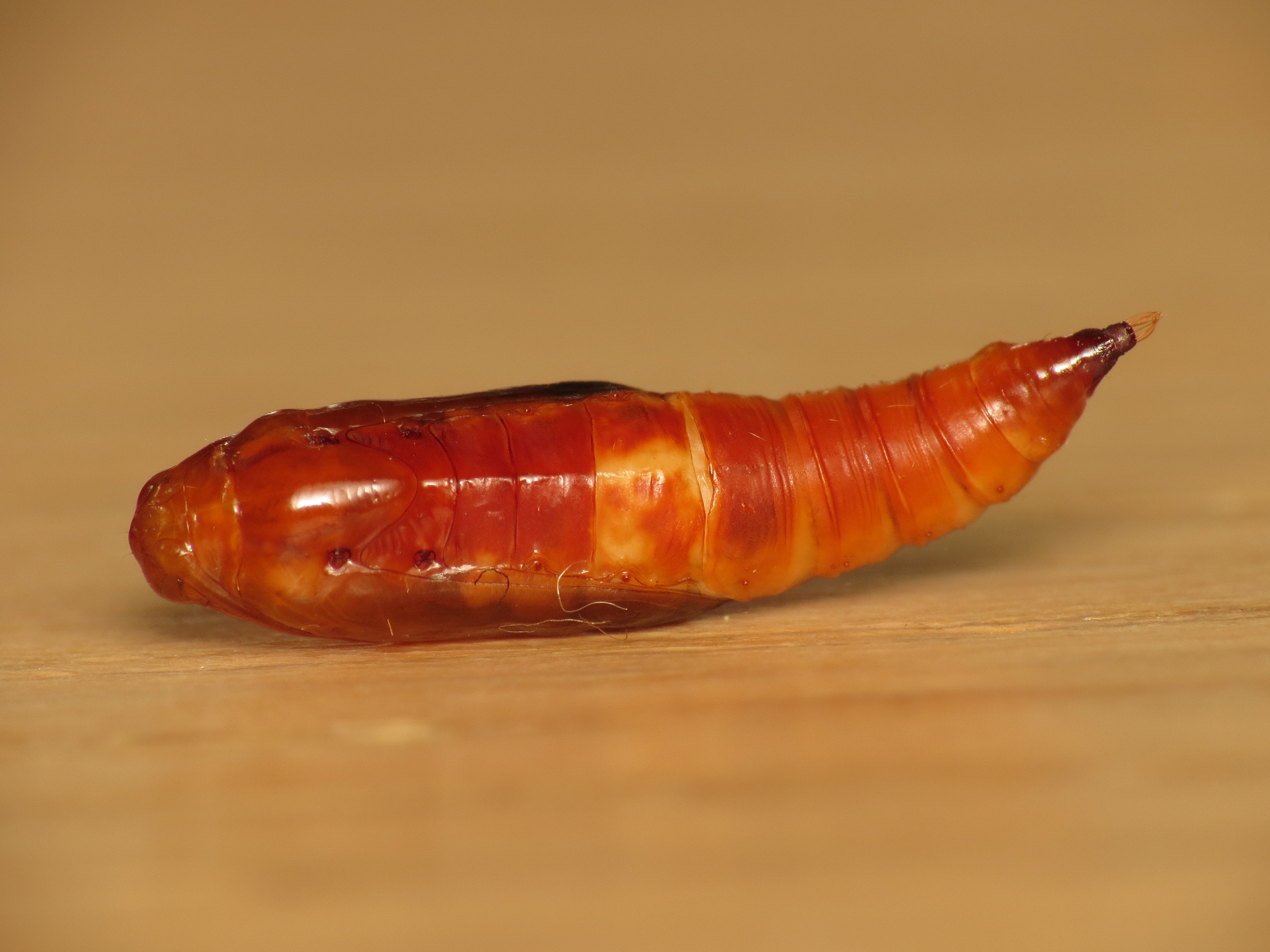
Udea prunalis, pupa

The tribe is circumscribed by three synapomorphies: In the male genitalia, the depth of the central vertical split of the juxta is 10-60% of the juxta length. In the female genitalia, the colliculum, i.e. the posteriormost section of the ductus bursae, situated between the antrum and the attachment of the ductus seminalis, is strongly sclerotised. Furthermore, the corpus bursae usually bears an elongate rhombical, an ovate or an "ediacaroid" signum, named after the Ediacaran biota from the Neoproterozoic Era, which exhibit body shapes similar to the shape of the signum in Udeini.

Udeini is one of the four so-called non-euspilomeline tribes, which share several plesiomorphic morphological characters with the sister group of Spilomelinae, the Pyraustinae. For example, female imagines of some species show a reduction of the frenular bristles in the wing coupling mechanism to only one bristle, e.g. in the Udea alpinalis and U. itysalis species groups (sensu).

The uncus shape in the male genitalia is very diverse, ranging from unicapitate in the Udea genus group (comprising Deana, Mnesictena, Tanaophysa, Udea and Udeoides) to conical in Conchylodes, reduced to a triangle in Sisyracera and Ercta, or even reduced to a slim transverse band over the tegumen in the monotypic genus Cheverella. The Conchylodes genus group is characterised by hair-like monofilament chaetae on the uncus of the male genitalia, as opposed to the thick bifid chaetae present in most other Spilomelinae. The valva costa is slightly concave, with the ventral sacculus edge being parallel to the costa (which is inflated in Cheverella), and apical of the sacculus, the valva tapers towards a rounded apex.

The female genitalia exhibit a strongly sclerotized antrum except for Cheverella, where it is weakly sclerotized. A membraneous appendix bursae is present in Conchylodes, Ercta and Sisyracera, which is attached to the anterior end of the corpus bursae in the former two genera, and to the posterior end in the latter genus. In all Udea species groups except the Udea ferrugalis group, an accessory signum is present in the conjunction of ductus bursae and corpus bursae.

== Food plants ==
Species of Udeini feed on a broad spectrum of food plants. Some species like Udea rubigalis are highly polyphagous, feeding on plants from a wide variety of plant families. The caterpillars of Mnesictena feed on Muehlenbeckia (Polygonaceae), Urtica and Australina (Urticaceae). Conchylodes larvae have been recorded from Annonaceae, Asteraceae, Boraginaceae, Cordiaceae, Malvaceae and Platanaceae, and the caterpillars of Sisyracera and Cheverella are recorded from Boraginaceae.

== Distribution ==
Several genera are geographically confined, e.g. Deana and Mnesictena to New Zealand, Udeoides to the Afrotropical realm and Sisyracera to the Neotropical realm. Udea on the other hand, with its 214 species, is found on every continent except Antarctica, and members of the Udea ferrugalis species group are especially abundant on oceanic islands.

== Systematics ==
Nine genera, altogether comprising 262 species, are currently placed in Udeini:

- Cheverella B. Landry in Landry, Roque-Albelo & Hayden, 2011
- Conchylodes Guenée, 1854 (synonyms Ledereria Snellen, 1873, Nonazochis Amsel, 1956)
- Deana Butler, 1879 (synonyms Adena Walker, 1863, Nesarcha Meyrick, 1884)
- Ercta Walker, 1859 (misspelling Erota Walker, 1859)
- Mnesictena Meyrick, 1884
- Sisyracera Möschler, 1890
- Tanaophysa Warren, 1892
- Udea Guenée in Duponchel, 1845 (synonyms Melanomecyna Butler, 1883, Notophytis Meyrick, 1932, Protaulacistis Meyrick, 1899, Protocolletis Meyrick, 1888, Stantira Walker, 1863) – type genus of the tribe
- Udeoides Maes, 2006

The name Udeini was proposed by Patrice Leraut in 1997 in Pyraustinae. However, the proposed name was not accompanied by a description to differentiate the taxon, and therefore lacking a requirement issued by the International Code of Zoological Nomenclature in their article 13.1 for names published after 1930.
