= Cheverella =

Scientific classification
- Kingdom: Animalia
- Phylum: Arthropoda
- Clade: Pancrustacea
- Class: Insecta
- Order: Lepidoptera
- Family: Crambidae
- Tribe: Udeini
- Genus: Cheverella; B. Landry in Landry, Roque-Albelo & Hayden, 2011
- Species: C. galapagensis

Binomial name
- Cheverella galapagensis B. Landry in Landry, Roque-Albelo & Hayden, 2011

Genus of moths

Cheverella is a monotypic genus of snout moths in the subfamily Spilomelinae of the family Crambidae. It contains only one species, Cheverella galapagensis, which is endemic to the Galápagos Islands of Ecuador. Both the genus and the species were first described by Bernard Landry in 2011. The genus is placed in the tribe Udeini.

== Description ==
Imagines (adults) of Cheverella galapagensis are medium-sized, with a forewing length of 6.4 to 9.6 mm in males and 7.7 to 10.3 mm in females. The upper side of the rather narrow forewings is white in ground colour, with dark brown antemedian, postmedian and submarginal lines, and large deep dark brown costal markings. Hindwings white with more or less prominent light brown submarginal and marginal lines, except in the anal field of the hindwings. Thorax white with brown spots, abdomen mostly white, dorsally with some greyish brown on most if not all segments. Forelegs dorsally greyish brown, ventrally white, midlegs white with apical femur and tibia brown, and hindlegs entirely white.

In the male genitalia, the tegumen exhibits straight sides and a semi-circular top, over which the uncus, reduced to a narrow band (an apomorphy of the genus), arches. The uncus centre is loosely set with simple thin chaetae. Vinculum broad U-shaped with a sharp, short keeled ventral tip. Juxta broad, dorsally rectangular, ventrally somewhat rhomboid and broader. Valva costae very broad, straight to slightly concave, basally each with a medially directed slender, apically pointed projection (which are, however, not the transtilla arms); valva apex broad rounded, ventral valva side medially broadly bulging outward, in basal half with elongate sacculus. A stout-tipped, short posteroventrad directed fibula emerging from a broad sclerotised base stretching from close to the costa base to the ventral valva edge. Phallus short, broad, evenly sclerotised, with a short coecum; vesica with a compact field of about 20 short, slender cornuti.

Female genitalia with a cup-shaped, weakly sclerotised antrum. In its posterior part, the ductus bursae is sclerotised and longitudinally ridged, the anterior part is membranous and gradually widens towards the globular corpus bursae, which contains a minute spine-like signum near the conjunction with the ductus bursae.

Based on material collected on Fernandina Island, the known flying period is between January and May, as well as in August, October, and November. The species inhabits various pristine or anthropized habitats ranging from the littoral zone up to 1341 m elevation.

The caterpillars or pupae are not scientifically described as of yet.

DNA barcode data is stored in the Barcode of Life Data System (BOLD), although the sequences are not publicly accessible.

== Food plants ==
The caterpillars feed on the Galápagos endemic plant Tournefortia pubescens (Boraginaceae), where they bore into the stems. Tournefortia species contain pyrrolizidine alkaloids, which are accumulated as chemical defence in another, unrelated Galápagos endemic moth species, Utetheisa galapagensis (Erebidae). It is not known whether larvae of C. galapagensis also accumulate these pyrrolizidine alkaloids in their bodies, and whether they remain in the imagines for chemical defence.

== Distribution ==
Cheverella galapagensis is recorded from the Gálapagos islands of Fernandina, Isabela, San Cristobal, Santa Cruz, Santiago. Apart from these islands, the host plant Tournefortia pubescens furthermore grows on the islands of Floreana, Pinzón and Wolf. Therefore, Cheverella galapagensis could potentially also live on the latter three islands, but has not been collected there, yet.

== Etymology ==
The genus name is derived from the word chévere, which is a frequent interjection heard in Ecuador and means "great", "nice", or "cool". The imago's unusual maculation prompted this interjection to the author of the species and others who examined adult specimens.
