= Buellia sulphurica =

Scientific classification
- Domain: Eukaryota
- Kingdom: Fungi
- Division: Ascomycota
- Class: Lecanoromycetes
- Order: Caliciales
- Family: Caliciaceae
- Genus: Buellia
- Species: B. sulphurica

Binomial name
- Buellia sulphurica Bungartz & Aptroot (2011)

Species of lichen

Buellia sulphurica is a species of saxicolous (rock-dwelling), crustose lichen in the family Caliciaceae. It was formally described as a new species in 2011 based on specimens from the Galápagos Islands, where it grows exclusively on volcanic rock near active sulfur vents. The lichen is recognized by its bright yellow colour, which stands out vividly against the dark volcanic landscape. Despite extensive searches, it has only been found on Isabela Island and remains a rare lichen in the Galápagos archipelago.

== Taxonomy ==
Buellia sulphurica was described as new to science in 2011 by Frank Bungartz and André Aptroot from material collected on the inner caldera rim of Volcán Alcedo, Isabela Island, Galápagos. The specific epithet refers both to the lichen's sulphur-yellow thallus and its proximity to active sulphur vents. Although the species shows several features more typical of Rinodina—a colourless (hyaline) hypothecium, minute apothecia and spores that at first develop a thickened septum (the so-called Physconia-type ontogeny)—it has a Bacidia-type ascus, which anchors it in the genus Buellia. It is further distinguished by the presence of rhizocarpic acid, a secondary metabolite rarely reported in the genus, and by its ecological preference for freshly weathered basalt close to volcanic gas emissions.

== Description ==
The lichen forms a thin crust comprising discrete, powder-yellow areoles—small, polygonal patches that sometimes lift slightly at the edges. No dark prothallus (border) is visible. The surface is matt and dusted with a fine whitish bloom, a result of minute crystals that dissolve in potassium hydroxide solution; coarser, inert mineral crystals up to 50 micrometres (μm) are also embedded in the thallus.

Reproductive structures are abundant but minute. Each black apothecium begins almost immersed in the thallus with a fleeting thalline rim, then soon becomes adnate to sessile, 0.15–0.25 mm across, and markedly convex. The proper margin is black and rapidly excluded, while stray flecks of yellow thallus tissue often cling to the disc as it emerges. Internally the apothecium has a very thin, pale receptacle (proper exciple) that merges into a clear hymenium; simple to sparsely branched paraphyses end in brown-capped tips. The eight-spored asci are club-shaped; their Bacidia-type amyloid reaction shows deep-blue sides with a pale core in iodine. Ascospores are one-septate, oblong and 10–13 × 6–7 μm, with a briefly thickened median wall in juvenile stages but no outer ornamentation. No pycnidia have been observed in B. sulphurica.

Chemically the cortex contains no lichen products detectable by the common spot tests (K, C, P all negative), whereas the medulla holds rhizocarpic acid, likewise unreactive to these tests but identifiable by thin-layer chromatography. The hymenium, unlike the thallus, gives a strong amyloid (blue) reaction in Lugol's iodine solution.

== Habitat and distribution ==
Buellia sulphurica is a saxicolous (rock-dwelling) crust restricted to basalt boulders and outcrops within a few metres of active sulphur fumaroles. The type material came from the north-north-west-facing inner wall of Volcán Alcedo at 1,055 m above sea level, in open scrub dotted with Tournefortia rufosericea and Adiantum concinnum. Additional specimens were later found on the outer slope of Volcán Chico on Sierra Negra, also on Isabela Island. The bright neon-yellow thalli stand out clearly against the dark lava, yet repeated searches on other Galápagos islands have failed to locate the species farther afield. It is one of 13 Buellia species that have been documented from the Galápagos islands.
