= Conchylodes graphialis =

Scientific classification
- Kingdom: Animalia
- Phylum: Arthropoda
- Class: Insecta
- Order: Lepidoptera
- Family: Crambidae
- Genus: Conchylodes
- Species: C. graphialis

Binomial name
- Conchylodes graphialis (Schaus, 1912)

Species of moth

Conchylodes graphialis is a species of snout moth in the tribe Udeini of the subfamily Spilomelinae. It was described by William Schaus in 1912 based on material collected in Costa Rica.
