= Conchylodes diphteralis =

Scientific classification
- Kingdom: Animalia
- Phylum: Arthropoda
- Class: Insecta
- Order: Lepidoptera
- Family: Crambidae
- Genus: Conchylodes
- Species: C. diphteralis

Binomial name
- Conchylodes diphteralis (Geyer in Hübner, 1832)

Synonyms
- Lypotigris diphteralis Geyer in Hübner, 1832

Species of moth

Conchylodes diphteralis is a moth in the family Crambidae. It was described by Carl Geyer in 1832. It is found from the southeastern United States, where it has been recorded from Florida, through the West Indies (including Cuba, Jamaica and Hispaniola) to South America.

The wingspan is 24–29 mm. Adults are on wing nearly year round in Florida.

The larvae feed on Cordia species.
