= Ercta elutalis =

Scientific classification
- Kingdom: Animalia
- Phylum: Arthropoda
- Class: Insecta
- Order: Lepidoptera
- Family: Crambidae
- Genus: Ercta
- Species: E. elutalis

Binomial name
- Ercta elutalis (Walker, 1859)

Synonyms
- Cataclysta elutalis Walker, 1859

Species of moth

Ercta elutalis is a moth in the family Crambidae. It was described by Francis Walker in 1859. It is found in Sri Lanka.
