= Conchylodes stictiperalis =

Scientific classification
- Kingdom: Animalia
- Phylum: Arthropoda
- Class: Insecta
- Order: Lepidoptera
- Family: Crambidae
- Genus: Conchylodes
- Species: C. stictiperalis

Binomial name
- Conchylodes stictiperalis Hampson, 1912

Species of moth

Conchylodes stictiperalis is a moth in the family Crambidae. It was described by George Hampson in 1912. It is found in Pará, Brazil.
