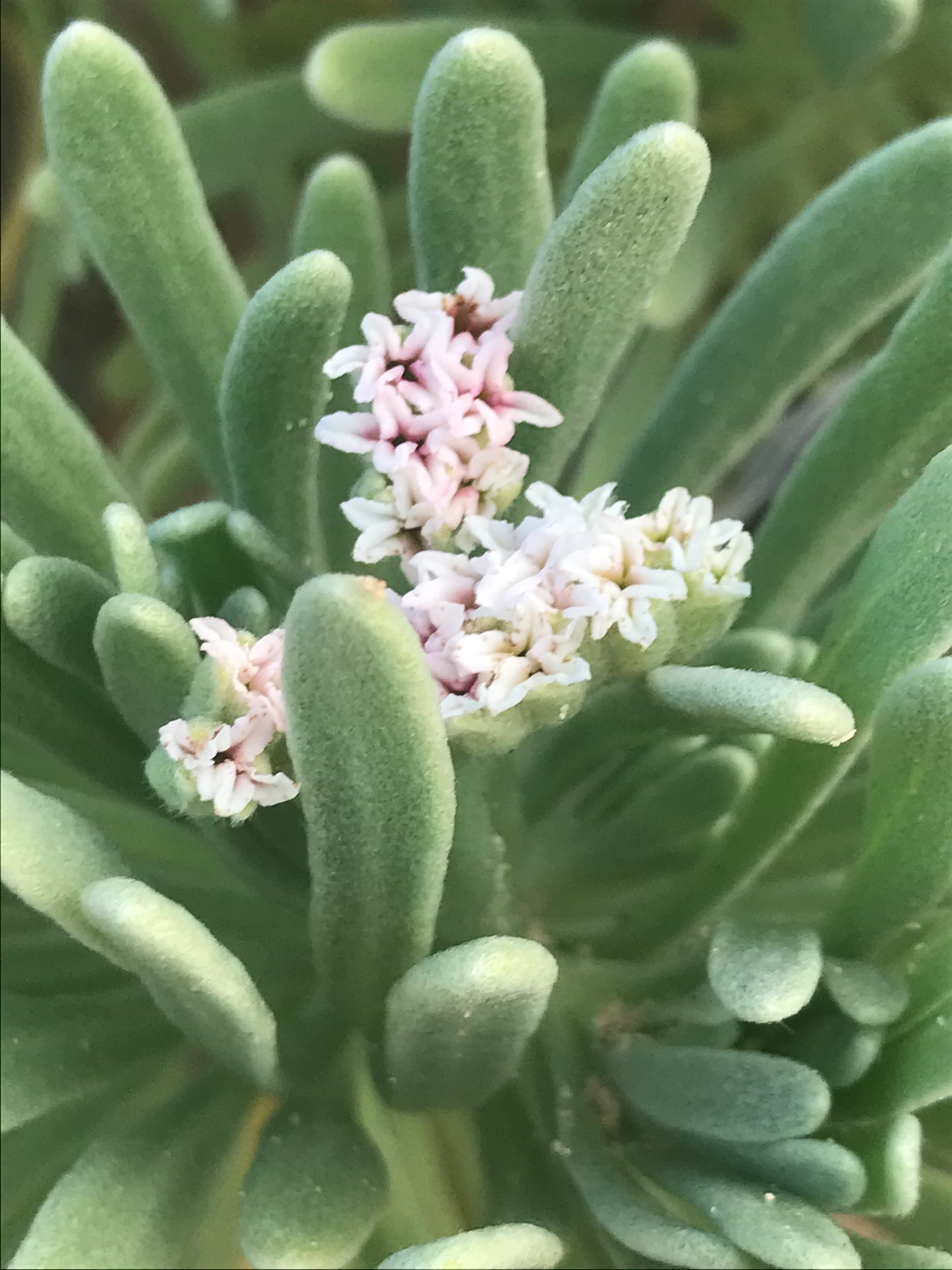
- Flowering in Aruba
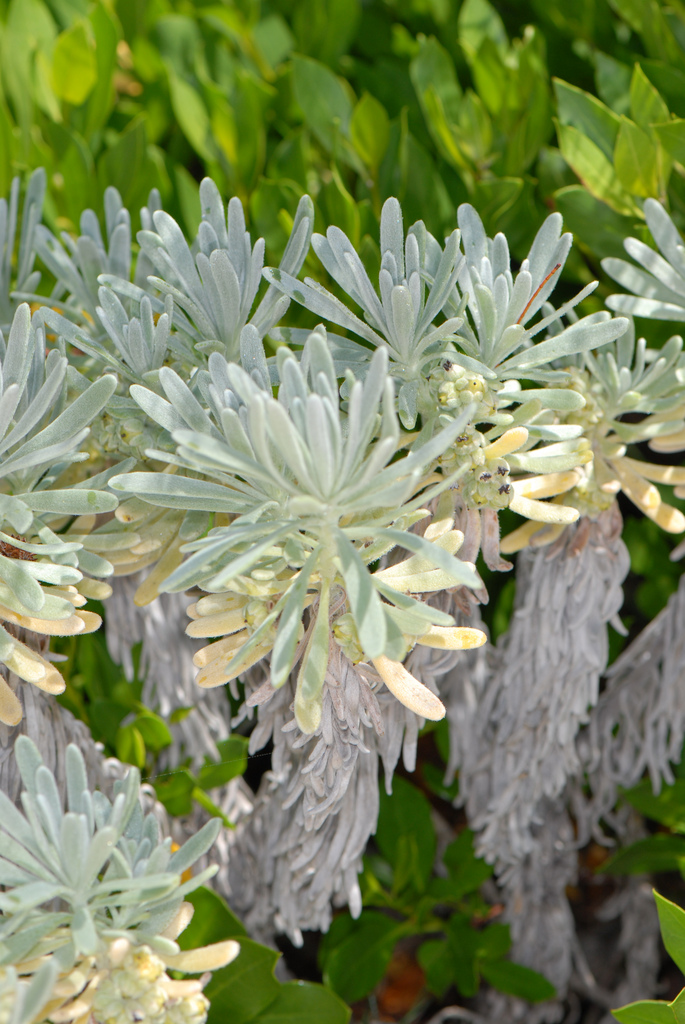
- Dead leaves often remain on the stem

Conservation status
- Least Concern (IUCN 3.1)

Scientific classification
- Kingdom: Plantae
- Clade: Tracheophytes
- Clade: Angiosperms
- Clade: Eudicots
- Clade: Asterids
- Order: Boraginales
- Family: Boraginaceae
- Genus: Tournefortia
- Species: T. gnaphalodes

Binomial name
- Tournefortia gnaphalodes (L.) R.Br. ex Roem. & Schult.

Synonyms
- Argusia gnaphalodes (L.) Heine; Heliotropium gnaphalodes L.; Mallotonia gnaphalodes (L.) Britton; Messerschmidia gnaphalodes (L.) I.M.Johnst.

= Tournefortia gnaphalodes =

Species of plant

Tournefortia gnaphalodes, the sea lavender, bay lavender, sea rosemary, iodine bush, or beach heliotrope, is a species of flowering plant in the family Boraginaceae. It is native to Florida, Mexico, Central America, the Caribbean, Bermuda, northeastern Colombia, and Venezuela. A semi‑succulent evergreen shrub reaching 5 ft (1.5 m), it is typically found in coastal areas. Occasionally cultivated as an ornamental, it is often used for dune stabilization.

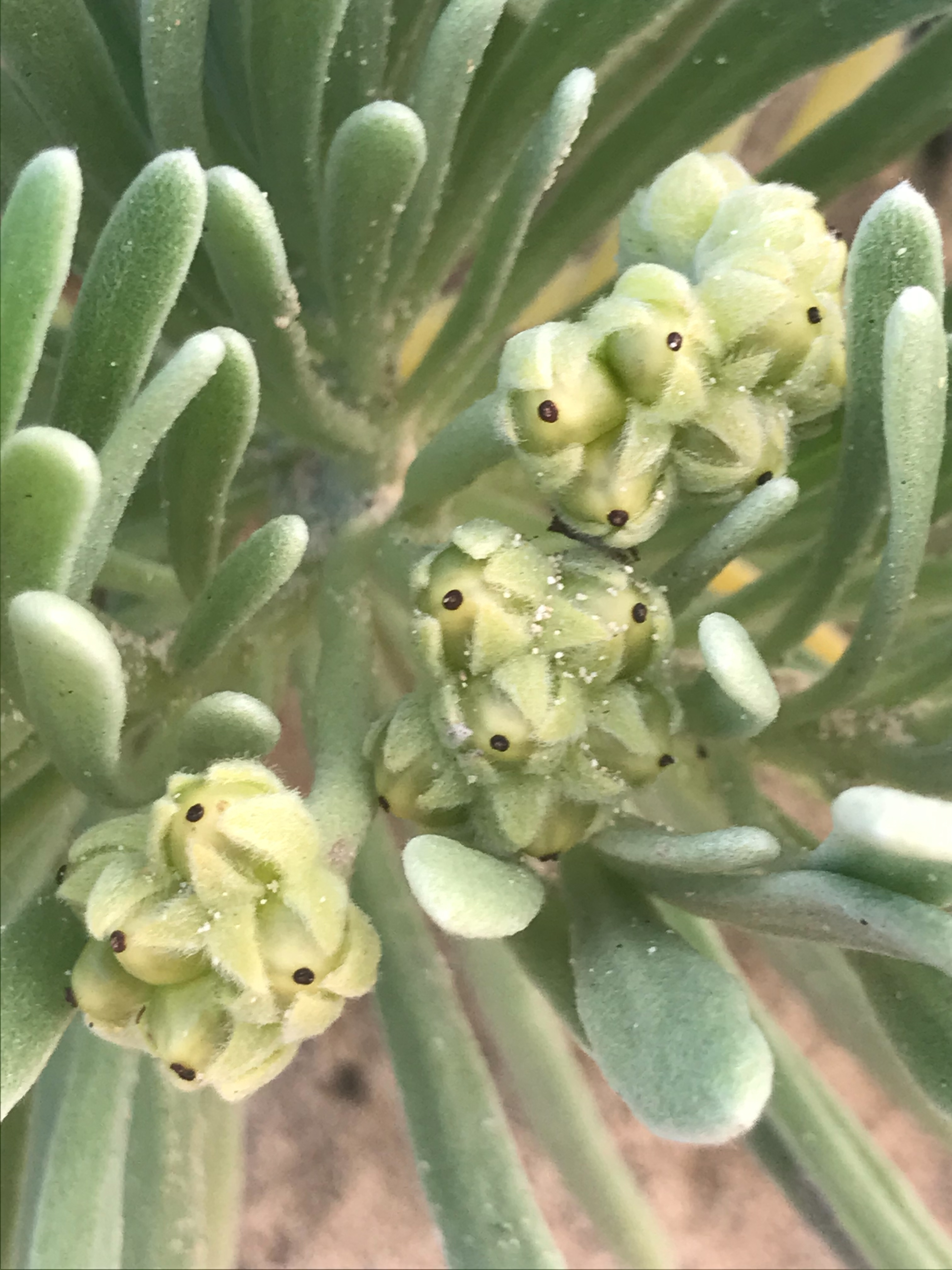
Developing fruit

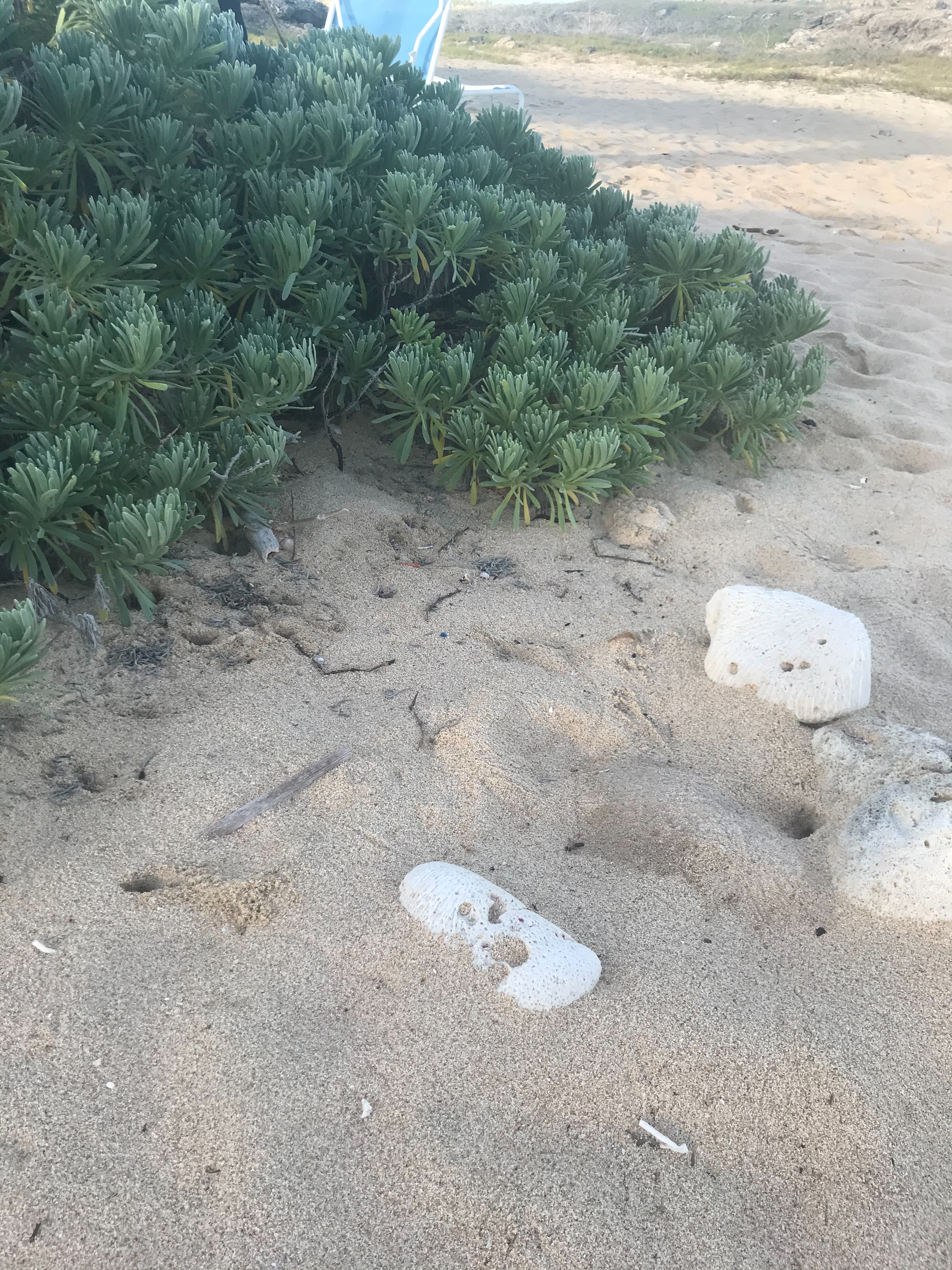
Stabilizing sand at the beach

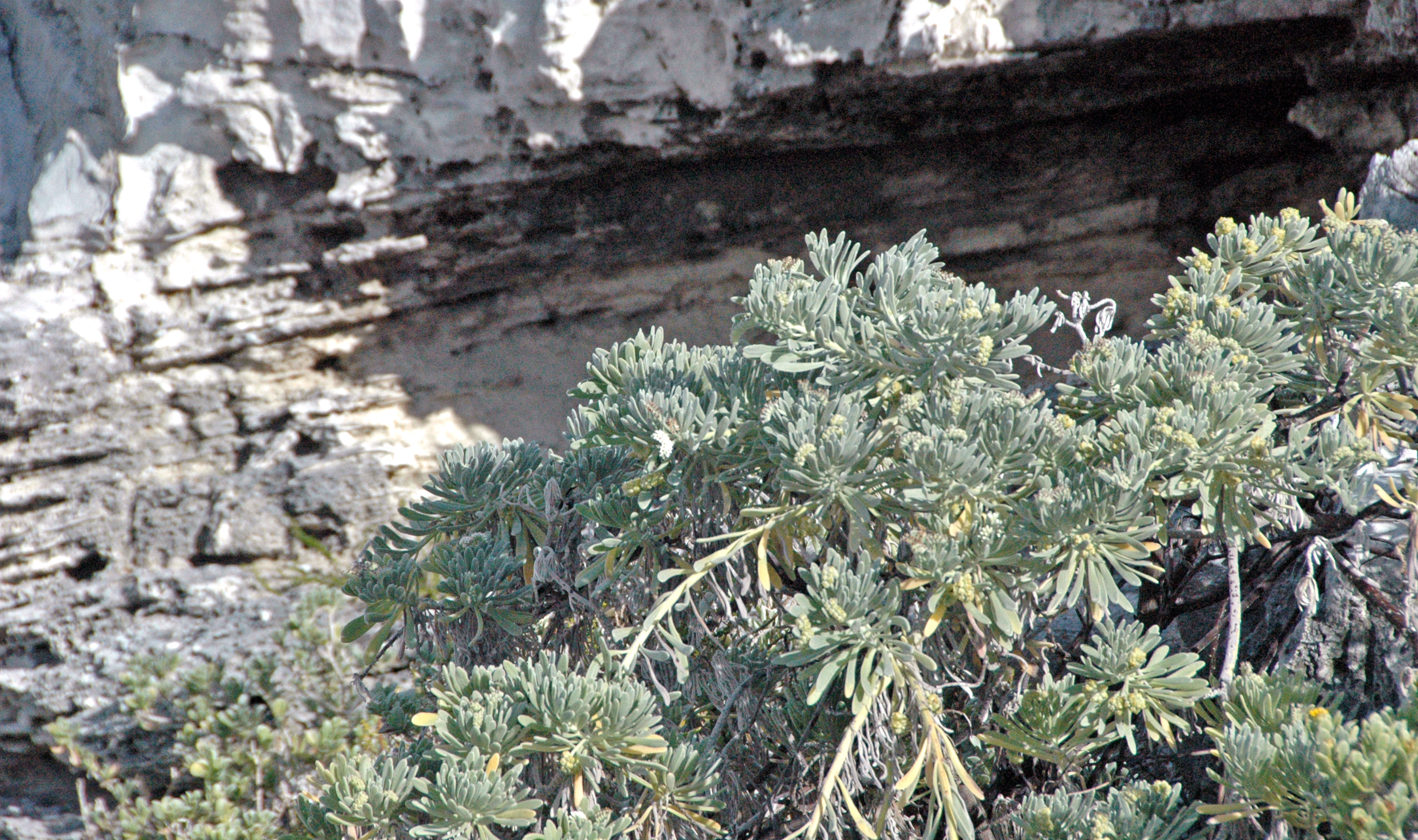
In the Bahamas
