= Arthur Gardiner Butler =

English entomologist, arachnologist and ornithologist (1844–1925)

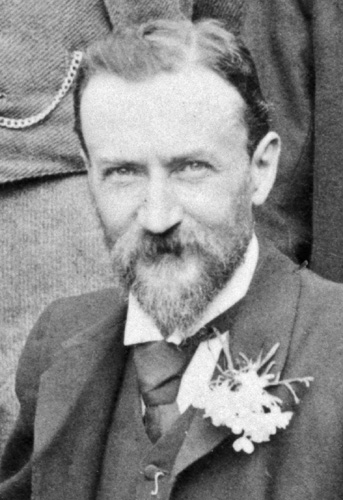
- Born: 27 June 1844; Chelsea, London
- Died: 28 May 1925 (aged 80); Beckenham, Kent

Arthur Gardiner Butler F.L.S., F.Z.S. (27 June 1844 – 28 May 1925) was an English entomologist, arachnologist and ornithologist. He worked at the British Museum on the taxonomy of birds, insects, and spiders.

== Biography ==
Arthur Gardiner Butler was born at Cheyne Walk, Chelsea, London. He was the son of Thomas Butler (1809–1908), assistant-secretary to the British Museum. He was educated at St. Paul's School, later receiving a year's tuition in drawing at the Art School of South Kensington.

At the British Museum, he was appointed as an officer with two roles, as an assistant-keeper in zoology and as an assistant-librarian in 1879. He retired in 1901 and devoted his later life to his garden and cagebirds.

Butler published many works on butterflies and moths, but Reginald Innes Pocock described these as merely "useful". He also published articles on spiders of Australia, the Galápagos, Madagascar, and other places. In 1859, he described the Deana moth.

== Selected works ==
=== Entomology ===
- "Monograph of the species of Charaxes, a genus of diurnal Lepidoptera". Proceedings of the Zoological Society of London 1865:622–639 (1866)
- Catalogue of Diurnal Lepidoptera of the Family Satyridae in the Collection of the British Museum (1868)
- Catalogue of Diurnal Lepidoptera Described by Fabricius in the Collection of the British Museum (1870)
- Lepidoptera Exotica, or, Descriptions and Illustrations of Exotic Lepidoptera (1869–1874)
- A list of the spiders of the genus Acrosoma, with descriptions of new species (1873)
- Tropical Butterflies and Moths (1873)
- Catalogue of the Lepidoptera of New Zealand (1874)
- The butterflies of Malacca (1879).
- "Catalogue of the Butterflies of New Zealand" (1880)
- With Herbert Druce (1846–1913), "Descriptions of New Genera and Species of Lepidoptera from Costa Rica". Cistula entomologica, 1: 95–118 (1872).
- "On a Collection of Lepidoptera from Southern Africa, with Descriptions of New Genera and Species" Annals and Magazine of Natural History (4) 16 (96): 394–420 (1875)
- "Descriptions of Some New Lepidoptera from Kilima-njaro" Proceedings of the Zoological Society of London 1888: 91–98 (1888)
- "On Two Collection of Lepidoptera Sent by H. H. Johnston, Esq., C.B., From British Central Africa" Proceedings of the Zoological Society of London 1893: 643–684, pl. 60 (1894)
- "Description of a New Species of Butterfly of the Genus Amauris Obtained by Mr. Scott Elliot in East Central Africa" Annals and Magazine of Natural History (6) 16 (91): 122–123 (1895)
- On Lepidoptera recently collected in British East Africa by Mr. G. F. Scott Elliot Proceedings of the Zoological Society of London 1895: 722–742, pl. 42–43 (1896)
- "On Two Collections of Lepidoptera Made by Mr R. Crawshay in Nyasa-land" Proceedings of the Zoological Society of London 1896: 817–850, pl. 41–42 (1897)

=== Ornithology ===
- Foreign Birds for Cage and Aviary, Order Passeres (1896–1897) illustrated by Frederick William Frohawk (1861–1946)
- Foreign Birds for Cage and Aviary (1910)
- Foreign Finches in Captivity 2nd edition (1899)
- —— (1886). British Birds' Eggs: A Handbook of British Oölogy. London: E.W. Janson. OCLC 7255543 (all editions).

== Sources ==
- Mullens, William Herbert; Swann, Harry Kirke (1917). Bibliography of British ornithology from the earliest times to the end of 1912, including biographical accounts of the principal writers and bibliographies of their published works. OCLC 820085516 (all editions). (p. 111–112)
