= Conchylodes salamisalis =

Blush conchylodes moth

Scientific classification
- Kingdom: Animalia
- Phylum: Arthropoda
- Class: Insecta
- Order: Lepidoptera
- Family: Crambidae
- Genus: Conchylodes
- Species: C. salamisalis

Binomial name
- Conchylodes salamisalis H. Druce, 1895

Species of moth

Conchylodes salamisalis, the blush conchylodes moth, is a moth in the family Crambidae. It was described by Herbert Druce in 1895. It is found in Ecuador, Costa Rica, Panama, Guatemala, Mexico and the southern United States, where it has been recorded from Texas.

The forewings and hindwings are silky hyaline white. There are three short dark brown streaks on the forewings, as well as two broad brown bands crossing the costal to the inner margin. There is a dark brown spot near the apex and a fawn submarginal band. There is a fawn spot on the hindwings with a fine black line on each side.
