= Udeoides muscosalis =

Scientific classification
- Kingdom: Animalia
- Phylum: Arthropoda
- Class: Insecta
- Order: Lepidoptera
- Family: Crambidae
- Genus: Udeoides
- Species: U. muscosalis

Binomial name
- Udeoides muscosalis (Hampson, 1913)

Synonyms
- Pionea muscosalis Hampson, 1913; Pionea muscosalis ab. jansensis Strand, 1922

Species of moth

Udeoides muscosalis is a moth in the family Crambidae. It was described by George Hampson in 1913. It is found in Kenya and South Africa.

The wingspan is about 20 mm. The forewings are sap-green, slightly irrorated with black, some deep rufous and blackish suffusion below and beyond end of cell and at the base of the inner margin. There is a diffused blackish subbasal line. The antemedial line is black, oblique and slightly sinuous and the terminal half of the costa has black striae with pale brown between them. The postmedial line is white, defined on the inner and outer sides by a series of black points, slightly excurved below the costa and at the middle. There is also a terminal white line with a series of black points on it and a black spot on its inner edge at the discal fold. The hindwings are fuscous brown.
