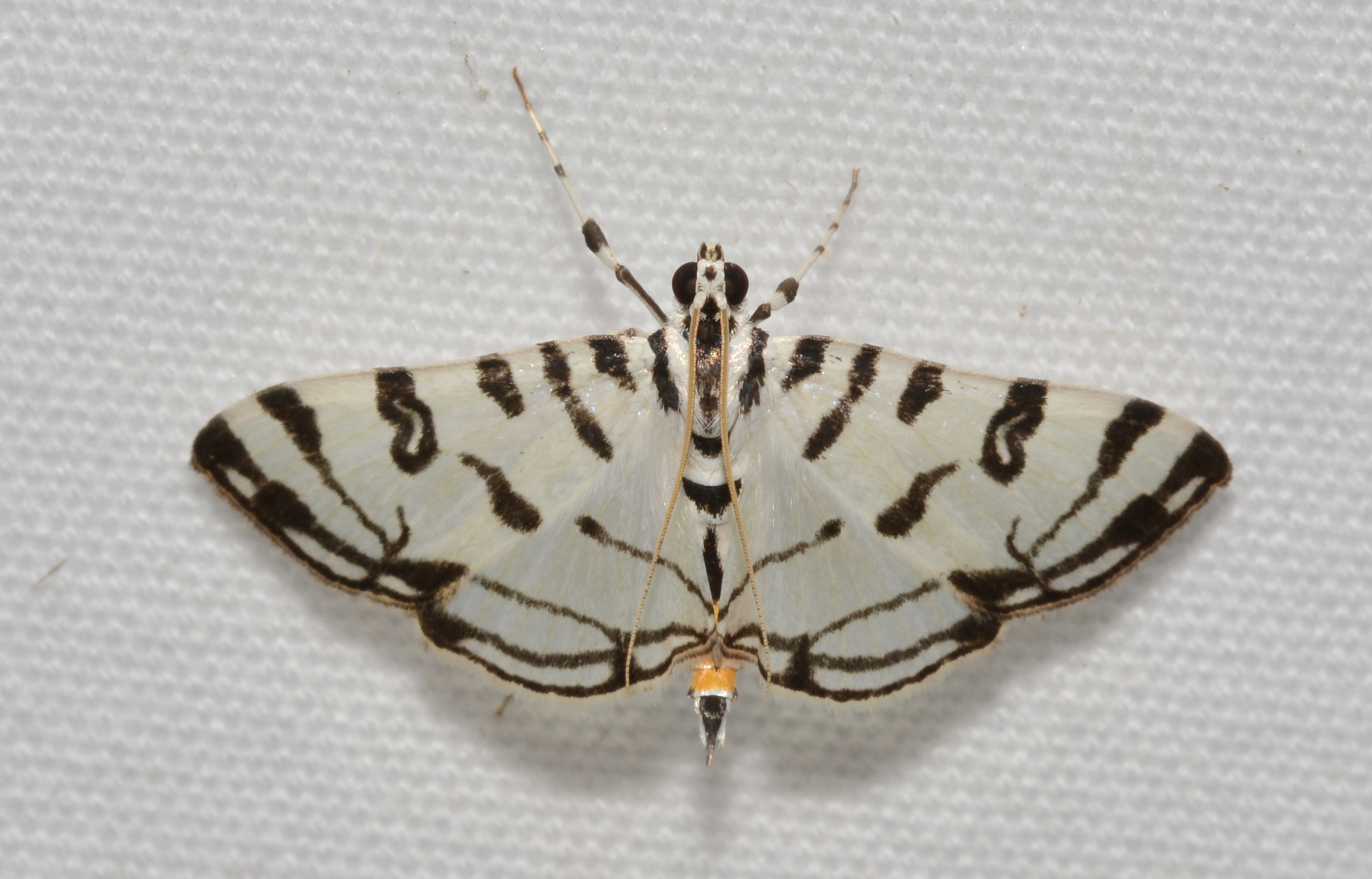

Scientific classification
- Kingdom: Animalia
- Phylum: Arthropoda
- Clade: Pancrustacea
- Class: Insecta
- Order: Lepidoptera
- Family: Crambidae
- Genus: Conchylodes
- Species: C. platinalis

Binomial name
- Conchylodes platinalis (Guenée, 1854)

Synonyms
- Spilomela platinalis Guenée, 1854; Zebronia erminea C. Felder, R. Felder & Rogenhofer, 1875

= Conchylodes platinalis =

Species of moth

Conchylodes platinalis is a moth in the family Crambidae. It was described by Achille Guenée in 1854. It is native to Central and South America, where it has been recorded from Venezuela, Belize, Costa Rica and Honduras. This species may be identified from the triangular-like wedges present in the margins of the fore and hindwings along with the noncontinuous post-medial band which is found mostly on C. ovulalis.
