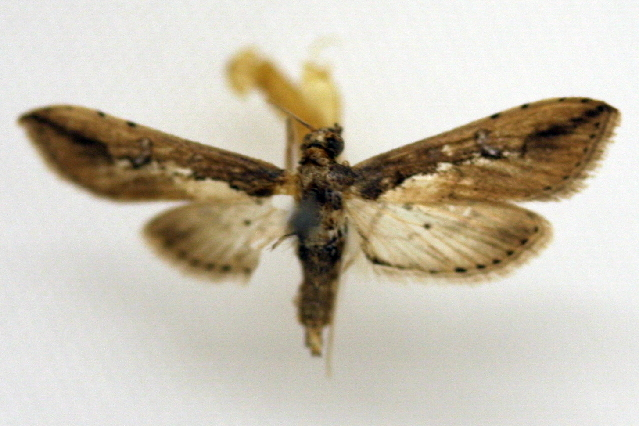

Scientific classification
- Kingdom: Animalia
- Phylum: Arthropoda
- Clade: Pancrustacea
- Class: Insecta
- Order: Lepidoptera
- Family: Crambidae
- Genus: Ercta
- Species: E. vittata

Binomial name
- Ercta vittata (Fabricius, 1794)

Synonyms
- Phalaena vittata Fabricius, 1794; Ercta tipulalis Walker, 1859; Euclasta torquillalis Möschler, 1890; Euclasta torquittalis; Lineodes valsaynalis Kaye, 1923; Stenia hemialis Guenée, 1854

= Ercta vittata =

Species of moth

Ercta vittata is a moth in the family Crambidae. It was described by Johan Christian Fabricius in 1794. It is found in the West Indies (Puerto Rico, Hispaniola, Jamaica, Cuba) and South America (including Trinidad and Brazil). It has also been recorded from Costa Rica and southern Florida.
