= Ercta pedicialis =

Scientific classification
- Kingdom: Animalia
- Phylum: Arthropoda
- Class: Insecta
- Order: Lepidoptera
- Family: Crambidae
- Genus: Ercta
- Species: E. pedicialis

Binomial name
- Ercta pedicialis Snellen, 1895

Species of moth

Ercta pedicialis is a moth in the family Crambidae. It was described by Snellen in 1895. It is found on Java.
