= Conchylodes vincentalis =

Scientific classification
- Kingdom: Animalia
- Phylum: Arthropoda
- Class: Insecta
- Order: Lepidoptera
- Family: Crambidae
- Genus: Conchylodes
- Species: C. vincentalis

Binomial name
- Conchylodes vincentalis Schaus, 1924

Species of moth

Conchylodes vincentalis is a moth in the family Crambidae. It was described by William Schaus in 1924. It is found in Bolivia.

The wingspan is about 21 mm. The forewings are white with black lines, a small medial annulus across the cell, a large annulus around the discocellular. The hindwings are white with a black point on the discocellular.
