= Conchylodes aquaticalis =

Scientific classification
- Kingdom: Animalia
- Phylum: Arthropoda
- Class: Insecta
- Order: Lepidoptera
- Family: Crambidae
- Genus: Conchylodes
- Species: C. aquaticalis

Binomial name
- Conchylodes aquaticalis (Guenée, 1854)

Synonyms
- Spilomela aquaticalis Guenée, 1854; Zebronia lacrinesalis Walker, 1859

Species of moth

Conchylodes aquaticalis is a moth in the family Crambidae. It was described by Achille Guenée in 1854. It is found in Brazil.
