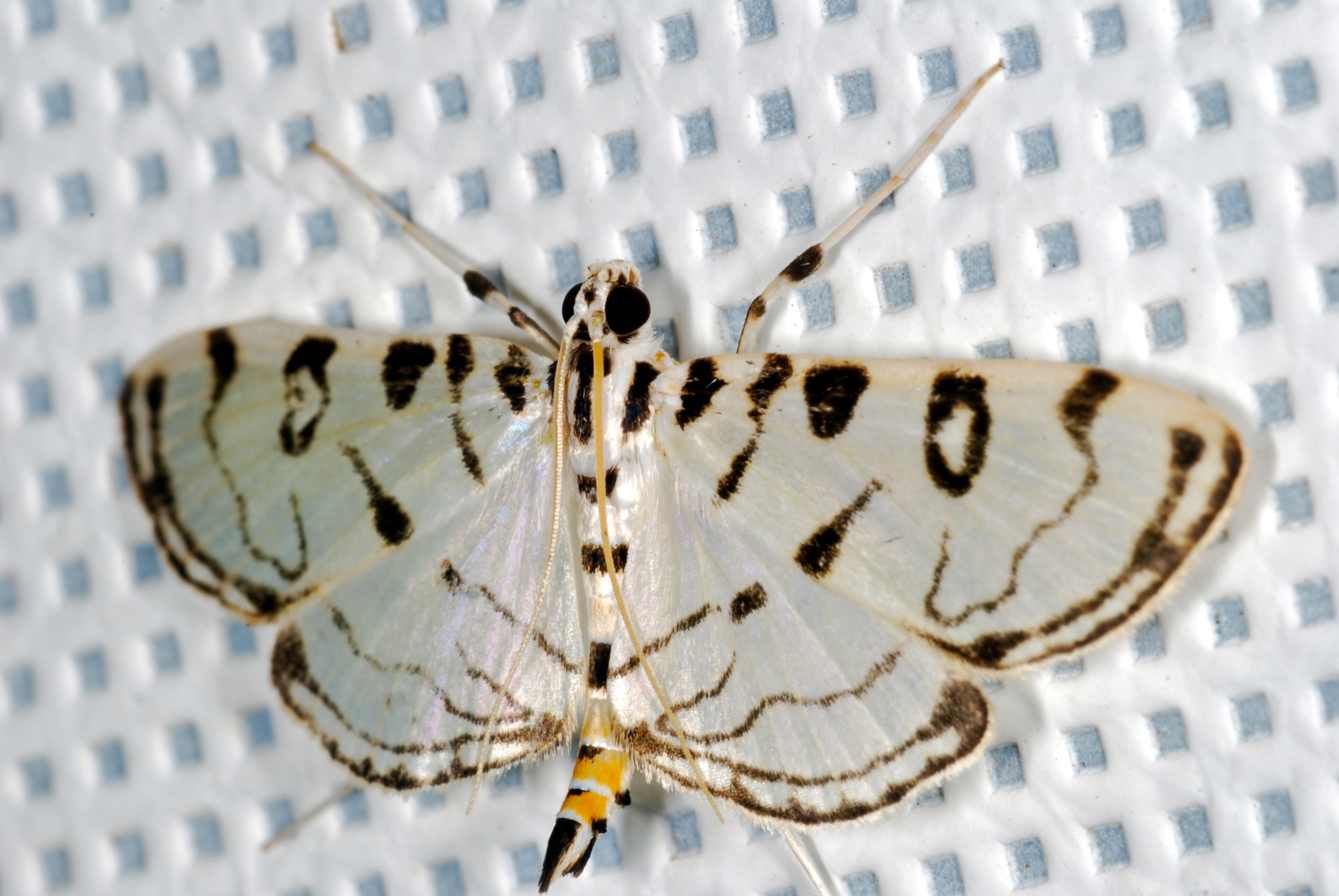
- Conchylodes erinalis

Scientific classification
- Kingdom: Animalia
- Phylum: Arthropoda
- Clade: Pancrustacea
- Class: Insecta
- Order: Lepidoptera
- Family: Crambidae
- Genus: Conchylodes
- Species: C. erinalis

Binomial name
- Conchylodes erinalis (Walker, 1859)

Synonyms
- Zebronia erinalis Walker, 1859; Phalaena Pyralis argentalis Stoll in Cramer & Stoll, 1781; Zebronia magicalis C. Felder, R. Felder & Rogenhofer, 1875

= Conchylodes erinalis =

Species of moth

Conchylodes erinalis is a moth in the family Crambidae. It was described by Francis Walker in 1859. It is found in South and Central America, including Mexico, Panama, Costa Rica, Belize and Venezuela.
