= Ercta trichoneura =

Scientific classification
- Kingdom: Animalia
- Phylum: Arthropoda
- Class: Insecta
- Order: Lepidoptera
- Family: Crambidae
- Genus: Ercta
- Species: E. trichoneura

Binomial name
- Ercta trichoneura Hampson, 1912

Synonyms
- Pardomima novalis Druce, 1895

Species of moth

Ercta trichoneura is a moth in the family Crambidae. It was described by George Hampson in 1912. It is found in Panama.
