= Tournefortia obtusiflora =

Conservation status
- Critically endangered, possibly extinct (IUCN 3.1)

Scientific classification
- Kingdom: Plantae
- Clade: Tracheophytes
- Clade: Angiosperms
- Clade: Eudicots
- Clade: Asterids
- Order: Boraginales
- Family: Boraginaceae
- Genus: Tournefortia
- Species: T. obtusiflora

Binomial name
- Tournefortia obtusiflora Benth.

Species of plant

Tournefortia obtusiflora is a species of plant in the family Boraginaceae. It is endemic to Ecuador. Its natural habitat is subtropical or tropical dry forests. It is threatened by habitat loss.
