= Conchylodes nissenalis =

Scientific classification
- Kingdom: Animalia
- Phylum: Arthropoda
- Class: Insecta
- Order: Lepidoptera
- Family: Crambidae
- Genus: Conchylodes
- Species: C. nissenalis

Binomial name
- Conchylodes nissenalis (Schaus, 1924)

Synonyms
- Aulacodes nissenalis Schaus, 1924

Species of moth

Conchylodes nissenalis is a moth in the family Crambidae described by William Schaus in 1924. It is found in Peru.

The wingspan is about 19 mm. The wings are white with fine tawny-olive markings. There is a point at the base of the costa of the forewings, as well as a subbasal oblique line on the costa and a point beyond in the cell and a point below it. The antemedial line runs from the cell to the inner margin and there is a large annulus in the cell and on the discocellular. There is a medial lunule below the cell and various streaks on the veins. The hindwings have antemedial and medial wavy lines and a line between them in the cell.
