= Conchylodes bryophilalis =

Scientific classification
- Kingdom: Animalia
- Phylum: Arthropoda
- Class: Insecta
- Order: Lepidoptera
- Family: Crambidae
- Genus: Conchylodes
- Species: C. bryophilalis

Binomial name
- Conchylodes bryophilalis Hampson, 1899

Species of moth

Conchylodes bryophilalis is a moth in the family Crambidae. It was described by George Hampson in 1899. It is found in Ecuador.

The wingspan is about 36 mm. The forewings are yellowish white with a triangular black subbasal costal mark followed by some rufous. The antemedial band is black and there is a medial triangular costal mark and a large patch beyond the middle, enclosing two white discocellular spots. There are black patches and spots on the outer margin. The hindwings are white with black specks, a fuscous apical patch and a black marginal mark.
