= Conchylodes hebraealis =

Scientific classification
- Kingdom: Animalia
- Phylum: Arthropoda
- Class: Insecta
- Order: Lepidoptera
- Family: Crambidae
- Genus: Conchylodes
- Species: C. hebraealis

Binomial name
- Conchylodes hebraealis Guenée, 1854

Species of moth

Conchylodes hebraealis is a moth in the family Crambidae. It is found in Haiti.
