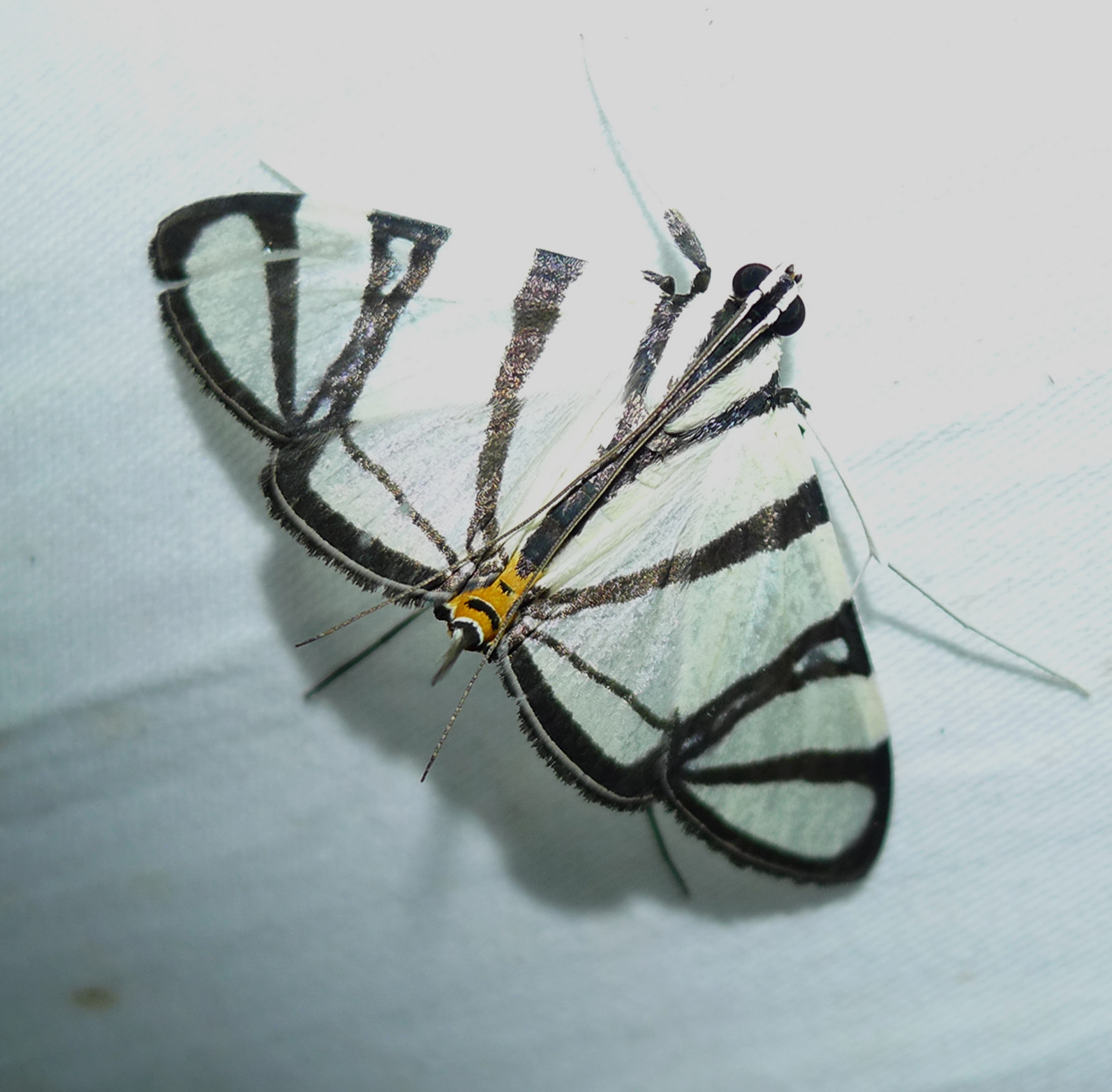

Scientific classification
- Kingdom: Animalia
- Phylum: Arthropoda
- Class: Insecta
- Order: Lepidoptera
- Family: Crambidae
- Genus: Conchylodes
- Species: C. nolckenialis

Binomial name
- Conchylodes nolckenialis (Snellen, 1875)

Synonyms
- Lederia nolckenialis Snellen, 1875; Conchylodes nolkenialis

= Conchylodes nolckenialis =

Species of moth

Conchylodes nolckenialis is a moth in the family Crambidae. It was described by Snellen in 1875. It is found in Colombia. It has also been recorded from Honduras.
