= Conchylodes terminipuncta =

Scientific classification
- Kingdom: Animalia
- Phylum: Arthropoda
- Class: Insecta
- Order: Lepidoptera
- Family: Crambidae
- Genus: Conchylodes
- Species: C. terminipuncta

Binomial name
- Conchylodes terminipuncta Hampson, 1912

Species of moth

Conchylodes terminipuncta is a moth in the family Crambidae. It was described by George Hampson in 1912. It is found in Tabasco, Mexico. It is most easily identifiable through the distinct submarginal area patterns of the fore and hindwing, exhibiting a checkered pattern of minuscule triangular wedges, easily distinguishing it from other Conchylodes species.
