= Sisyracera subulalis =

Scientific classification
- Kingdom: Animalia
- Phylum: Arthropoda
- Class: Insecta
- Order: Lepidoptera
- Family: Crambidae
- Genus: Sisyracera
- Species: S. subulalis

Binomial name
- Sisyracera subulalis (Guenée, 1854)

Synonyms
- Endotricha subulalis Guenée, 1854; Araschnopsis pretiosalis; Nacoleia subulalis; Leucinodes preciosalis Möschler, 1882

Species of moth

Sisyracera subulalis is a moth in the family Crambidae. It was described by Achille Guenée in 1854. It is found on the West Indies (including Jamaica and Cuba) and from Florida and Texas, through Mexico, Honduras and Costa Rica to Ecuador, Suriname and Brazil.

The wingspan is about 17–20 mm. Adults are on wing from September to November in the United States.
