= Tanaophysa rufiscripta =

Scientific classification
- Kingdom: Animalia
- Phylum: Arthropoda
- Class: Insecta
- Order: Lepidoptera
- Family: Crambidae
- Genus: Tanaophysa
- Species: T. rufiscripta

Binomial name
- Tanaophysa rufiscripta (Hampson, 1913)

Synonyms
- Sameodes rufiscripta Hampson, 1913

Species of moth

Tanaophysa rufiscripta is a moth in the family Crambidae. It was described by George Hampson in 1913. It is found in Peru.

The moth is about 32 mm. The forewings are yellow, the costal area and inner margin bright rufous and the antemedial line rufous, oblique to vein 1, then incurved. There is a rufous spot in the middle of the cell and an oblique discoidal bar. The postmedial line is brown, crenulate, bent outwards below vein 5, then oblique and ending at vein 2. The terminal line is rufous. The hindwings are yellow with a pale brown postmedial line, slightly angled outwards below vein 5, then slightly waved to vein 2, where it is bent inwards to below the end of the cell and not reaching the inner margin. There is a rufous terminal line.
