= Ercta scotialis =

Scientific classification
- Kingdom: Animalia
- Phylum: Arthropoda
- Class: Insecta
- Order: Lepidoptera
- Family: Crambidae
- Genus: Ercta
- Species: E. scotialis

Binomial name
- Ercta scotialis Hampson, 1912

Species of moth

Ercta scotialis is a moth in the family Crambidae. It was described by George Hampson in 1912. It is found in Zimbabwe.
