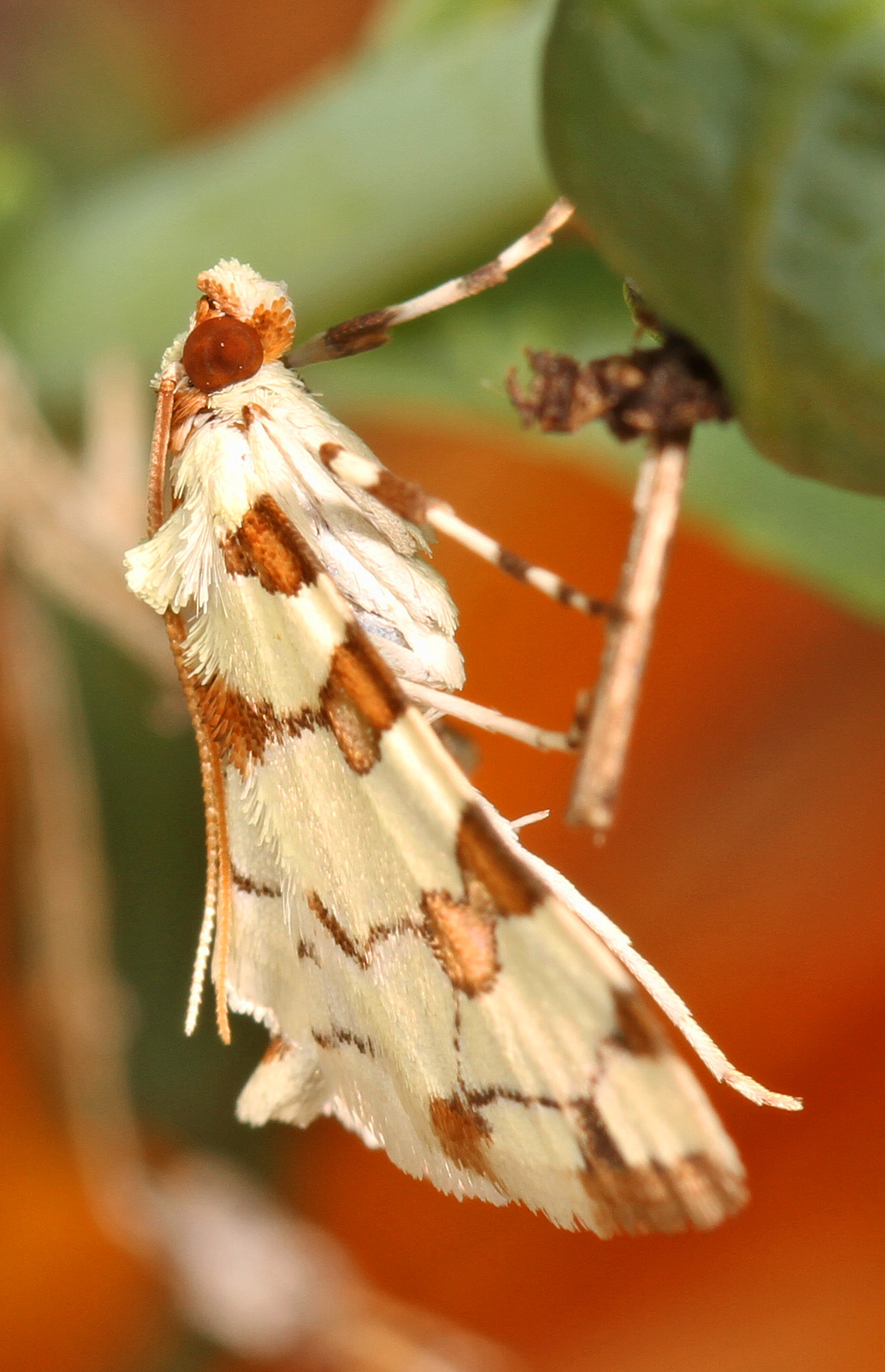

Scientific classification
- Kingdom: Animalia
- Phylum: Arthropoda
- Clade: Pancrustacea
- Class: Insecta
- Order: Lepidoptera
- Family: Crambidae
- Genus: Conchylodes
- Species: C. octonalis

Binomial name
- Conchylodes octonalis (Zeller, 1873)

Synonyms
- Orobena octonalis Zeller, 1873; Botis sexmaculalis Grote, 1876

= Conchylodes octonalis =

Eight-barred lygropia moth

Species of moth

Conchylodes octonalis, the eight-barred lygropia moth, is a snout moth in the family Crambidae. It was described by Zeller in 1873. It is found in North America, where it has been recorded from central and southern California to Texas and from Iowa, Mississippi, Nevada, New Mexico, Oklahoma and Tennessee. The habitat consists of low-elevation arid areas.

The length of the forewings is 7.5–8.5 mm. Adults are on wing from late March to October.

The larvae have been recorded feeding on Heliotropium curassavicum.
