= Conchylodes concinnalis =

Scientific classification
- Kingdom: Animalia
- Phylum: Arthropoda
- Class: Insecta
- Order: Lepidoptera
- Family: Crambidae
- Genus: Conchylodes
- Species: C. concinnalis

Binomial name
- Conchylodes concinnalis Hampson, 1898

Species of moth

Conchylodes concinnalis is a moth in the family Crambidae. It is found in Mexico and the south-eastern United States north to Ohio. In the west, the range extends to Arizona and southern California.

The wingspan is about 23–24 mm. The wings are cretaceous white. There are black subbasals and antemedial bands on the forewings, as well as a pot in the cell with a small white center. There is a larger discocellular spot with a much larger center. There is a nearly straight submarginal and marginal line. Adults are on wing from March to September.
