= Conchylodes zebra =

Scientific classification
- Kingdom: Animalia
- Phylum: Arthropoda
- Class: Insecta
- Order: Lepidoptera
- Family: Crambidae
- Genus: Conchylodes
- Species: C. zebra

Binomial name
- Conchylodes zebra (Sepp, 1850)

Synonyms
- Phalaena zebra Sepp, 1850; Spilomela striginalis Guenée, 1854

Species of moth

Conchylodes zebra is a moth in the family Crambidae. It was described by Sepp in 1850. It is found in Suriname and French Guiana.
