= Tanaophysa adornatalis =

Scientific classification
- Kingdom: Animalia
- Phylum: Arthropoda
- Class: Insecta
- Order: Lepidoptera
- Family: Crambidae
- Genus: Tanaophysa
- Species: T. adornatalis

Binomial name
- Tanaophysa adornatalis Warren, 1892

Species of moth

Tanaophysa adornatalis is a moth in the family Crambidae. It was described by Warren in 1892. It is found in Brazil (São Paulo).

The wingspan is about 32 mm for females and 21 mm for males. The forewings are bright yellow, brownish along the costa, especially towards the base. There is an indistinct obliquely curved first line near the base and another exterior of the ordinary shape. There is also a small dot in the cell near the first line and a larger one at the end of the cell. The hindwings are similar to the forewings, with the exterior line repeated.
