= Sisyracera inabsconsalis =

Scientific classification
- Domain: Eukaryota
- Kingdom: Animalia
- Phylum: Arthropoda
- Class: Insecta
- Order: Lepidoptera
- Family: Crambidae
- Genus: Sisyracera
- Species: S. inabsconsalis

Binomial name
- Sisyracera inabsconsalis (Möschler, 1890)

Synonyms
- Diasemia inabsconsalis Möschler, 1890

Species of moth

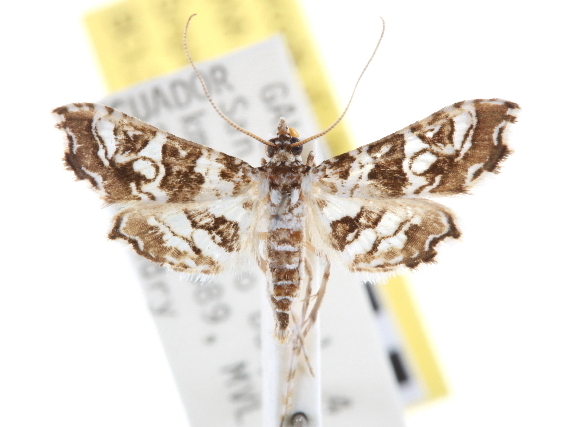
Sisyracera inabsconsalis

Sisyracera inabsconsalis is a moth in the family Crambidae. It was described by Heinrich Benno Möschler in 1890. It is found on Puerto Rico and Cuba.
