= Udeoides =

Scientific classification
- Kingdom: Animalia
- Phylum: Arthropoda
- Class: Insecta
- Order: Lepidoptera
- Family: Crambidae
- Tribe: Udeini
- Genus: Udeoides; Maes, 2006

Genus of moths

Udeoides is a genus of snout moths of the subfamily Spilomelinae in the family Crambidae. The genus was described by Koen Maes in 2006 and distinguished from the related genus Udea. All six species are distributed in the Afrotropical realm.

== Species ==
- Udeoides bonakandaiensis Maes, 2006
- Udeoides invaginalis Maes, 2019
- Udeoides muscosalis (Hampson, 1913)
- Udeoides nigribasalis (Hampson, 1913)
- Udeoides nolalis (C. Felder, R. Felder & Rogenhofer, 1875)
- Udeoides viridis Maes, 2006
