= Udeoides nolalis =

Scientific classification
- Kingdom: Animalia
- Phylum: Arthropoda
- Class: Insecta
- Order: Lepidoptera
- Family: Crambidae
- Genus: Udeoides
- Species: U. nolalis

Binomial name
- Udeoides nolalis (C. Felder, R. Felder & Rogenhofer, 1875)

Synonyms
- Scoparia nolalis C. Felder, R. Felder & Rogenhofer, 1875

Species of moth

Udeoides nolalis is a moth in the family Crambidae. It was described by Cajetan Felder, Rudolf Felder and Alois Friedrich Rogenhofer in 1875. It is found in Kenya and South Africa.
