= Udeoides nigribasalis =

Scientific classification
- Kingdom: Animalia
- Phylum: Arthropoda
- Class: Insecta
- Order: Lepidoptera
- Family: Crambidae
- Genus: Udeoides
- Species: U. nigribasalis

Binomial name
- Udeoides nigribasalis (Hampson, 1913)

Synonyms
- Pionea nigribasalis Hampson, 1913

Species of moth

Udeoides nigribasalis is a moth in the family Crambidae. It was described by George Hampson in 1913. It is found in Kenya.

The wingspan is about 18 mm. The forewings are greyish, the basal area strongly suffused with black, the rest of the wing with red-brown. The basal area is bounded by a slight pale somewhat incurved antemedial line, strongly defined by black on the outer side. There is a pale discoidal spot defined by brown, rounded above and acuminate below with a semi-circular black mark above it on the costa. The postmedial line is black, dilated into a spot on the costa, oblique to vein 6, then inwardly oblique and waved, at vein 3 retracted to below the angle of the cell, then again excurved and with some deep brown suffusion beyond it on the costal area and from the middle to the inner margin. There is a subterminal black spot above the middle and some black points on the costa towards the apex and a terminal series with blackish spot at the apex. The hindwings are greyish, suffused with fuscous brown, the apical part of the terminal area darker and with an indistinct curved postmedial line.
