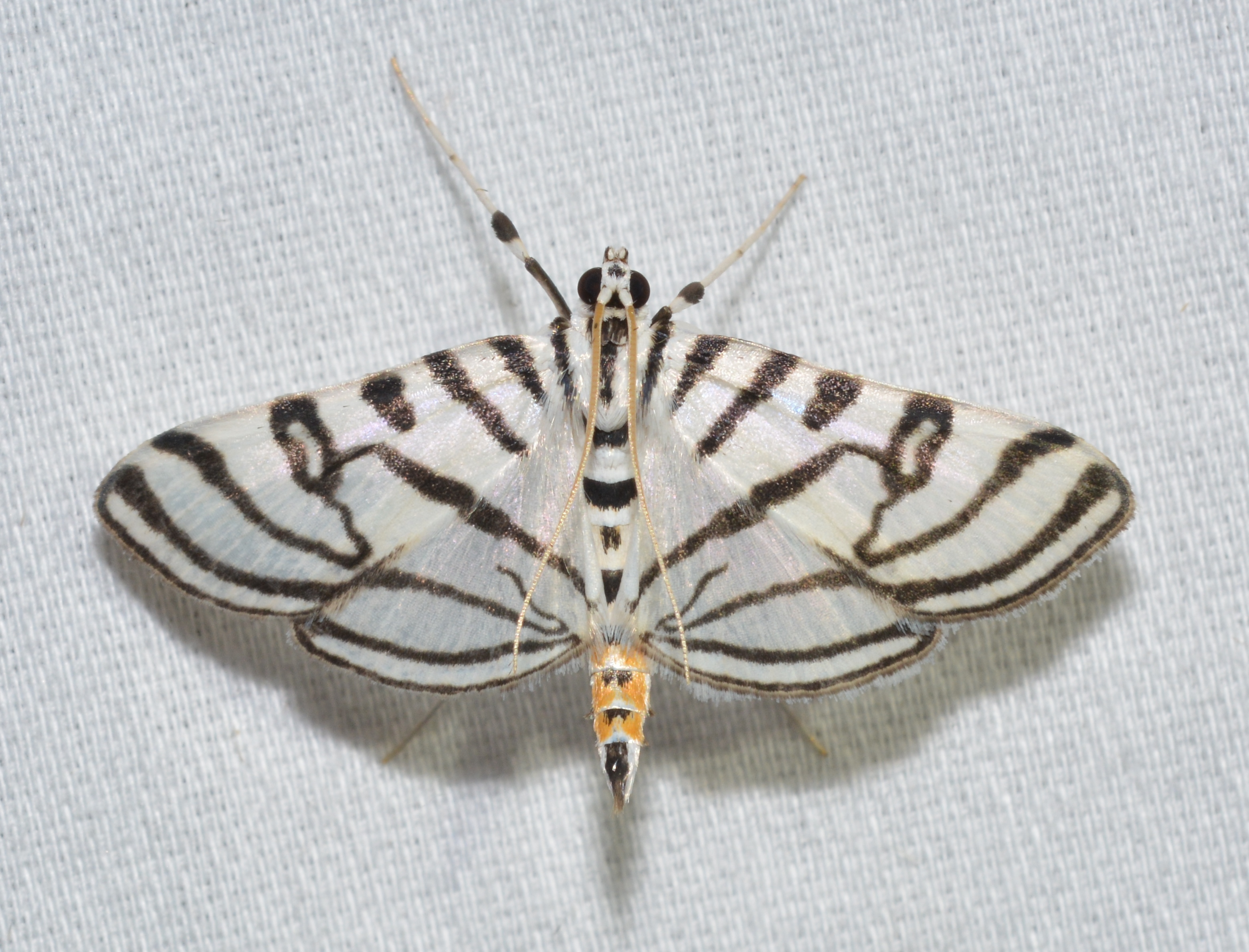
- Conchylodes ovulalis

Scientific classification
- Kingdom: Animalia
- Phylum: Arthropoda
- Clade: Pancrustacea
- Class: Insecta
- Order: Lepidoptera
- Family: Crambidae
- Tribe: Udeini
- Genus: Conchylodes; Guenée, 1854

Synonyms
- Ledereria Snellen, 1873; Nonazochis Amsel, 1956

= Conchylodes =

Genus of moths

Conchylodes is a genus of snout moths in the family Crambidae. The genus comprises 21 species and is placed in the tribe Udeini.

Recently, the monotypic genus Nonazochis, described by Hans Georg Amsel in 1956, was synonymized with Conchylodes. This led to the transfer of its type species, Azochis graphialis, to Conchylodes as Conchylodes graphialis.

== Species ==
- Conchylodes aquaticalis (Guenée, 1854)
- Conchylodes arcifera Hampson, 1912
- Conchylodes bryophilalis Hampson, 1899
- Conchylodes concinnalis Hampson, 1899
- Conchylodes diphteralis (Geyer in Hübner, 1832)
- Conchylodes erinalis (Walker, 1859)
- Conchylodes gammaphora Hampson, 1912
- Conchylodes graphialis (Schaus, 1912)
- Conchylodes hebraealis Guenée, 1854
- Conchylodes hedonialis (Walker, 1859)
- Conchylodes intricata Hampson, 1912
- Conchylodes nissenalis (Schaus, 1924)
- Conchylodes nolckenialis (Snellen, 1875)
- Conchylodes octonalis (Zeller, 1873)
- Conchylodes ovulalis (Guenée, 1854)
- Conchylodes platinalis (Guenée, 1854)
- Conchylodes salamisalis Druce, 1895
- Conchylodes stictiperalis Hampson, 1912
- Conchylodes terminipuncta Hampson, 1912
- Conchylodes vincentalis Schaus, 1924
- Conchylodes zebra (Sepp, 1850)
