= Udeoides bonakandaiensis =

Scientific classification
- Kingdom: Animalia
- Phylum: Arthropoda
- Class: Insecta
- Order: Lepidoptera
- Family: Crambidae
- Genus: Udeoides
- Species: U. bonakandaiensis

Binomial name
- Udeoides bonakandaiensis Maes, 2006

Species of moth

Udeoides bonakandaiensis is a moth in the family Crambidae. It was described by Koen V. N. Maes in 2006. It is found in Cameroon.
