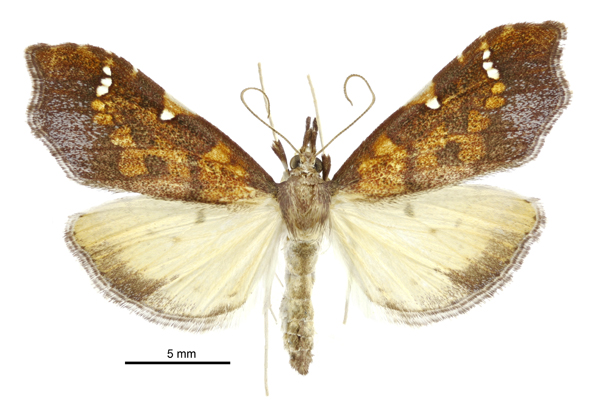
- Female
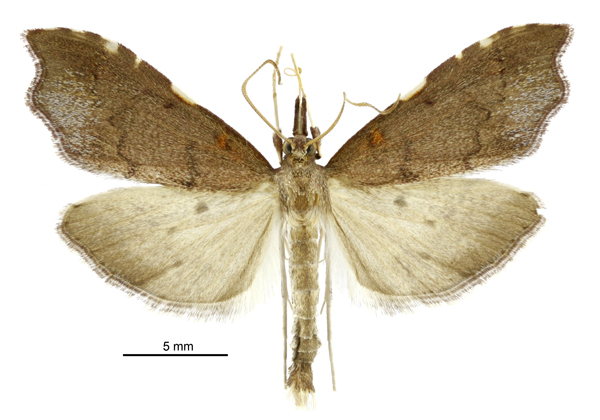
- Male

Scientific classification
- Kingdom: Animalia
- Phylum: Arthropoda
- Clade: Pancrustacea
- Class: Insecta
- Order: Lepidoptera
- Family: Crambidae
- Tribe: Udeini
- Genus: Deana; Butler, 1879
- Species: D. hybreasalis

Binomial name
- Deana hybreasalis (Walker, 1859)

Synonyms
- Generic; Adena Walker, 1863; Nesarcha Meyrick, 1884; Specific; Scopula hybreasalis Walker, 1859; Scopula pareonalis Walker, 1859; Adena xanthialis Walker, 1863; Nesarcha hybrealis (Walker, 1863)

= Deana =

Genus of moths

Deana is a monotypic genus of moths in the family Crambidae described by Arthur Gardiner Butler in 1859. It contains only one species, Deana hybreasalis, which is endemic to New Zealand.

The larvae feed on various liana species, including Clematis species (Ranunculaceae).

Adults are attracted to light and have been collected via a mercury vapour light trap.
