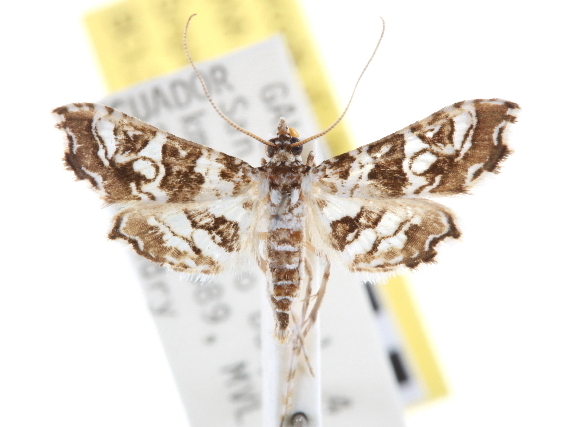

Scientific classification
- Kingdom: Animalia
- Phylum: Arthropoda
- Clade: Pancrustacea
- Class: Insecta
- Order: Lepidoptera
- Family: Crambidae
- Tribe: Udeini
- Genus: Sisyracera; Möschler, 1890

Synonyms
- Araschnopsis Amsel, 1956

= Sisyracera =

Genus of moths

Sisyracera is a genus of snout moths in the subfamily Spilomelinae of the family Crambidae. It was described in 1890 by Heinrich Benno Möschler with Leucinodes preciosalis as type species, now considered a synonym of Sisyracera subulalis. The genus has been placed in the tribe Udeini.

DNA barcode data for two species of Sisyracera are stored in the Barcode of Life Data System (BOLD), although only sequences for S. subulalis from specimens collected at the Area de Conservación Guanacaste in Costa Rica are publicly accessible.

== Species ==
- Sisyracera inabsconsalis (Möschler, 1890)
- Sisyracera jacquelinae B. Landry, 2016
- Sisyracera subulalis (Guenée, 1854)

== Former species ==
- Sisyracera contortilinealis (Hampson, 1895), now a synonym of Sisyracera inabsconsalis
- Sisyracera preciosalis (Möschler, 1881)
