= Conchylodes hedonialis =

Scientific classification
- Kingdom: Animalia
- Phylum: Arthropoda
- Class: Insecta
- Order: Lepidoptera
- Family: Crambidae
- Genus: Conchylodes
- Species: C. hedonialis

Binomial name
- Conchylodes hedonialis (Walker, 1859)

Synonyms
- Zebronia hedonialis Walker, 1859

Species of moth

Conchylodes hedonialis is a moth in the family Crambidae. It was described by Francis Walker in 1859. It is found in the Dominican Republic.
