= Ercta =

Scientific classification
- Kingdom: Animalia
- Phylum: Arthropoda
- Class: Insecta
- Order: Lepidoptera
- Family: Crambidae
- Subfamily: Spilomelinae
- Genus: Ercta; Walker, 1859

Synonyms
- Erota Walker, 1859

Genus of moths

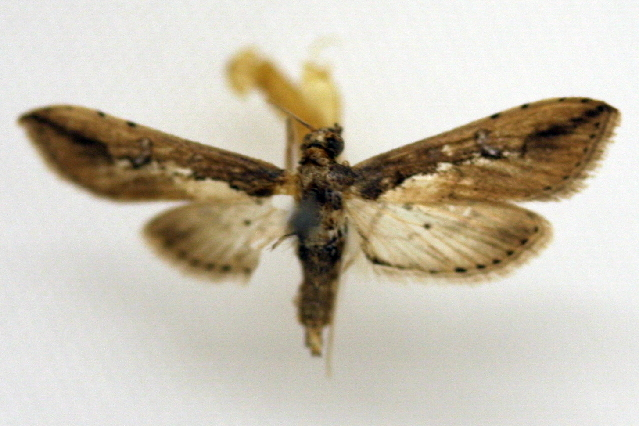
Ercta vittata

Ercta is a genus of moths of the family Crambidae.

== Species ==
- Ercta dixialis Snellen, 1895
- Ercta elutalis (Walker, 1859)
- Ercta pedicialis Snellen, 1895
- Ercta scotialis Hampson, 1912
- Ercta trichoneura Hampson, 1912
- Ercta vittata (Fabricius, 1794)
