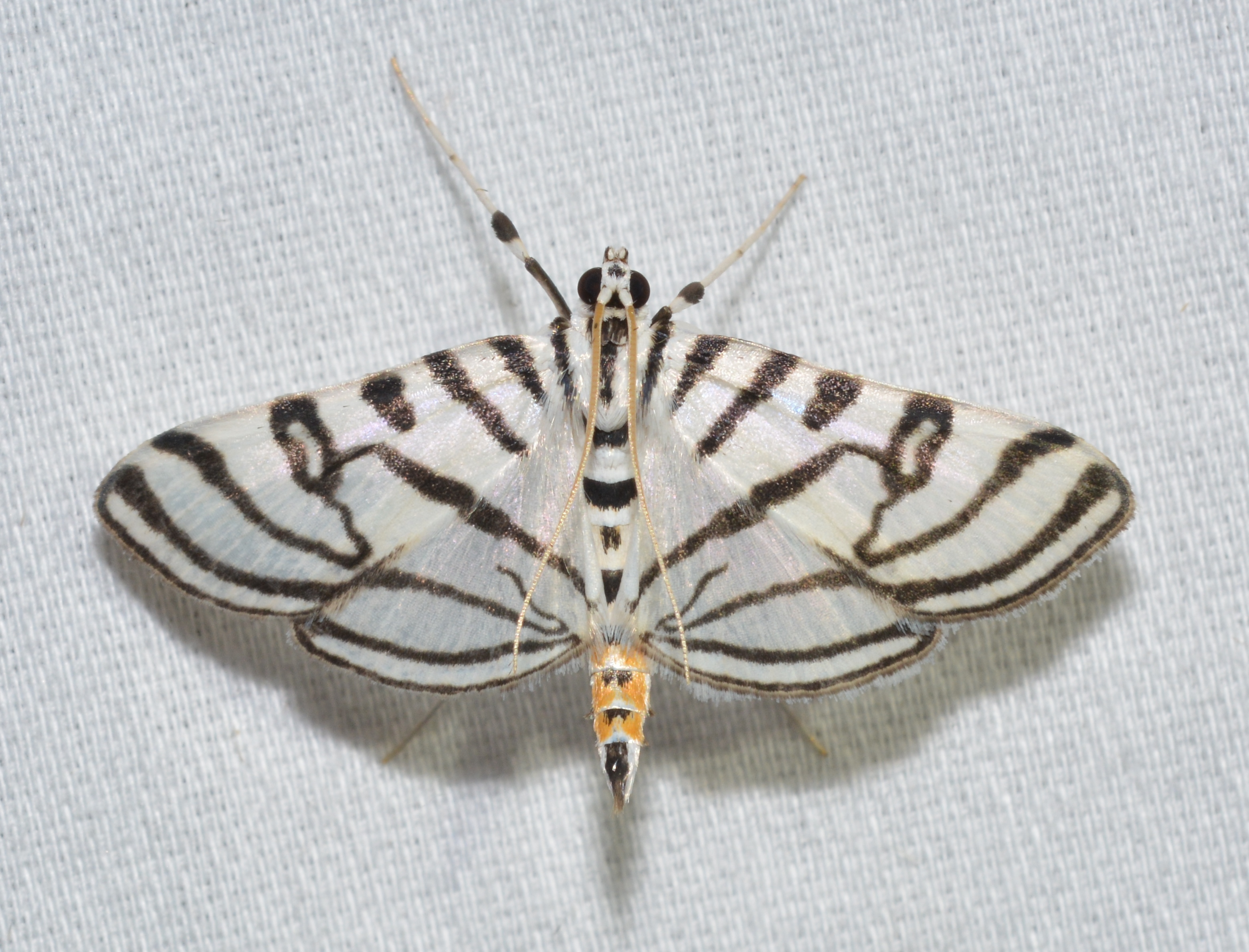

Scientific classification
- Kingdom: Animalia
- Phylum: Arthropoda
- Class: Insecta
- Order: Lepidoptera
- Family: Crambidae
- Genus: Conchylodes
- Species: C. ovulalis

Binomial name
- Conchylodes ovulalis (Guenée, 1854)

Synonyms
- Spilomela ovulalis Guenée, 1854

= Conchylodes ovulalis =

Zebra conchylodes moth

Species of moth

Conchylodes ovulalis, the zebra conchylodes moth, is a moth in the family Crambidae. It was described by Achille Guenée in 1854. It is found from the United States, where it has been recorded from Pennsylvania to Florida, west to Arizona, south through Mexico and Costa Rica to Colombia.

The wingspan is 23–30 mm. Adults are on wing from May to September in the United States.

The larvae feed on Asteraceae species.
