= Tanaophysa =

Scientific classification
- Kingdom: Animalia
- Phylum: Arthropoda
- Class: Insecta
- Order: Lepidoptera
- Family: Crambidae
- Subfamily: Spilomelinae
- Genus: Tanaophysa; Warren, 1892

Genus of moths

Tanaophysa is a genus of moths of the family Crambidae described by William Warren in 1892.

== Species ==
- Tanaophysa adornatalis Warren, 1892
- Tanaophysa rufiscripta (Hampson, 1913)
