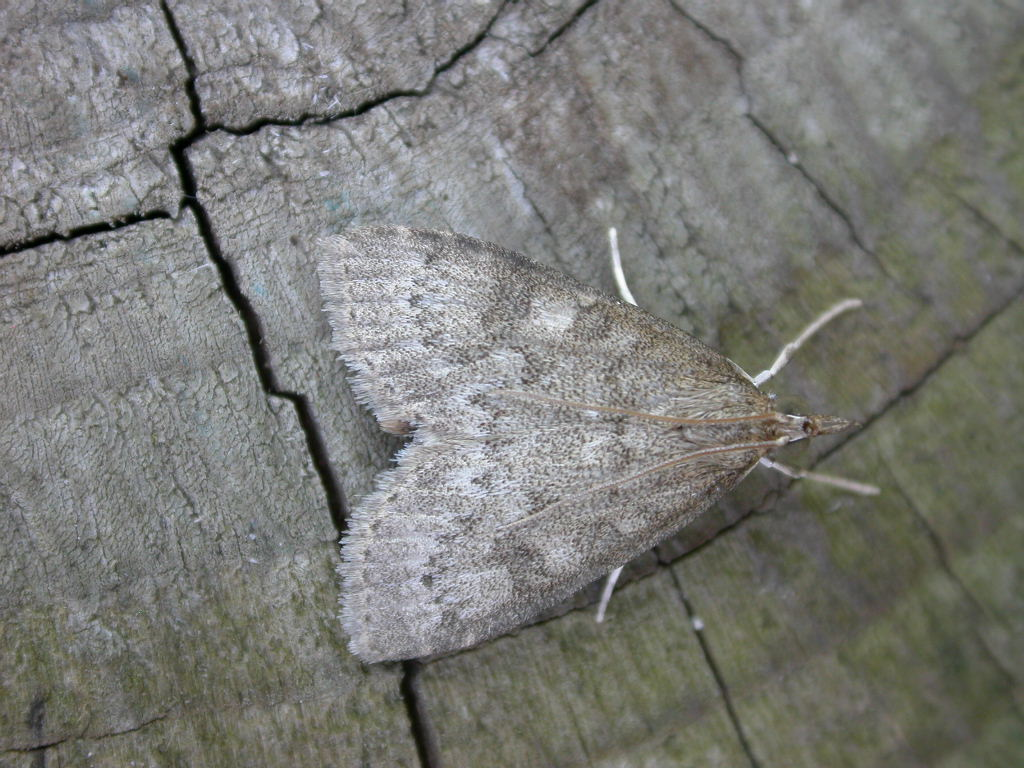
- Imago
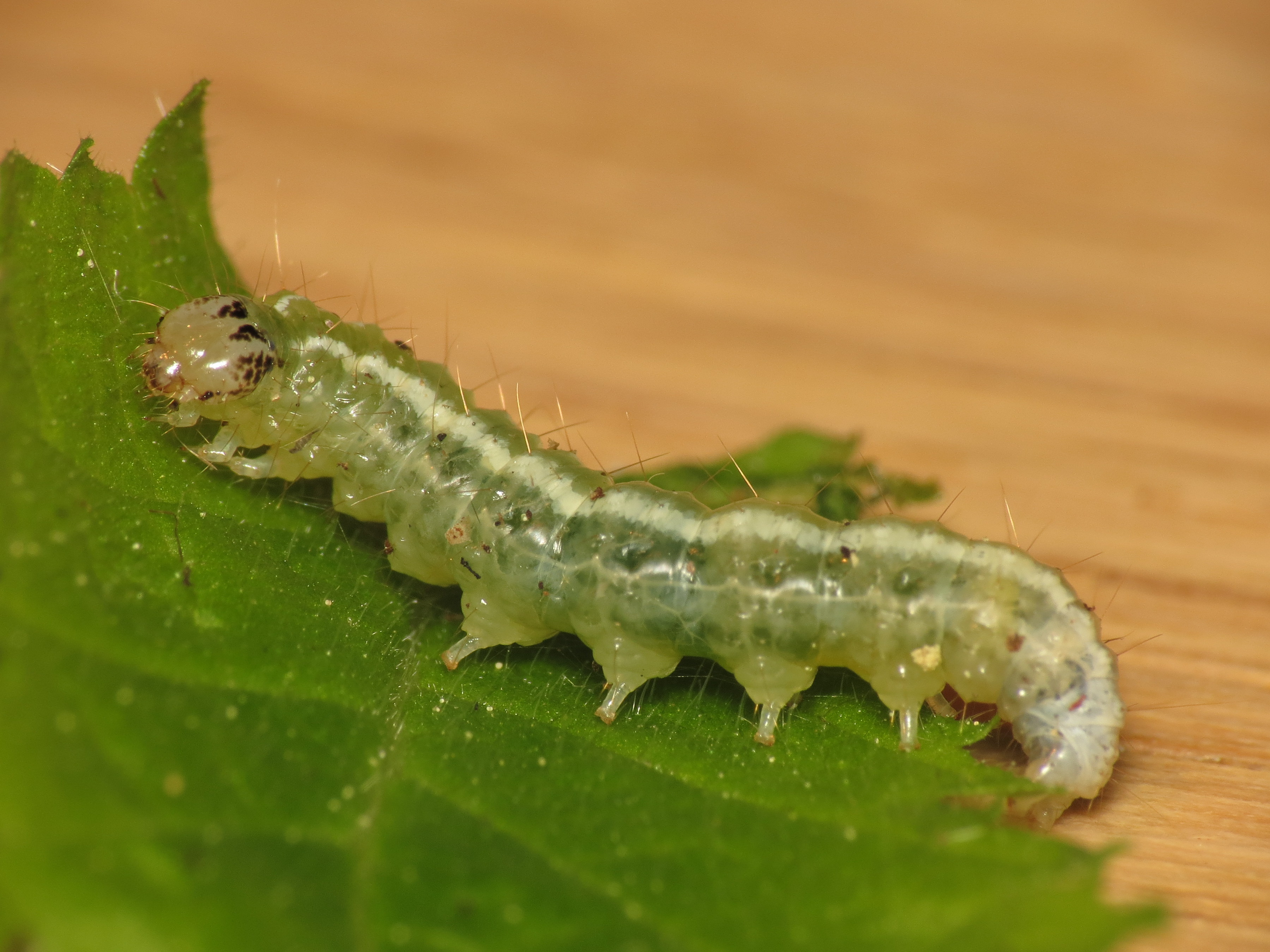
- Caterpillar on wych elm (Ulmus glabra)

Scientific classification
- Domain: Eukaryota
- Kingdom: Animalia
- Phylum: Arthropoda
- Class: Insecta
- Order: Lepidoptera
- Family: Crambidae
- Genus: Udea
- Species: U. prunalis

Binomial name
- Udea prunalis (Denis & Schiffermüller, 1775)

Synonyms
- Pyralis prunalis Denis & Schiffermüller, 1775; Pyralis ferruginalis Fabricius, 1781; Udea obscura Dufrane, 1955; Phalaena nivealis Fabricius, 1781; Phalaena Pyralis ferruginalis Villers, 1789; Pyralis leucophaealis Hübner, 1796

= Udea prunalis =

Species of moth

Udea prunalis is a moth of the family Crambidae. It is found in Europe and China (Gansu, Heilongjiang, Ningxia, Shanxi, Sichuan, Xinjiang). The species was first described by Matthew Denis and Ignaz Schiffermüller in 1775. In the Butterfly Conservation's Microlepidoptera Report 2011 this species was classified as common in the UK.

The wingspan is 23–26 mm. The forewings are fuscous-grey with a brownish base. The first line is indistinct, and the second is serrate, blackish, and curved, with a narrow deep sinuation inwards below middle, on dorsum whitish-edged posteriorly. The orbicular and 8-shaped discal spots are darker grey, and the costa posteriorly is spotted darker and sometimes whitish. The hindwings are fuscous-grey, apex darker with two dark fuscous discal dots and a faint second line. The larva is bright deep green with a subdorsal line shining white and a grey-whitish head.

The moth flies from June to August depending on location.

The larvae feed on various herbaceous plants, shrubs and deciduous trees.
