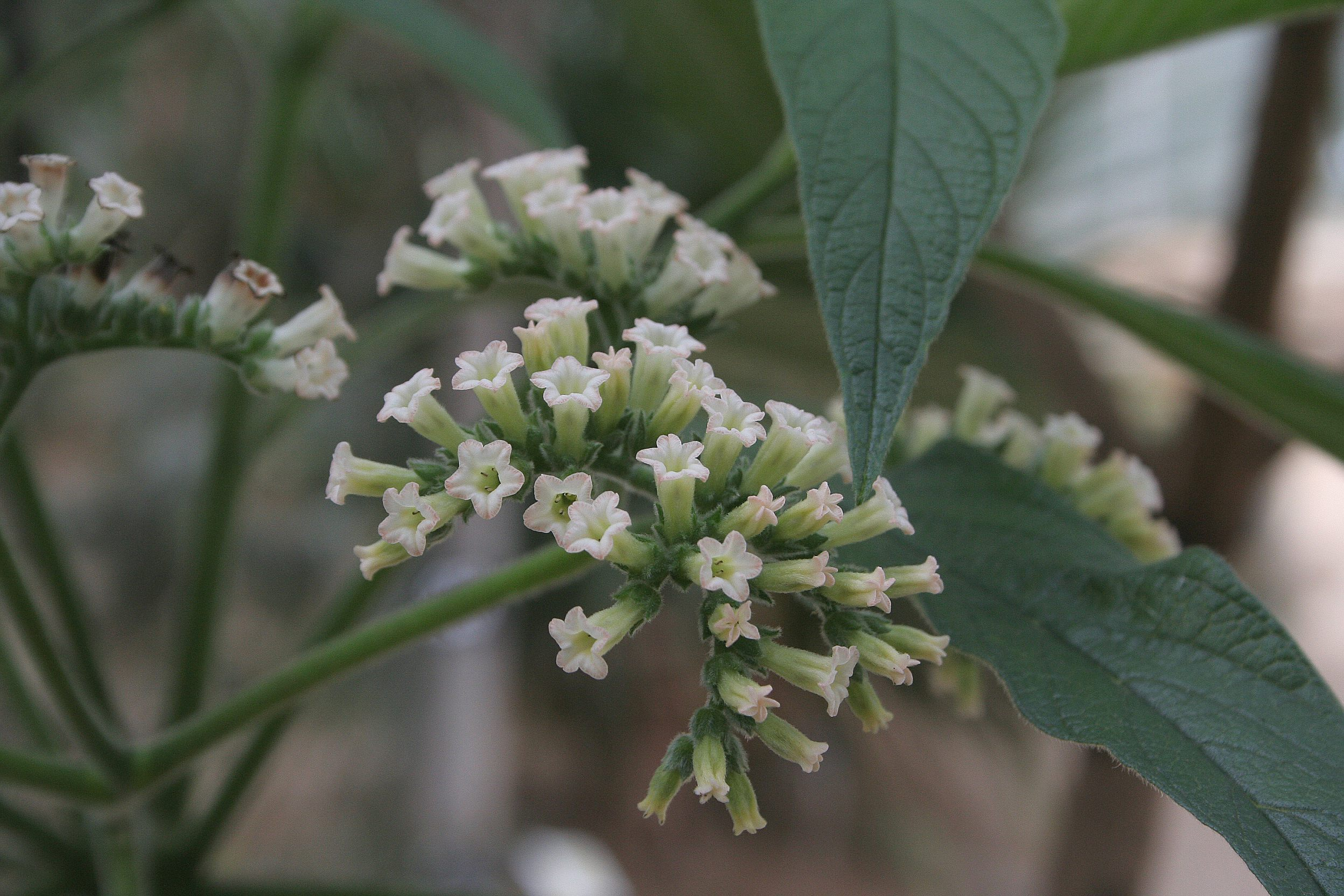
- Tournefortia bojeri

Scientific classification
- Kingdom: Plantae
- Clade: Tracheophytes
- Clade: Angiosperms
- Clade: Eudicots
- Clade: Asterids
- Order: Boraginales
- Family: Boraginaceae
- Subfamily: Heliotropioideae
- Genus: Tournefortia; L.

Type species
- Tournefortia hirsutissima L.

Synonyms
- Argusia Boehm.; Arguzia Raf.; Mallotonia Britton; Messerschmidia L. ex Hebenstr.; Spilocarpus Lem.

= Tournefortia =

Genus of flowering plants in the borage family Boraginaceae

Tournefortia, often called soldierbushes, is a genus of flowering plants in the borage family, Boraginaceae.

It was first published under the name "Pittonia" by Charles Plumier in 1703, in honour of Joseph Pitton de Tournefort, Carl Linnaeus changed the name to Tournefortia, on the grounds that Tournefort was virtually unknown by his family name outside France.

== Species ==
The following species are accepted:

- Tournefortia albifolia J.S.Mill.
- Tournefortia belizensis Lundell
- Tournefortia bojeri A.DC.
- Tournefortia brantii J.S.Mill.
- Tournefortia buchtienii Killip
- Tournefortia caeciliana Loes.
- Tournefortia calycina Benth.
- Tournefortia candida (M.Martens & Galeotti) Walp.
- Tournefortia canescens Kunth
- Tournefortia capitata M.Martens & Galeotti
- Tournefortia caracasana Kunth
- Tournefortia chinchensis Killip
- Tournefortia chrysantha (M.Martens & Galeotti) Walp.
- Tournefortia conocarpa Urb.
- Tournefortia cordifolia André
- Tournefortia coriacea Vaupel
- Tournefortia curvilimba Killip
- Tournefortia delicatula J.S.Mill.
- Tournefortia densiflora M.Martens & Galeotti
- Tournefortia dracophylla K.Schum. & Lauterb.
- Tournefortia elongata D.N.Gibson
- Tournefortia fruticosa Ortega
- Tournefortia gnaphalodes (L.) R.Br. ex Roem. & Schult.
- Tournefortia hartwegiana Steud.
- Tournefortia hernandesii Dunal ex A.DC.
- Tournefortia heyneana Wall. ex G.Don
- Tournefortia hookeri C.B.Clarke
- Tournefortia intonsa Kerr
- Tournefortia johnstonii Standl.
- Tournefortia khasiana C.B.Clarke
- Tournefortia killipii Nowicke
- Tournefortia kirkii (I.M.Johnst.) J.S.Mill.
- Tournefortia latisepala Nowicke
- Tournefortia longifolia Ruiz & Pav.
- Tournefortia longiloba D.N.Gibson
- Tournefortia longipedicellata J.S.Mill.
- Tournefortia longispica J.S.Mill.
- Tournefortia macrostachya Rusby
- Tournefortia mexicana Vatke
- Tournefortia microcalyx (Ruiz & Pav.) I.M.Johnst.
- Tournefortia montana Lour.
- Tournefortia multiflora J.S.Mill.
- Tournefortia mutabilis Vent.
- Tournefortia obtusiflora Benth.
- Tournefortia ovalifolia Rusby
- Tournefortia ovata Wall. ex G.Don
- Tournefortia pedicellata D.L.Nash
- Tournefortia polystachya Ruiz & Pav.
- Tournefortia puberula Baker
- Tournefortia pubescens Hook.f.
- Tournefortia ramonensis Standl.
- Tournefortia ramosissima K.Krause
- Tournefortia restrepoae J.S.Mill.
- Tournefortia rufosericea Hook.f.
- Tournefortia schiedeana G.Don
- Tournefortia setacea Killip
- Tournefortia stenosepala K.Krause
- Tournefortia subspicata Donn.Sm.
- Tournefortia subtropica (C.B.Clarke) S.P.Banerjee
- Tournefortia tacarcunensis A.H.Gentry & Nowicke
- Tournefortia tarmensis (K.Krause) J.F.Macbr.
- Tournefortia ternifolia Kunth
- Tournefortia trichocalycina A.DC.
- Tournefortia umbellata Kunth
- Tournefortia undulata Ruiz & Pav.
- Tournefortia urceolata J.S.Mill.
- Tournefortia usambarensis (Verdc.) Verdc.
- Tournefortia vasquezii J.S.Mill.
- Tournefortia vestita Killip
- Tournefortia virgata Ruiz & Pav.
- Tournefortia walkerae C.B.Clarke
- Tournefortia wightii C.B.Clarke
