= Tournefortia rufosericea =

Conservation status
- Vulnerable (IUCN 2.3)

Scientific classification
- Kingdom: Plantae
- Clade: Tracheophytes
- Clade: Angiosperms
- Clade: Eudicots
- Clade: Asterids
- Order: Boraginales
- Family: Boraginaceae
- Genus: Tournefortia
- Species: T. rufosericea

Binomial name
- Tournefortia rufosericea Hook.f.

Species of plant

Tournefortia rufosericea is a species of soldierbush plant in the family Boraginaceae. It is endemic to the Galápagos Islands.
