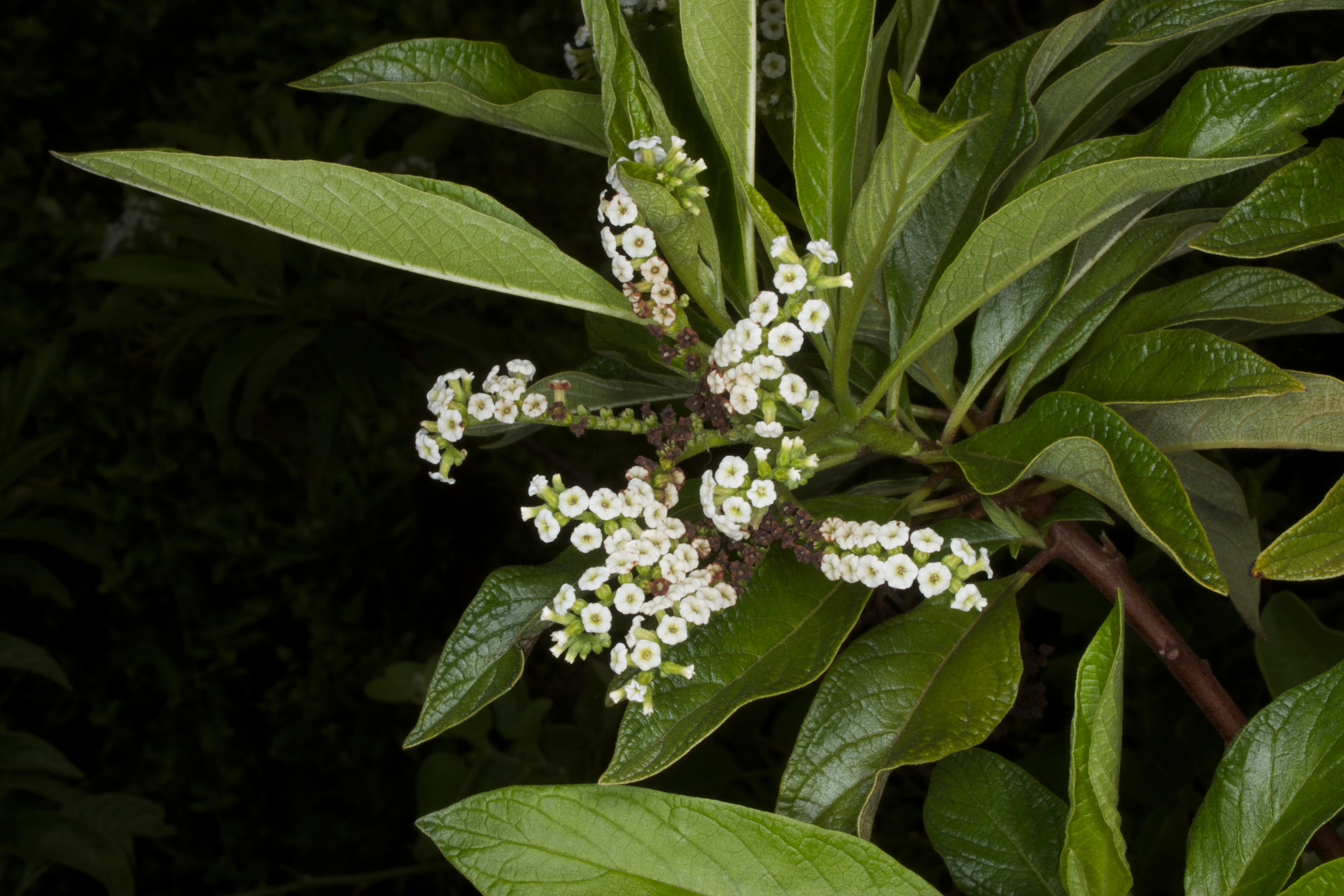

Conservation status
- Least Concern (IUCN 3.1)

Scientific classification
- Kingdom: Plantae
- Clade: Tracheophytes
- Clade: Angiosperms
- Clade: Eudicots
- Clade: Asterids
- Order: Boraginales
- Family: Boraginaceae
- Genus: Tournefortia
- Species: T. pubescens

Binomial name
- Tournefortia pubescens Hook.f.

= Tournefortia pubescens =

Species of plant

Tournefortia pubescens is a species of plant in the family Boraginaceae. It is endemic to the Galápagos Islands.
