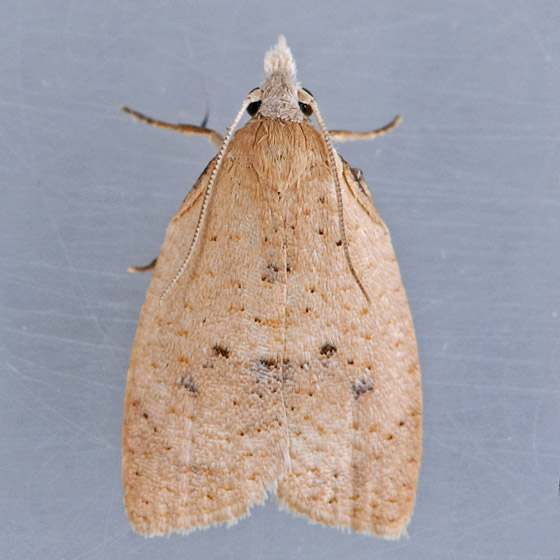

Scientific classification
- Kingdom: Animalia
- Phylum: Arthropoda
- Clade: Pancrustacea
- Class: Insecta
- Order: Lepidoptera
- Family: Tortricidae
- Subfamily: Tortricinae
- Tribe: Sparganothini
- Genus: Sparganothoides; Lambert & Powell, 1986

= Sparganothoides =

Genus of tortrix moths

Sparganothoides is a genus of moths belonging to the subfamily Tortricinae of the family Tortricidae.

== Species ==
- aciculana species group
  - Sparganothoides aciculana Kruse & Powell, 2009
  - Sparganothoides broccusana Kruse & Powell, 2009
  - Sparganothoides cornutana Kruse & Powell, 2009
  - Sparganothoides silaceana Kruse & Powell, 2009
- hydeana species group
  - Sparganothoides amitana Kruse & Powell, 2009
  - Sparganothoides audentiana Kruse & Powell, 2009
  - Sparganothoides calthograptana Kruse & Powell, 2009
  - Sparganothoides canities Kruse & Powell, 2009
  - Sparganothoides coloratana Kruse & Powell, 2009
  - Sparganothoides hydeana (Klots, 1936)
  - Sparganothoides laderana Kruse & Powell, 2009
  - Sparganothoides machimiana (Barnes & Busck, 1920)
- lentiginosana species group
  - Sparganothoides lentiginosana (Walsingham, 1879)
- morata species group
  - Sparganothoides albescens (Walsingham, 1913)
  - Sparganothoides morata (Walsingham, 1913)
  - Sparganothoides polymitariana Kruse & Powell, 2009
  - Sparganothoides prolesana Kruse & Powell, 2009
  - Sparganothoides torusana Kruse & Powell, 2009
- ocrisana species group
  - Sparganothoides arcuatana Kruse & Powell, 2009
  - Sparganothoides canorisana Kruse & Powell, 2009
  - Sparganothoides capitiornata Kruse & Powell, 2009
  - Sparganothoides licrosana Kruse & Powell, 2009
  - Sparganothoides ocrisana Kruse & Powell, 2009
  - Sparganothoides probolosana Kruse & Powell, 2009
  - Sparganothoides umbosana Kruse & Powell, 2009
  - Sparganothoides xenopsana Kruse & Powell, 2009
- teratana species group
  - Sparganothoides carycrosana Kruse & Powell, 2009
  - Sparganothoides castanea (Walsingham, 1913)
  - Sparganothoides lugens (Walsingham, 1913)
  - Sparganothoides plemmelana Kruse & Powell, 2009
  - Sparganothoides teratana (Zeller, 1877)
  - Sparganothoides vinolenta (Walsingham, 1913)

== Former species ==
- Sparganothoides schausiana (Walsingham, 1913)
- Sparganothoides spadicea (Walsingham, 1913)

== See also ==
- List of Tortricidae genera
