= Aesiocopa =

Scientific classification
- Kingdom: Animalia
- Phylum: Arthropoda
- Clade: Pancrustacea
- Class: Insecta
- Order: Lepidoptera
- Family: Tortricidae
- Tribe: Sparganothini
- Genus: Aesiocopa; Zeller, 1877

Genus of tortrix moths

Aesiocopa is a genus of moths belonging to the subfamily Tortricinae of the family Tortricidae.

== Species ==
- Aesiocopa grandis
- Aesiocopa necrofolia
- Aesiocopa vacivana (Zeller, 1877)

== Former species ==
- Aesiocopa concavata Meyrick 1930
- Aesiocopa patulana Walker

== See also ==
- List of Tortricidae genera
