= Coelostathma contigua =

Scientific classification
- Domain: Eukaryota
- Kingdom: Animalia
- Phylum: Arthropoda
- Class: Insecta
- Order: Lepidoptera
- Family: Tortricidae
- Genus: Coelostathma
- Species: C. contigua

Binomial name
- Coelostathma contigua Meyrick, 1926

Species of moth

Coelostathma contigua is a species of moth of the family Tortricidae. It is known from Tefé in Amazonas, Brazil, and from Napo River in Peru.

The wingspan is 13–14 mm (0.51–0.55 in) in females. It is similar to Coelostathma discopunctana.
