= Sparganothoides amitana =

Scientific classification
- Kingdom: Animalia
- Phylum: Arthropoda
- Clade: Pancrustacea
- Class: Insecta
- Order: Lepidoptera
- Family: Tortricidae
- Genus: Sparganothoides
- Species: S. amitana

Binomial name
- Sparganothoides amitana Kruse & Powell, 2009

Species of moth

Sparganothoides amitana is a species of moth of the family Tortricidae. It is found in Jalisco, Mexico.

The length of the forewings is about 8.2 mm for males and 8.4 mm for females.

== Etymology ==
The species name refers to the close relationship to Sparganothoides machimiana and is derived from Latin amita (meaning paternal aunt).
