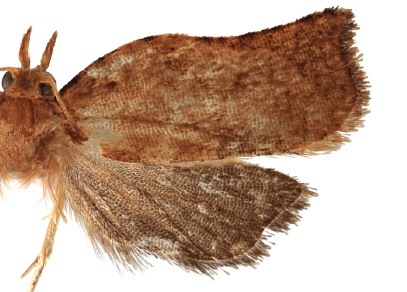

Scientific classification
- Domain: Eukaryota
- Kingdom: Animalia
- Phylum: Arthropoda
- Class: Insecta
- Order: Lepidoptera
- Family: Tortricidae
- Genus: Circanota
- Species: C. simplex

Binomial name
- Circanota simplex Brown, 2014

= Circanota simplex =

Species of moth

Circanota simplex is a species of moth of the family Tortricidae. It is found in Panama and Ecuador, at altitudes between sea level and 600 meters.

The length of the forewings is about 6 mm for males and 7–8 mm for females. The forewings are fawn brown mixed throughout with pale orange brown, with faint, narrow, variable traces of slightly darker post-median and subterminal facia and a few short darker markings along the costa. The hindwings are uniform dark grey brown. Adults have been recorded on wing in May.

== Etymology ==
The species name refers to the simple, unmodified features of the genitalia as compared with those of Circanota undulata.
