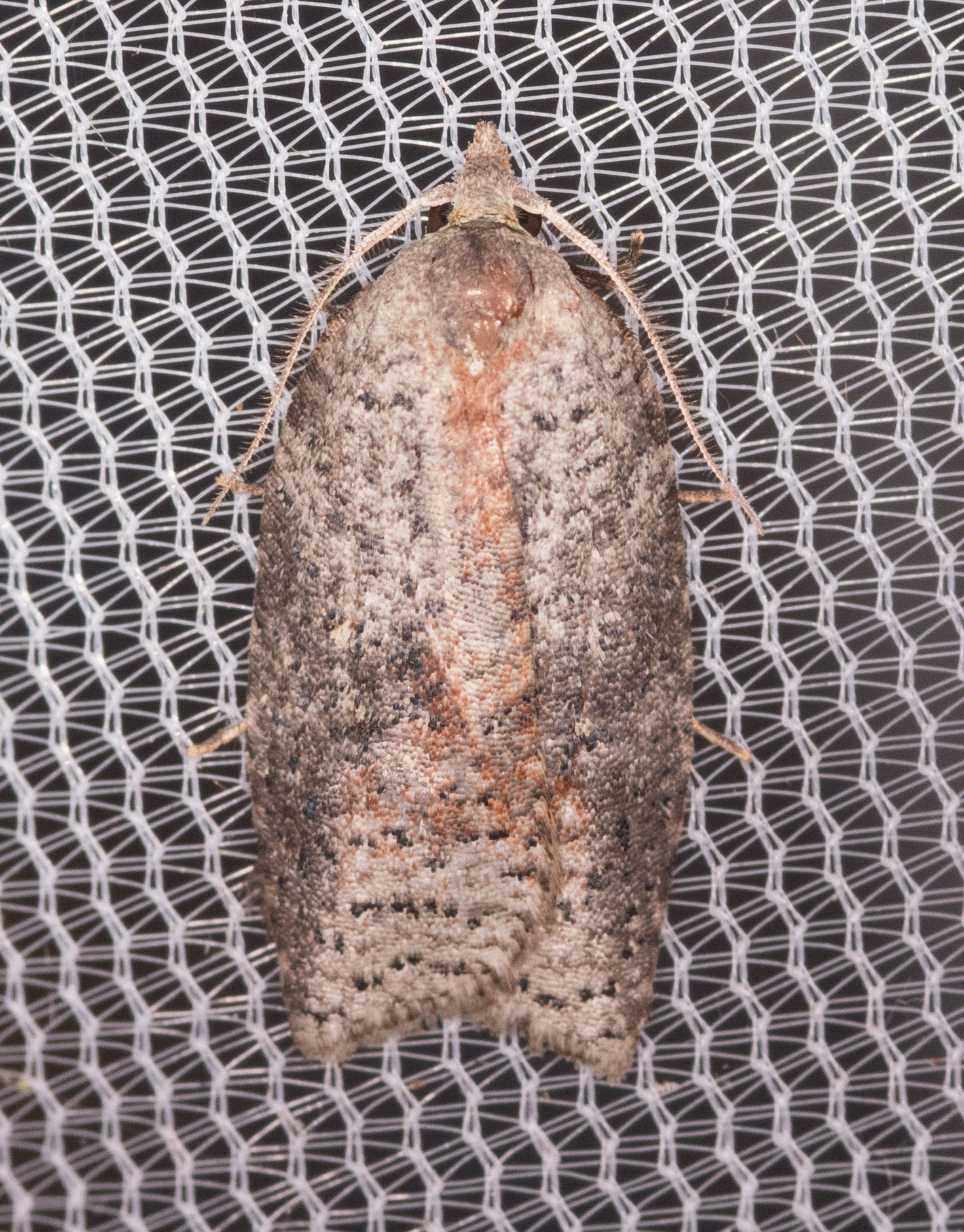
- Amorbia humerosana

Scientific classification
- Domain: Eukaryota
- Kingdom: Animalia
- Phylum: Arthropoda
- Class: Insecta
- Order: Lepidoptera
- Family: Tortricidae
- Tribe: Sparganothini
- Genus: Amorbia; Clemens, 1860

Synonyms
- Hendecastema Walsingham, 1879; Ptychamorbia Walsingham, 1891

= Amorbia =

Genus of tortrix moths

Amorbia is a genus of moths belonging to the subfamily Tortricinae of the family Tortricidae.

== Species ==
- Group curitiba
  - Amorbia curitiba Phillips & Powell, 2007
  - Amorbia stenovalvae Phillips & Powell, 2007
- Group productana
  - Amorbia catarina Phillips & Powell, 2007
  - Amorbia dominicana Phillips & Powell, 2007
  - Amorbia productana (Walker, 1863)
  - Amorbia revolutana Zeller, 1877
- Group humerosana
  - Amorbia cuneanum (Walsingham, 1879)
  - Amorbia humerosana Clemens, 1860
  - Amorbia santamaria Phillips & Powell, 2007
- Group chiapas
  - Amorbia chiapas Phillips & Powell, 2007
  - Amorbia potosiana Phillips & Powell, 2007
- Group colubrana
  - Amorbia cacoa Phillips & Polwell, 2007
  - Amorbia cocori Phillips & Powell, 2007
  - Amorbia colubrana (Zeller, 1866)
  - Amorbia exustana (Zeller, 1866)
  - Amorbia knudsoni Phillips & Powell, 2007
  - Amorbia laterculana (Zeller, 1877)
  - Amorbia nuptana (Felder & Rogenhofer, 1875)
  - Amorbia osmotris Meyrick, 1932
- Group exsectana
  - Amorbia exsectana (Zeller, 1877)
- Group rectangularis
  - Amorbia concavana (Zeller, 1877)
  - Amorbia emigratella Busck, 1909, Mexican leaf-roller
  - Amorbia rectangularis Meyrick, 1931
- Group decerptana
  - Amorbia chlorolyca Meyrick, 1931
  - Amorbia cordobana Phillips & Powell, 2007
  - Amorbia decerptana (Zeller, 1877)
  - Amorbia eccopta Walsingham, 1913
  - Amorbia monteverde Phillips & Powell, 2007
  - Amorbia rhombobasis Phillips & Powell, 2007
- Species group unknown
  - Amorbia depicta Walsingham, 1913
  - Amorbia effoetana (Moschler, 1891)
  - Amorbia elaeopetra Meyrick, 1932
  - Amorbia jaczewskii Razowski & Wojtusiak, 2008
  - Amorbia helioxantha Meyrick, 1917
  - Amorbia leptophracta (Meyrick, 1931)
  - Amorbia maracayana Amsel, 1956
  - Amorbia rectilineana (Zeller, 1877)
  - Amorbia trisecta Razowski & Wojtusiak, 2010
  - Amorbia vero Powell & Brown, 2012

== Former species ==
- Amorbia teratana (Zeller, 1877)

== See also ==
- List of Tortricidae genera
