= Paramorbia rostellana =

Scientific classification
- Kingdom: Animalia
- Phylum: Arthropoda
- Clade: Pancrustacea
- Class: Insecta
- Order: Lepidoptera
- Family: Tortricidae
- Genus: Paramorbia
- Species: P. rostellana

Binomial name
- Paramorbia rostellana (Zeller, 1877)

Synonyms
- Oenectra rostellana Zeller, 1877

Species of moth

Paramorbia rostellana is a species of moth of the family Tortricidae. It has been reported in Costa Rica, Colombia, and Panama.
