= Sparganothoides broccusana =

Scientific classification
- Kingdom: Animalia
- Phylum: Arthropoda
- Clade: Pancrustacea
- Class: Insecta
- Order: Lepidoptera
- Family: Tortricidae
- Genus: Sparganothoides
- Species: S. broccusana

Binomial name
- Sparganothoides broccusana Kruse & Powell, 2009

Species of moth

Sparganothoides broccusana is a species of moth of the family Tortricidae. It is found in the mountains of Jalisco and Sinaloa in western Mexico.

The length of the forewings is 7–9.3 mm for males and about 8.6 mm for females.
