= Archipimima telemaco =

Scientific classification
- Kingdom: Animalia
- Phylum: Arthropoda
- Clade: Pancrustacea
- Class: Insecta
- Order: Lepidoptera
- Family: Tortricidae
- Genus: Archipimima
- Species: A. telemaco

Binomial name
- Archipimima telemaco Razowski & Becker, 2011

Species of moth

Archipimima telemaco is a species of moth of the family Tortricidae. It is found in Paraná, Brazil.

The wingspan is about 15 millimetres (0.59 in).

== Etymology ==
The species name refers to the type locality.
