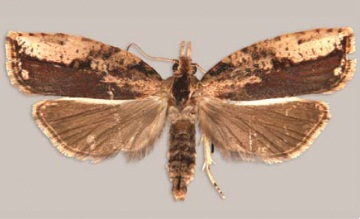
- Female
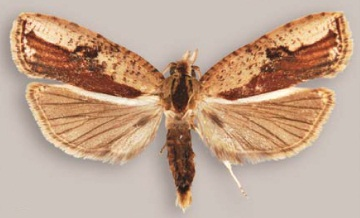
- Male

Scientific classification
- Domain: Eukaryota
- Kingdom: Animalia
- Phylum: Arthropoda
- Class: Insecta
- Order: Lepidoptera
- Family: Tortricidae
- Tribe: Sparganothini
- Genus: Sparganocosma; Brown, 2013
- Species: S. docsturnerorum

Binomial name
- Sparganocosma docsturnerorum Brown, 2013

= Sparganocosma =

Genus of moths

Sparganocosma is a genus of moths in the family Tortricidae. It contains only one species, Sparganocosma docsturnerorum, which is found in north-western Costa Rica.

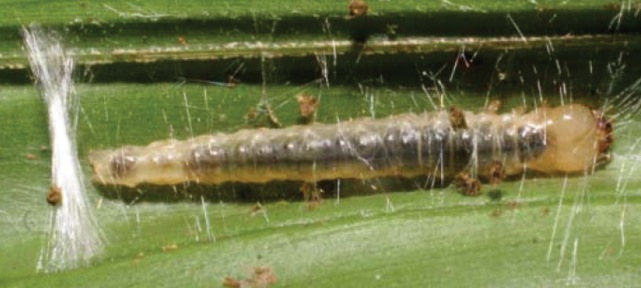
Larva

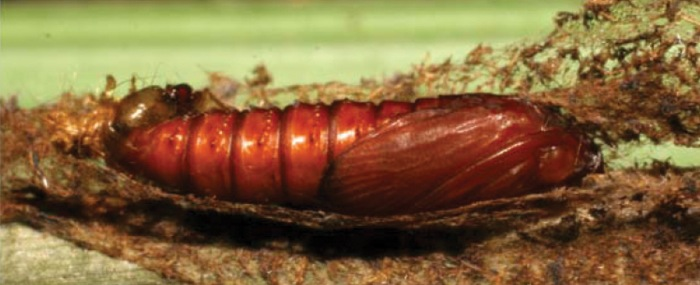
Pupa

The length of the forewings is 8.8–11 mm for males and 10.5–13 mm for females. The forewings have two large ovoid patches of pale buff in the costal region. These patches are infrequently separated by a narrow brown remnant of a median fascia. The patches usually have small flecks of brown. The remainder of the wing has a broad brown longitudinal band along the dorsum. The hindwings are rather uniformly dark grey brown. They are slightly darker in females.

The larvae have been recorded feeding on Asplundia utilis and Asplundia microphylla. They are pale translucent yellow gold with a nearly uniformly amber head.

== Etymology ==
The genus name is derived from Latin spargano (meaning to scatter or throw around) and cosm (referring to the universe). The species is named in honour of Drs. John Turner and Nancy Turner, who psychologically and financially supported the Lepidoptera inventory of Área de Conservación in Costa Rica.
