= Sparganothoides ocrisana =

Scientific classification
- Kingdom: Animalia
- Phylum: Arthropoda
- Clade: Pancrustacea
- Class: Insecta
- Order: Lepidoptera
- Family: Tortricidae
- Genus: Sparganothoides
- Species: S. ocrisana

Binomial name
- Sparganothoides ocrisana Kruse & Powell, 2009

Species of moth

Sparganothoides ocrisana is a species of moth of the family Tortricidae. It is found in Costa Rica, Guatemala and Veracruz in Mexico.

The length of the forewings is 7.8–9.1 mm for males and 8.7–10.4 mm for females. Adults have been recorded on wing year round except April and September. There are probably multiple generations per year in Costa Rica and two further north.

Larvae have been reared on Prunus species.

== Etymology ==
The species name refers to the protuberances of the head and is derived from Greek okris (meaning projecting).
