= Archipimima consentanea =

Scientific classification
- Domain: Eukaryota
- Kingdom: Animalia
- Phylum: Arthropoda
- Class: Insecta
- Order: Lepidoptera
- Family: Tortricidae
- Genus: Archipimima
- Species: A. consentanea

Binomial name
- Archipimima consentanea Razowski, 2004

Species of moth

Archipimima consentanea is a species of moth of the family Tortricidae. It was described by Razowski in 2004. It is found in Santa Catarina, Brazil.

The wingspan is about 21 millimetres (0.83 in).
