= Amorbia effoetana =

Scientific classification
- Kingdom: Animalia
- Phylum: Arthropoda
- Clade: Pancrustacea
- Class: Insecta
- Order: Lepidoptera
- Family: Tortricidae
- Genus: Amorbia
- Species: A. effoetana

Binomial name
- Amorbia effoetana (Möschler, 1891)

Synonyms
- Tortrix effoetana Möschler, 1890

Species of insect

Amorbia effoetana is a species of moth of the family Tortricidae. It is found in Puerto Rico and Cuba.
