= Amorbia elaeopetra =

Scientific classification
- Kingdom: Animalia
- Phylum: Arthropoda
- Clade: Pancrustacea
- Class: Insecta
- Order: Lepidoptera
- Family: Tortricidae
- Genus: Amorbia
- Species: A. elaeopetra

Binomial name
- Amorbia elaeopetra Meyrick, 1932

Species of moth

Amorbia elaeopetra is a species of moth of the family Tortricidae. It is found in Santa Catarina, Brazil.
