= Amorbia chlorolyca =

Scientific classification
- Kingdom: Animalia
- Phylum: Arthropoda
- Clade: Pancrustacea
- Class: Insecta
- Order: Lepidoptera
- Family: Tortricidae
- Genus: Amorbia
- Species: A. chlorolyca

Binomial name
- Amorbia chlorolyca Meyrick, 1931

Species of moth

Amorbia chlorolyca is a species of moth of the family Tortricidae. It is found in southern Brazil, where it is found at altitudes between 69 and 500 meters.

The length of the forewings is 8–9.8 mm for males and 10-11.2 mm for females. Adults have been recorded on wing every month of the year except March, April and September.
