= Rhynchophyllis categorica =

Scientific classification
- Kingdom: Animalia
- Phylum: Arthropoda
- Class: Insecta
- Order: Lepidoptera
- Family: Tortricidae
- Genus: Rhynchophyllis
- Species: R. categorica

Binomial name
- Rhynchophyllis categorica Meyrick, 1932

Species of moth

Rhynchophyllis categorica is a species of moth of the family Tortricidae. It is found in Santa Catarina, Brazil.

The wingspan is about 22 mm. The forewings are rufous brown, with some vague fuscous suffusion indicating an irregular patch extending along the dorsum from near the base to two-thirds and reaching two-thirds across the wing, extended in the middle to the costa, and an apical patch extended on both margins. The hindwings are pale whitish yellowish.
