= Synalocha gutierreziae =

Scientific classification
- Kingdom: Animalia
- Phylum: Arthropoda
- Clade: Pancrustacea
- Class: Insecta
- Order: Lepidoptera
- Family: Tortricidae
- Genus: Synalocha
- Species: S. gutierreziae

Binomial name
- Synalocha gutierreziae J.A. Powell, 1985

Species of moth

Synalocha gutierreziae is a species of moth of the family Tortricidae. It is found in the United States in Texas, Arizona and New Mexico.

The length of the forewings is about 6.5-7.9 mm for males and 6.5-10.5 mm for females. Adult males are on wing in October and November. There are multiple generations per year.

The larvae have been recorded feeding on Gutierrezia sarothrae and Gutierrezia microcephalum. Pupation occurs in tied leaves of their host plant.
