= Anchicremna uncinata =

Scientific classification
- Kingdom: Animalia
- Phylum: Arthropoda
- Class: Insecta
- Order: Lepidoptera
- Family: Tortricidae
- Genus: Anchicremna
- Species: A. uncinata

Binomial name
- Anchicremna uncinata Razowski & Wojtusiak, 2010

Species of moth

Anchicremna uncinata is a species of moth of the family Tortricidae. It is known from the Cordillera Vilcanota in the Cusco Region, Peru. The holotype was collected at 3,100 m (10,200 ft) above sea level.

The wingspan is about 27.5 mm for the holotype, a male.
