= Sparganothoides cornutana =

Scientific classification
- Kingdom: Animalia
- Phylum: Arthropoda
- Clade: Pancrustacea
- Class: Insecta
- Order: Lepidoptera
- Family: Tortricidae
- Genus: Sparganothoides
- Species: S. cornutana

Binomial name
- Sparganothoides cornutana Kruse & Powell, 2009

Species of moth

Sparganothoides cornutana is a species of moth of the family Tortricidae. It is found from Mexico (Hidalgo, Veracruz and Chiapas), south into Guatemala. The habitat consists of mixed broadleaf woods.

The length of the forewings is 6.9–8.4 mm for males and 6.8–9.9 mm for females. Adults have been recorded on wing in July, August and November, probably in two generations per year.

Larvae have been reared on Quercus lobata.

== Etymology ==
The species name refers to the protuberances on the head and is derived from Latin cornu (meaning horn).
