= Amorbia curitiba =

Scientific classification
- Kingdom: Animalia
- Phylum: Arthropoda
- Clade: Pancrustacea
- Class: Insecta
- Order: Lepidoptera
- Family: Tortricidae
- Genus: Amorbia
- Species: A. curitiba

Binomial name
- Amorbia curitiba Phillips & Powell, 2007

Species of moth

Amorbia curitiba is a species of moth of the family Tortricidae. It is found in Paraná, Brazil.

The length of the forewings is 8–8.5 mm for males and 10–11 mm for females.

== Etymology ==
The species name refers to Curitiba, the type locality.
