= Amorbia cordobana =

Scientific classification
- Kingdom: Animalia
- Phylum: Arthropoda
- Clade: Pancrustacea
- Class: Insecta
- Order: Lepidoptera
- Family: Tortricidae
- Genus: Amorbia
- Species: A. cordobana

Binomial name
- Amorbia cordobana Phillips & Powell, 2007

Species of moth

Amorbia cordobana is a species of moth of the family Tortricidae. It is found in Veracruz, Mexico.

The length of the forewings is 8.4–8.5 mm for males and 9–9.5 mm for females.
