= Sparganothoides laderana =

Scientific classification
- Kingdom: Animalia
- Phylum: Arthropoda
- Clade: Pancrustacea
- Class: Insecta
- Order: Lepidoptera
- Family: Tortricidae
- Genus: Sparganothoides
- Species: S. laderana

Binomial name
- Sparganothoides laderana Kruse & Powell, 2009

Species of moth

Sparganothoides laderana is a species of moth of the family Tortricidae. It is found in Mexico, where it has been recorded from Popocatépetl and Iguala in Guerrero.

The length of the forewings is 11.2–11.9 mm.
