= Sparganothoides aciculana =

Scientific classification
- Kingdom: Animalia
- Phylum: Arthropoda
- Clade: Pancrustacea
- Class: Insecta
- Order: Lepidoptera
- Family: Tortricidae
- Genus: Sparganothoides
- Species: S. aciculana

Binomial name
- Sparganothoides aciculana Kruse & Powell, 2009

Species of moth

Sparganothoides aciculana is a species of moth of the family Tortricidae. It is found in the highlands of central Mexico.

The length of the forewings is 8.7–10.2 mm for males and about 10.4 mm for females.
