= Syllonoma =

Scientific classification
- Kingdom: Animalia
- Phylum: Arthropoda
- Clade: Pancrustacea
- Class: Insecta
- Order: Lepidoptera
- Family: Tortricidae
- Tribe: Sparganothini
- Genus: Syllonoma; Powell, 1985

Genus of tortrix moths

Syllonoma is a genus of moths belonging to the family Tortricidae, first described by Jerry A. Powell in 1985.

== Species ==
- Syllonoma longipalpana Powell, 1985

== See also ==
- List of Tortricidae genera
