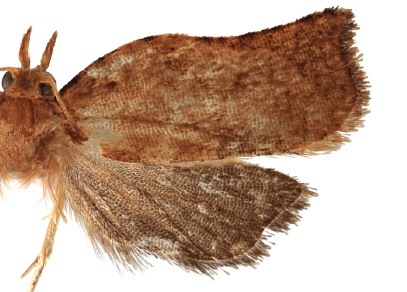
- Circanota simplex

Scientific classification
- Domain: Eukaryota
- Kingdom: Animalia
- Phylum: Arthropoda
- Class: Insecta
- Order: Lepidoptera
- Family: Tortricidae
- Tribe: Sparganothini
- Genus: Circanota; Brown, 2014

= Circanota =

Genus of moths

Circanota is a genus of moths belonging to the subfamily Tortricinae of the family Tortricidae.

== Species ==
- Circanota undulata Brown, 2014
- Circanota simplex Brown, 2014

== Etymology ==
The generic name is derived from Latin circum (meaning around) and nota (meaning mark).

== See also ==
- List of Tortricidae genera
