= Sparganothoides prolesana =

Scientific classification
- Kingdom: Animalia
- Phylum: Arthropoda
- Clade: Pancrustacea
- Class: Insecta
- Order: Lepidoptera
- Family: Tortricidae
- Genus: Sparganothoides
- Species: S. prolesana

Binomial name
- Sparganothoides prolesana Kruse & Powell, 2009

Species of moth

Sparganothoides prolesana is a species of moth of the family Tortricidae. It is found in Costa Rica.

The length of the forewings is 6.4–7.1 mm for males and about 7.7 mm for females. Adults have been recorded on wing from May to July.
