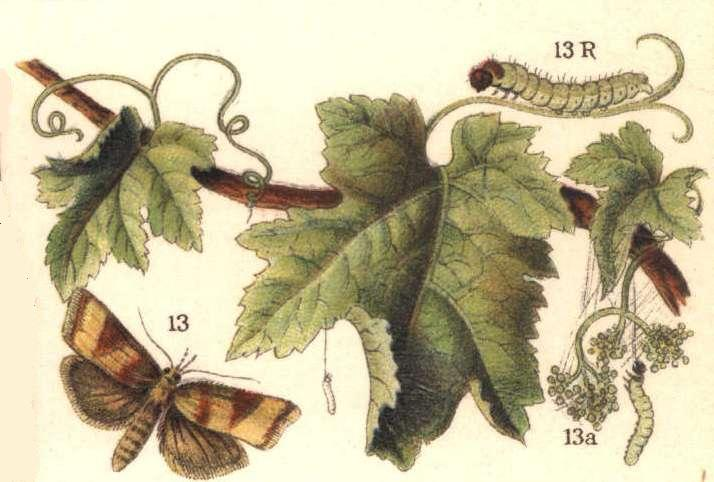
- Sparganothis pilleriana

Scientific classification
- Kingdom: Animalia
- Phylum: Arthropoda
- Class: Insecta
- Order: Lepidoptera
- Family: Tortricidae
- Subfamily: Tortricinae
- Tribe: Sparganothini; Druce, 1912

Genera
- See text

Synonyms
- Niasomini Powell, 1964

= Sparganothini =

Tribe of moths

The Sparganothini are a tribe of tortrix moths.

== Genera ==
Aesiocopa
Amorbia
Amorbimorpha
Anchicremna
Circanota
Coelostathma
Lambertiodes
Niasoma
paramorbia
Paramorbia
Rhynchophyllis
Sparganocosma
Sparganopseustis
Sparganothina
Sparganothis
Sparganothoides
†Spatalistiforma
Syllonoma
Synalocha
Synnoma

== Unplaced species ==
- Capua arrecta Meyrick, 1917
