= Lambertiodes multipunctata =

Scientific classification
- Domain: Eukaryota
- Kingdom: Animalia
- Phylum: Arthropoda
- Class: Insecta
- Order: Lepidoptera
- Family: Tortricidae
- Genus: Lambertiodes
- Species: L. multipunctata

Binomial name
- Lambertiodes multipunctata Wang & Li, 2007

Species of moth

Lambertiodes multipunctata is a moth of the family Tortricidae. It is found in China.

The wingspan is 27.5-29.5 mm for males and 31.5 mm for females. The forewing ground colour is pale yellow, with a number of scattered dark brown dots. The hindwings are pale grey, but slightly yellowish at the apex.

== Etymology ==
The specific name is derived from the Latin prefix multi- (meaning numerous) and punctatus (meaning punctuate) and refers to the many dark brown dots on the forewing.
