= Sparganothoides carycrosana =

Scientific classification
- Kingdom: Animalia
- Phylum: Arthropoda
- Clade: Pancrustacea
- Class: Insecta
- Order: Lepidoptera
- Family: Tortricidae
- Genus: Sparganothoides
- Species: S. carycrosana

Binomial name
- Sparganothoides carycrosana Kruse & Powell, 2009

Species of moth

Sparganothoides carycrosana is a species of moth of the family Tortricidae. It is found in Mexico from Sinaloa and Tamaulipas to Veracruz, south through Guatemala to Costa Rica.

The length of the forewings is 8.3–10.3 mm. Adults are on wing from January to June in Costa Rica and from May to August in Guatemala and Mexico. There are probably multiple generations per year.

== Etymology ==
The species name is derived from Greek karykrous (meaning nut brown).
