= Amorbia cocori =

Scientific classification
- Kingdom: Animalia
- Phylum: Arthropoda
- Clade: Pancrustacea
- Class: Insecta
- Order: Lepidoptera
- Family: Tortricidae
- Genus: Amorbia
- Species: A. cocori

Binomial name
- Amorbia cocori Phillips & Powell, 2007

Species of moth

Amorbia cocori is a species of moth of the family Tortricidae. It is found in Costa Rica, where it is found on the Pacific and Caribbean slopes at altitudes below 650 meters.

The length of the forewings is 11–13 mm for males and 16–17 mm for females.
