= Amorbia dominicana =

Scientific classification
- Kingdom: Animalia
- Phylum: Arthropoda
- Clade: Pancrustacea
- Class: Insecta
- Order: Lepidoptera
- Family: Tortricidae
- Genus: Amorbia
- Species: A. dominicana

Binomial name
- Amorbia dominicana Phillips & Powell, 2007

Species of moth

Amorbia dominicana is a species of moth of the family Tortricidae. It is endemic to Dominica.

The length of the forewings is 8.5–9 mm. Adults have been recorded on wing in March, May, June and November.

== Etymology ==
The species name refers to the country of the type locality.
