= Amorbia productana =

Scientific classification
- Kingdom: Animalia
- Phylum: Arthropoda
- Clade: Pancrustacea
- Class: Insecta
- Order: Lepidoptera
- Family: Tortricidae
- Genus: Amorbia
- Species: A. productana

Binomial name
- Amorbia productana (Walker, 1863)

Synonyms
- Dichelia productana Walker, 1863; Cacoecia aequiflexa Meyrick 1931; Amorbia aequiflexa

Species of moth

Amorbia productana is a species of moth of the family Tortricidae. It is found in Brazil, Colombia, Costa Rica, Guatemala, Honduras, Mexico, Nicaragua, Panama, and Suriname, where it is recorded from altitudes below 800 meters.

The length of the forewings is 7–9 mm. Adults have been recorded on wing year round.

The larvae have been recorded feeding on Sabicea panamensis and Vernonia patens.
