= Coelostathma xocoatlana =

Scientific classification
- Kingdom: Animalia
- Phylum: Arthropoda
- Clade: Pancrustacea
- Class: Insecta
- Order: Lepidoptera
- Family: Tortricidae
- Genus: Coelostathma
- Species: C. xocoatlana

Binomial name
- Coelostathma xocoatlana Landry in Landry & Powell, 2001

Species of moth

Coelostathma xocoatlana is a species of moth of the family Tortricidae. It is endemic to Costa Rica and known from elevations between 200 and 700 m (660 and 2,300 ft) above sea level.

The forewing length is 6–6.3 mm (0.24–0.25 in) in males; females are unknown. The forewings are pale golden brown dark brown markings (hence the specific name xocoatlana, from Nahuatl xocoatl, meaning "chocolate"). The thorax is dark brown.
