= Anchicremna =

Scientific classification
- Kingdom: Animalia
- Phylum: Arthropoda
- Class: Insecta
- Order: Lepidoptera
- Family: Tortricidae
- Tribe: Sparganothini
- Genus: Anchicremna; Meyrick, 1926

Genus of tortrix moths

Anchicremna is a genus of moths belonging to the subfamily Tortricinae of the family Tortricidae.

== Species ==
- Anchicremna eulidias Meyrick, 1926
- Anchicremna uncinata Razowski & Wojtusiak, 2010

== See also ==
- List of Tortricidae genera
