= Amorbimorpha powelliana =

Scientific classification
- Domain: Eukaryota
- Kingdom: Animalia
- Phylum: Arthropoda
- Class: Insecta
- Order: Lepidoptera
- Family: Tortricidae
- Genus: Amorbimorpha
- Species: A. powelliana

Binomial name
- Amorbimorpha powelliana Kruse, 2012

Species of moth

Amorbimorpha powelliana is a species of moth of the family Tortricidae. It is found in Mexico (Nuevo Leon and possibly Hidalgo).

The length of the forewings is 12.7–14.5 mm for males and 11.7–15.5 mm for females.
