= Sparganothoides umbosana =

Scientific classification
- Kingdom: Animalia
- Phylum: Arthropoda
- Clade: Pancrustacea
- Class: Insecta
- Order: Lepidoptera
- Family: Tortricidae
- Genus: Sparganothoides
- Species: S. umbosana

Binomial name
- Sparganothoides umbosana Kruse & Powell, 2009

Species of moth

Sparganothoides umbosana is a species of moth of the family Tortricidae. It is found in Sinaloa, Mexico.

The length of the forewings is 11.2 mm for males and 12.5 mm for females.
