= Coelostathma continua =

Scientific classification
- Kingdom: Animalia
- Phylum: Arthropoda
- Clade: Pancrustacea
- Class: Insecta
- Order: Lepidoptera
- Family: Tortricidae
- Genus: Coelostathma
- Species: C. continua

Binomial name
- Coelostathma continua Landry in Landry & Powell, 2001

Species of moth

Coelostathma continua is a species of moth of the family Tortricidae. It is endemic to Costa Rica and known from elevations between 50 and 1,400 m (160 and 4,590 ft) above sea level.

The forewing length is 4.7–6 mm (0.19–0.24 in) in males and 5.1 mm (0.20 in) in females. The forewings are pale gold-brown with minor dark brown markings. The thorax is dark brown.
