= Amorbia rectangularis =

Scientific classification
- Kingdom: Animalia
- Phylum: Arthropoda
- Clade: Pancrustacea
- Class: Insecta
- Order: Lepidoptera
- Family: Tortricidae
- Genus: Amorbia
- Species: A. rectangularis

Binomial name
- Amorbia rectangularis Meyrick, 1931

Species of moth

Amorbia rectangularis is a species of moth of the family Tortricidae. It is found from southern Brazil to Guatemala, where it is found at altitudes between 50 and 1,670 meters.

The length of the forewings is 6.5–8 mm for males and 9.5–12 mm for females. There seem to be multiple generations per year.
