= Paramorbia ithyclina =

Scientific classification
- Kingdom: Animalia
- Phylum: Arthropoda
- Class: Insecta
- Order: Lepidoptera
- Family: Tortricidae
- Genus: Paramorbia
- Species: P. ithyclina

Binomial name
- Paramorbia ithyclina (Meyrick, 1926)

Synonyms
- Sparganothis ithyclina Meyrick, 1926

Species of moth

Paramorbia ithyclina is a species of moth of the family Tortricidae. It is found in Colombia.
