= Tinacrucis atopa =

Scientific classification
- Domain: Eukaryota
- Kingdom: Animalia
- Phylum: Arthropoda
- Class: Insecta
- Order: Lepidoptera
- Family: Tortricidae
- Genus: Tinacrucis
- Species: T. atopa

Binomial name
- Tinacrucis atopa Razowski & Wojtusiak, 2008

Species of moth

Tinacrucis atopa is a species of moth of the family Tortricidae. It is found in the Cauca valley in Colombia.

The wingspan is about 30 mm.
