= Sparganothoides licrosana =

Scientific classification
- Kingdom: Animalia
- Phylum: Arthropoda
- Clade: Pancrustacea
- Class: Insecta
- Order: Lepidoptera
- Family: Tortricidae
- Genus: Sparganothoides
- Species: S. licrosana

Binomial name
- Sparganothoides licrosana Kruse & Powell, 2009

Species of moth

Sparganothoides licrosana is a species of moth of the family Tortricidae. It is found in Sinaloa, Mexico.

The length of the forewings is 11.6–12.1 mm for males and 10.8–11.9 mm for females.

The larvae have been reared on Quercus lobata.

== Etymology ==
The species name refers to the protuberances of the head and is derived from Greek likros (meaning horn).
