= Coelostathma placidana =

Scientific classification
- Kingdom: Animalia
- Phylum: Arthropoda
- Clade: Pancrustacea
- Class: Insecta
- Order: Lepidoptera
- Family: Tortricidae
- Genus: Coelostathma
- Species: C. placidana

Binomial name
- Coelostathma placidana Powell & Brown, 2012

Species of moth

Coelostathma placidana is a species of moth of the family Tortricidae. It is found in the south-eastern United States, from Virginia south to Florida and to eastern Texas.

The forewing length is 5.7–6.5 mm (0.22–0.26 in) in males and 5.5–6.5 mm (0.22–0.26 in) in females; forewing color is pale beige or whitish with some brown markings. The wingspan is 13–14 mm (0.51–0.55 in). Adults have been recorded from January to August, probably representing two generations (bivoltinism).
