= Archipimima tylonota =

Scientific classification
- Kingdom: Animalia
- Phylum: Arthropoda
- Class: Insecta
- Order: Lepidoptera
- Family: Tortricidae
- Genus: Archipimima
- Species: A. tylonota

Binomial name
- Archipimima tylonota (Meyrick, 1926)

Synonyms
- Capua tylonota Meyrick, 1926

Species of moth

Archipimima tylonota is a species of moth of the family Tortricidae. It is found in Colombia.
