= Sparganothoides arcuatana =

Scientific classification
- Kingdom: Animalia
- Phylum: Arthropoda
- Clade: Pancrustacea
- Class: Insecta
- Order: Lepidoptera
- Family: Tortricidae
- Genus: Sparganothoides
- Species: S. arcuatana

Binomial name
- Sparganothoides arcuatana Kruse & Powell, 2009

Species of moth

Sparganothoides arcuatana is a species of moth of the family Tortricidae. It is found in southern Mexico, where it is known from the Sierra Madre Occidental in Jalisco and the Sierra Madre Oriental in Veracruz and Puebla, ranging south to Oaxaca. The habitat consists of montane areas.

The length of the forewings is 10.3–12.1 mm for males and 11.1–12.5 mm for females. Adults have been recorded on wing in August and September.

The larvae have been reared on Quercus lobata. They web the edges of the leaves of their host plant.
