= Sparganothoides plemmelana =

Scientific classification
- Kingdom: Animalia
- Phylum: Arthropoda
- Clade: Pancrustacea
- Class: Insecta
- Order: Lepidoptera
- Family: Tortricidae
- Genus: Sparganothoides
- Species: S. plemmelana

Binomial name
- Sparganothoides plemmelana Kruse & Powell, 2009

Species of moth

Sparganothoides plemmelana is a species of moth of the family Tortricidae. It is found in Guatemala.

The length of the forewings is 8.6–9.6 mm.
