= Niasoma =

Scientific classification
- Kingdom: Animalia
- Phylum: Arthropoda
- Class: Insecta
- Order: Lepidoptera
- Family: Tortricidae
- Tribe: Sparganothini
- Genus: Niasoma; Busck, 1940

Genus of tortrix moths

Niasoma is a genus of moths belonging to the subfamily Tortricinae of the family Tortricidae.

== Species ==
- Niasoma metallicana (Walsingham, 1895)

== See also ==
- List of Tortricidae genera
