= Tinacrucis aquila =

Scientific classification
- Domain: Eukaryota
- Kingdom: Animalia
- Phylum: Arthropoda
- Class: Insecta
- Order: Lepidoptera
- Family: Tortricidae
- Genus: Tinacrucis
- Species: T. aquila

Binomial name
- Tinacrucis aquila (Busck, 1914)

Synonyms
- Homona aquila Busck, 1914; Homona consobrina Busck, 1914

Species of moth

Tinacrucis aquila is a species of moth of the family Tortricidae. It is found in Panama.
