= Amorbia concavana =

Scientific classification
- Kingdom: Animalia
- Phylum: Arthropoda
- Clade: Pancrustacea
- Class: Insecta
- Order: Lepidoptera
- Family: Tortricidae
- Genus: Amorbia
- Species: A. concavana

Binomial name
- Amorbia concavana (Zeller, 1877)

Synonyms
- Cacoecia concavana Zeller, 1877; Amorbia phaseolana Busck, 1933

Species of moth

Amorbia concavana is a species of moth of the family Tortricidae. It is found from Panama to Mexico and on Cuba, where it is found at altitudes between 50 and 300 meters. It has recently found in the United States in southern Florida.

The length of the forewings is 7.5–8.6 mm.

The larvae are polyphagous and have been reported feeding on Inga vera, Phaseolus species, Mimosa pigra and Hammelia species.
