= Amorbia rectilineana =

Scientific classification
- Kingdom: Animalia
- Phylum: Arthropoda
- Clade: Pancrustacea
- Class: Insecta
- Order: Lepidoptera
- Family: Tortricidae
- Genus: Amorbia
- Species: A. rectilineana

Binomial name
- Amorbia rectilineana (Zeller, 1877)

Synonyms
- Tortrix rectilineana Zeller, 1877

Species of moth

Amorbia rectilineana is a species of moth of the family Tortricidae. It is found in Panama.
