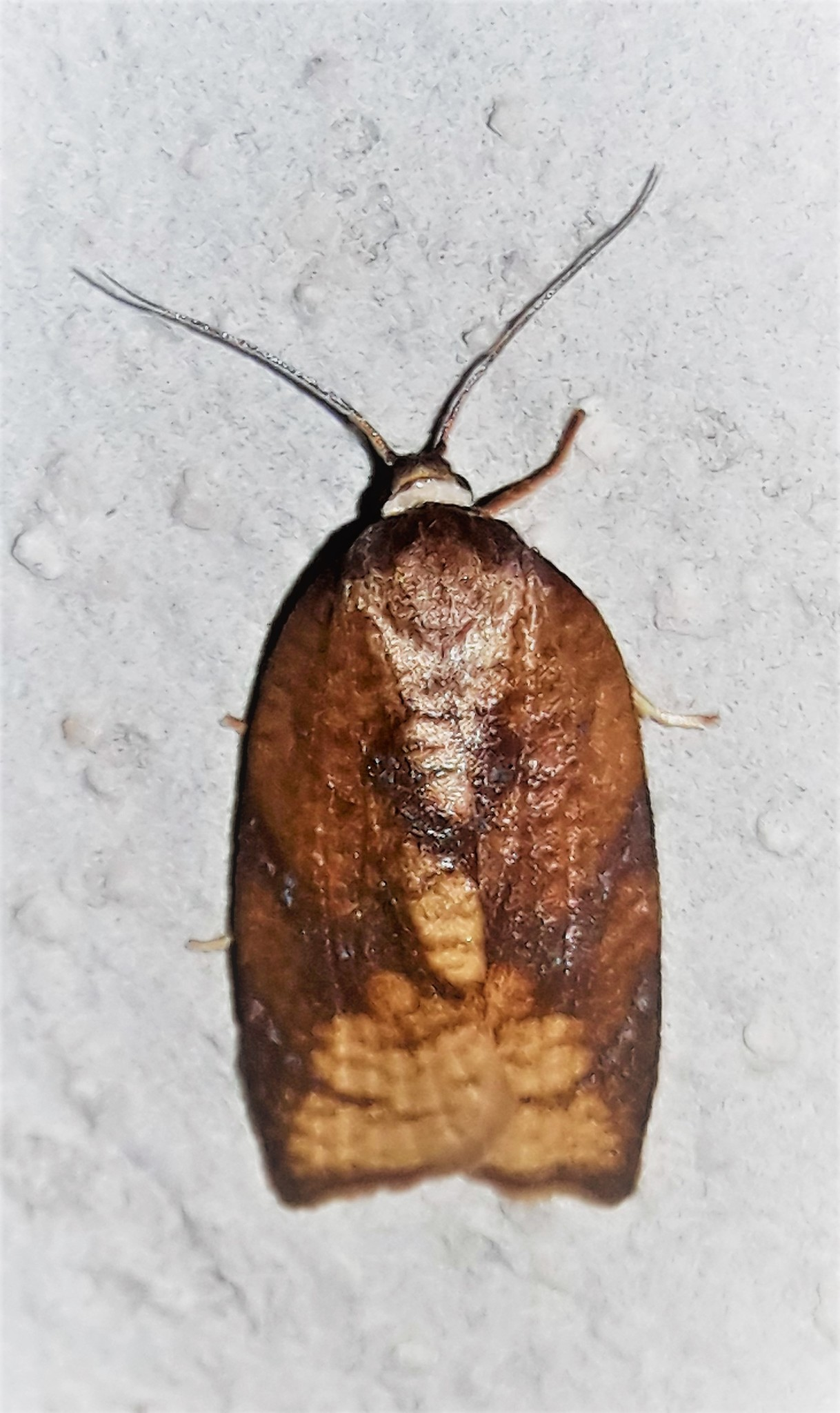

Scientific classification
- Kingdom: Animalia
- Phylum: Arthropoda
- Clade: Pancrustacea
- Class: Insecta
- Order: Lepidoptera
- Family: Tortricidae
- Genus: Amorbia
- Species: A. monteverde

Binomial name
- Amorbia monteverde Phillips & Powell, 2007

= Amorbia monteverde =

Species of moth

Amorbia monteverde is a species of moth in the family Tortricidae. It is found from Costa Rica to Veracruz in Mexico, where it is found at altitudes between 1,000 and 1,650 meters.

The length of the forewings is 8–8.4 mm for males and 10.2–11.2 mm for females. There are multiple generations per year.

== Etymology ==
The species name refers to the locality where the holotype and most of the material examined was collected: Monteverde in Puntarenas, Costa Rica.
