= Sparganothoides castanea =

Scientific classification
- Domain: Eukaryota
- Kingdom: Animalia
- Phylum: Arthropoda
- Class: Insecta
- Order: Lepidoptera
- Family: Tortricidae
- Genus: Sparganothoides
- Species: S. castanea

Binomial name
- Sparganothoides castanea (Walsingham, 1913)

Synonyms
- Amorbia castanea Walsingham, 1913

Species of moth

Sparganothoides castanea is a species of moth of the family Tortricidae. It is found in Guatemala.

The length of the forewings is about 14.1 mm.
