= Sparganothoides canorisana =

Scientific classification
- Kingdom: Animalia
- Phylum: Arthropoda
- Clade: Pancrustacea
- Class: Insecta
- Order: Lepidoptera
- Family: Tortricidae
- Genus: Sparganothoides
- Species: S. canorisana

Binomial name
- Sparganothoides canorisana Kruse & Powell, 2009

Species of moth

Sparganothoides canorisana is a species of moth of the family Tortricidae. It is found in Mexico (Tamaulipas, San Luis Potosí and Veracruz) and Guatemala.

The length of the forewings is 8.8–9.8 mm for males and about 10.2 mm for females. Adults have been recorded on wing in June, July, August and December. There are probably two or even multiple generations per year.

== Etymology ==
The species name refers to the enlarged apices of the socii/gnathos arms that resemble the treble clef musical symbol and is derived from Latin canor (meaning melody).
