= Aesiocopa vacivana =

Scientific classification
- Kingdom: Animalia
- Phylum: Arthropoda
- Clade: Pancrustacea
- Class: Insecta
- Order: Lepidoptera
- Family: Tortricidae
- Genus: Aesiocopa
- Species: A. vacivana

Binomial name
- Aesiocopa vacivana (Zeller, 1877)

Synonyms
- Tortrix vacivana Zeller, 1877

Species of moth

Aesiocopa vacivana is a species of moth of the family Tortricidae. It is found in Panama.
