= Amorbia revolutana =

Scientific classification
- Kingdom: Animalia
- Phylum: Arthropoda
- Clade: Pancrustacea
- Class: Insecta
- Order: Lepidoptera
- Family: Tortricidae
- Genus: Amorbia
- Species: A. revolutana

Binomial name
- Amorbia revolutana (Zeller, 1877)

Synonyms
- Cacoecia revolutana Zeller, 1877; Amorbia spilocryptis Meyrick, 1932

Species of moth

Amorbia revolutana is a species of moth of the family Tortricidae. It is found in Ecuador, Bolivia, Costa Rica, Cuba, Panama and Venezuela.

The length of the forewings is 7.5–8.9 mm for males and 11.9–13 mm for females. Adults have been recorded on wing nearly year round.

The larvae have been recorded feeding on Rubiaceae and Piperaceae species (including Piper auritum).
