= Anchicremna eulidias =

Scientific classification
- Kingdom: Animalia
- Phylum: Arthropoda
- Class: Insecta
- Order: Lepidoptera
- Family: Tortricidae
- Genus: Anchicremna
- Species: A. eulidias

Binomial name
- Anchicremna eulidias Meyrick, 1926

Species of moth

Anchicremna eulidias is a species of moth of the family Tortricidae. It is found in Colombia.
