= Archipimima vermelhana =

Scientific classification
- Domain: Eukaryota
- Kingdom: Animalia
- Phylum: Arthropoda
- Class: Insecta
- Order: Lepidoptera
- Family: Tortricidae
- Genus: Archipimima
- Species: A. vermelhana

Binomial name
- Archipimima vermelhana Razowski, 2004

Species of moth

Archipimima vermelhana is a species of moth of the family Tortricidae. It was described by Razowski in 2004. It is found in Brazil in the states of São Paulo and Santa Catarina.

The wingspan is about 17 millimetres (0.67 in).
