= Amorbia nuptana =

Scientific classification
- Kingdom: Animalia
- Phylum: Arthropoda
- Clade: Pancrustacea
- Class: Insecta
- Order: Lepidoptera
- Family: Tortricidae
- Genus: Amorbia
- Species: A. nuptana

Binomial name
- Amorbia nuptana (Felder & Rogenhofer, 1875)

Synonyms
- Cacoecia nuptana Felder & Rogenhofer, 1875

Species of moth

Amorbia nuptana is a species of moth of the family Tortricidae. It is found from Venezuela to Guatemala, where it is found at altitudes between 650 and 1,620 meters.

The length of the forewings is 11.2–12.5 mm for males and 14.4–14.6 mm for females.

The larvae feed on Guarea bullata. Full-grown larvae reach a length of about 20 mm.
