= Sparganothoides hydeana =

Scientific classification
- Domain: Eukaryota
- Kingdom: Animalia
- Phylum: Arthropoda
- Class: Insecta
- Order: Lepidoptera
- Family: Tortricidae
- Genus: Sparganothoides
- Species: S. hydeana

Binomial name
- Sparganothoides hydeana (Klots, 1936)

Synonyms
- Sparganothis hydeana Klots 1936

Species of moth

Sparganothoides hydeana is a species of moth of the family Tortricidae. It is found from the mountains of Arizona, Colorado and New Mexico in the United States south to Puebla in Mexico. The habitat consists of coniferous forests, pinyon-juniper, oak-cottonwood, and willow-Rhus associations.

The length of the forewings is 10.4–11.7 mm.
