= Sparganothoides audentiana =

Scientific classification
- Kingdom: Animalia
- Phylum: Arthropoda
- Clade: Pancrustacea
- Class: Insecta
- Order: Lepidoptera
- Family: Tortricidae
- Genus: Sparganothoides
- Species: S. audentiana

Binomial name
- Sparganothoides audentiana Kruse & Powell, 2009

Species of moth

Sparganothoides audentiana is a species of moth of the family Tortricidae. It is found in Mexico in the states of Tamaulipas and Nuevo Leon.

The length of the forewings is 11.1–11.7 mm.
