= Sparganothoides coloratana =

Scientific classification
- Kingdom: Animalia
- Phylum: Arthropoda
- Clade: Pancrustacea
- Class: Insecta
- Order: Lepidoptera
- Family: Tortricidae
- Genus: Sparganothoides
- Species: S. coloratana

Binomial name
- Sparganothoides coloratana Kruse & Powell, 2009

Species of moth

Sparganothoides coloratana is a species of moth of the family Tortricidae. It is found in Chihuahua, Mexico.

The length of the forewings is 9.9–10.8 mm for males and 9.6–11.4 mm for females.
