= Amorbia chiapas =

Scientific classification
- Kingdom: Animalia
- Phylum: Arthropoda
- Clade: Pancrustacea
- Class: Insecta
- Order: Lepidoptera
- Family: Tortricidae
- Genus: Amorbia
- Species: A. chiapas

Binomial name
- Amorbia chiapas Phillips & Powell, 2007

Species of moth

Amorbia chiapas is a species of moth of the family Tortricidae. It is found in Mexico in the states of Chiapas, Oaxaca and Veracruz, where it is found at altitudes between 1,700 and 2,300 meters.

The length of the forewings is 11.2–11.6 mm for males and 12.7–13.1 mm for females.

== Etymology ==
The species name refers to the Mexican state of Chiapas.
