= Amorbia eccopta =

Scientific classification
- Kingdom: Animalia
- Phylum: Arthropoda
- Clade: Pancrustacea
- Class: Insecta
- Order: Lepidoptera
- Family: Tortricidae
- Genus: Amorbia
- Species: A. eccopta

Binomial name
- Amorbia eccopta Walsingham, 1913

Species of moth

Amorbia eccopta is a species of moth of the family Tortricidae. It is found in Costa Rica, Guatemala and Mexico at altitudes between sea level and 1,600 meters.

The length of the forewings is 8.4–9 mm for males and 10-11.5 mm for females. There are multiple generations per year.
