= Archipimima archipiforma =

Scientific classification
- Kingdom: Animalia
- Phylum: Arthropoda
- Class: Insecta
- Order: Lepidoptera
- Family: Tortricidae
- Genus: Archipimima
- Species: A. archipiforma

Binomial name
- Archipimima archipiforma Razowski & Pelz, 2004

Species of moth

Archipimima archipiforma is a species of moth of the family Tortricidae. It is found in Morona-Santiago Province, Ecuador.
