= Amorbia stenovalvae =

Scientific classification
- Kingdom: Animalia
- Phylum: Arthropoda
- Clade: Pancrustacea
- Class: Insecta
- Order: Lepidoptera
- Family: Tortricidae
- Genus: Amorbia
- Species: A. stenovalvae

Binomial name
- Amorbia stenovalvae Phillips & Powell, 2007

Species of moth

Amorbia stenovalvae is a species of moth of the family Tortricidae. It is found in Guatemala and Mexico, where it has been collected at altitudes ranging from 250 to 2,000 meters.

The length of the forewings is 12.4–12.7 mm.

== Etymology ==
The species name refers to the narrow valva and is derived from Greek stenos (meaning narrow).
