= Sparganothoides polymitariana =

Scientific classification
- Kingdom: Animalia
- Phylum: Arthropoda
- Clade: Pancrustacea
- Class: Insecta
- Order: Lepidoptera
- Family: Tortricidae
- Genus: Sparganothoides
- Species: S. polymitariana

Binomial name
- Sparganothoides polymitariana Kruse & Powell, 2009

Species of moth

Sparganothoides polymitariana is a species of moth of the family Tortricidae. It is found in Costa Rica. The habitat consists of secondary forests.

The length of the forewings is about 7.4 mm. Adults have been recorded on wing in January.

== Etymology ==
The species name is derived from Latin polymitarius (meaning highly wrought or finished).
