= Sparganothoides canities =

Scientific classification
- Kingdom: Animalia
- Phylum: Arthropoda
- Clade: Pancrustacea
- Class: Insecta
- Order: Lepidoptera
- Family: Tortricidae
- Genus: Sparganothoides
- Species: S. canities

Binomial name
- Sparganothoides canities Kruse & Powell, 2009

Species of moth

Sparganothoides canities is a species of moth of the family Tortricidae. It is found in Durango, Mexico. The habitat consists of arid pinyon-juniper areas.

The length of the forewings is 8.8–9.5 mm for males and 8.4–9 mm for females.
