= Sparganothoides xenopsana =

Scientific classification
- Kingdom: Animalia
- Phylum: Arthropoda
- Clade: Pancrustacea
- Class: Insecta
- Order: Lepidoptera
- Family: Tortricidae
- Genus: Sparganothoides
- Species: S. xenopsana

Binomial name
- Sparganothoides xenopsana Kruse & Powell, 2009

Species of moth

Sparganothoides xenopsana is a species of moth of the family Tortricidae. It is found in Puebla, Mexico.

The length of the forewings is 11.9–13.1 mm.
