= Tinacrucis apertana =

Scientific classification
- Domain: Eukaryota
- Kingdom: Animalia
- Phylum: Arthropoda
- Class: Insecta
- Order: Lepidoptera
- Family: Tortricidae
- Genus: Tinacrucis
- Species: T. apertana

Binomial name
- Tinacrucis apertana (Walsingham, 1914)

Synonyms
- Tortrix apertana Walsingham, 1914

Species of moth

Tinacrucis apertana is a species of moth of the family Tortricidae. It is found in Veracruz, Mexico.
