= Tinacrucis sebasta =

Scientific classification
- Domain: Eukaryota
- Kingdom: Animalia
- Phylum: Arthropoda
- Class: Insecta
- Order: Lepidoptera
- Family: Tortricidae
- Genus: Tinacrucis
- Species: T. sebasta

Binomial name
- Tinacrucis sebasta (Walsingham, 1914)

Synonyms
- Homona sebasta Walsingham, 1914

Species of moth

Tinacrusis sebasta is a species of moth of the family Tortricidae. It is found in Guatemala and Mexico (Chiapas, Veracruz).
