= Amorbia catarina =

Scientific classification
- Kingdom: Animalia
- Phylum: Arthropoda
- Clade: Pancrustacea
- Class: Insecta
- Order: Lepidoptera
- Family: Tortricidae
- Genus: Amorbia
- Species: A. catarina

Binomial name
- Amorbia catarina Phillips & Powell, 2007

Species of moth

Amorbia catarina is a species of moth of the family Tortricidae. It is found in southern Brazil and Trinidad.

The length of the forewings is 8.5–8.9 mm. Adults have been recorded on wing in February, July, November and December.

== Etymology ==
The species name refers to the state of the type locality, Santa Catarina in Brazil.
