= Sparganothoides calthograptana =

Scientific classification
- Kingdom: Animalia
- Phylum: Arthropoda
- Clade: Pancrustacea
- Class: Insecta
- Order: Lepidoptera
- Family: Tortricidae
- Genus: Sparganothoides
- Species: S. calthograptana

Binomial name
- Sparganothoides calthograptana Kruse & Powell, 2009

Species of moth

Sparganothoides calthograptana is a species of moth of the family Tortricidae. It is found in north-western Hidalgo and the Popocatépetl Park in Mexico.

The length of the forewings is 10.3–11.4 mm for males and 10.1–12.2 mm for females. The ground colour of the forewings is yellowish brown to brownish orange with speckling of brown-tipped scales. The hindwings are white to yellowish grey.

== Etymology ==
The species name refers to the forewing coloration and is derived from Latin caltha (meaning marigold) and Greek graptos (meaning marked).
