= Amorbia potosiana =

Scientific classification
- Kingdom: Animalia
- Phylum: Arthropoda
- Clade: Pancrustacea
- Class: Insecta
- Order: Lepidoptera
- Family: Tortricidae
- Genus: Amorbia
- Species: A. potosiana

Binomial name
- Amorbia potosiana Phillips & Powell, 2007

Species of moth

Amorbia potosiana is a species of moth of the family Tortricidae. It is found on the mountain Cerro Potosí in Nuevo León, Mexico, at altitudes of about 2,000 meters.

The length of the forewings is about 12.4 mm.

== Etymology ==
The species name refers to Cerro Potosí, the type locality.
