= Amorbia depicta =

Scientific classification
- Kingdom: Animalia
- Phylum: Arthropoda
- Clade: Pancrustacea
- Class: Insecta
- Order: Lepidoptera
- Family: Tortricidae
- Genus: Amorbia
- Species: A. depicta

Binomial name
- Amorbia depicta Walsingham, 1913

Species of moth

Amorbia depicta is a species of moth of the family Tortricidae. It is found in Panama and Costa Rica.
