= Amorbia osmotris =

Scientific classification
- Kingdom: Animalia
- Phylum: Arthropoda
- Clade: Pancrustacea
- Class: Insecta
- Order: Lepidoptera
- Family: Tortricidae
- Genus: Amorbia
- Species: A. osmotris

Binomial name
- Amorbia osmotris Meyrick, 1932

Species of moth

Amorbia osmotris is a species of moth of the family Tortricidae. It is found in Costa Rica, where it is found at altitudes above 2,000 meters.

The length of the forewings is 12–14 mm for males and 14–15 mm for females. Adults are on wing year round.

The larvae feed on Rubus species, Weinmannia pinnata, Pernetia coriaceae, Vaccinium species and Quercus costaricensis.
