= Amorbia helioxantha =

Scientific classification
- Kingdom: Animalia
- Phylum: Arthropoda
- Clade: Pancrustacea
- Class: Insecta
- Order: Lepidoptera
- Family: Tortricidae
- Genus: Amorbia
- Species: A. helioxantha

Binomial name
- Amorbia helioxantha Meyrick, 1917

Species of moth

Amorbia helioxantha is a species of moth of the family Tortricidae. It is found in French Guiana.
