= Sparganothoides capitiornata =

Scientific classification
- Kingdom: Animalia
- Phylum: Arthropoda
- Clade: Pancrustacea
- Class: Insecta
- Order: Lepidoptera
- Family: Tortricidae
- Genus: Sparganothoides
- Species: S. capitiornata

Binomial name
- Sparganothoides capitiornata Kruse & Powell, 2009

Species of moth

Sparganothoides capitiornata is a species of moth of the family Tortricidae. It is found in Guatemala.

The length of the forewings is 9.1–10.2 mm for males and 9.9–10.7 mm for females. Adults have been recorded on wing in June and July and in October and November, probably in two generations per year.
