= Coelostathma cocoana =

Scientific classification
- Kingdom: Animalia
- Phylum: Arthropoda
- Clade: Pancrustacea
- Class: Insecta
- Order: Lepidoptera
- Family: Tortricidae
- Genus: Coelostathma
- Species: C. cocoana

Binomial name
- Coelostathma cocoana Landry in Landry & Powell, 2001

Species of moth

Coelostathma cocoana is a species of moth of the family Tortricidae. It is found on Cocos Island (Pacific Ocean/Costa Rica), as attested by its specific name.

The forewing length is 5.8–6.6 mm (0.23–0.26 in) in males and 6.9–7.6 mm (0.27–0.30 in) in females. The forewings are burned-orange with darker brown markings. The thorax is orange-brown.
