= Archipimima flexicostalis =

Scientific classification
- Domain: Eukaryota
- Kingdom: Animalia
- Phylum: Arthropoda
- Class: Insecta
- Order: Lepidoptera
- Family: Tortricidae
- Genus: Archipimima
- Species: A. flexicostalis

Binomial name
- Archipimima flexicostalis (Dognin, 1908)

Synonyms
- Tortrix flexicostalis Dognin, 1908

Species of moth

Archipimima flexicostalis is a species of moth of the family Tortricidae. It is found in Peru.
