= Lambertiodes =

Scientific classification
- Domain: Eukaryota
- Kingdom: Animalia
- Phylum: Arthropoda
- Class: Insecta
- Order: Lepidoptera
- Family: Tortricidae
- Tribe: Sparganothini
- Genus: Lambertiodes; Diakonoff, 1959

Genus of tortrix moths

Lambertiodes is a genus of moths belonging to the subfamily Tortricinae of the family Tortricidae.

== Species ==
- Lambertiodes harmonia (Meyrick, 1908)
- Lambertiodes multipunctata Wang & Li, 2007

== See also ==
- List of Tortricidae genera
