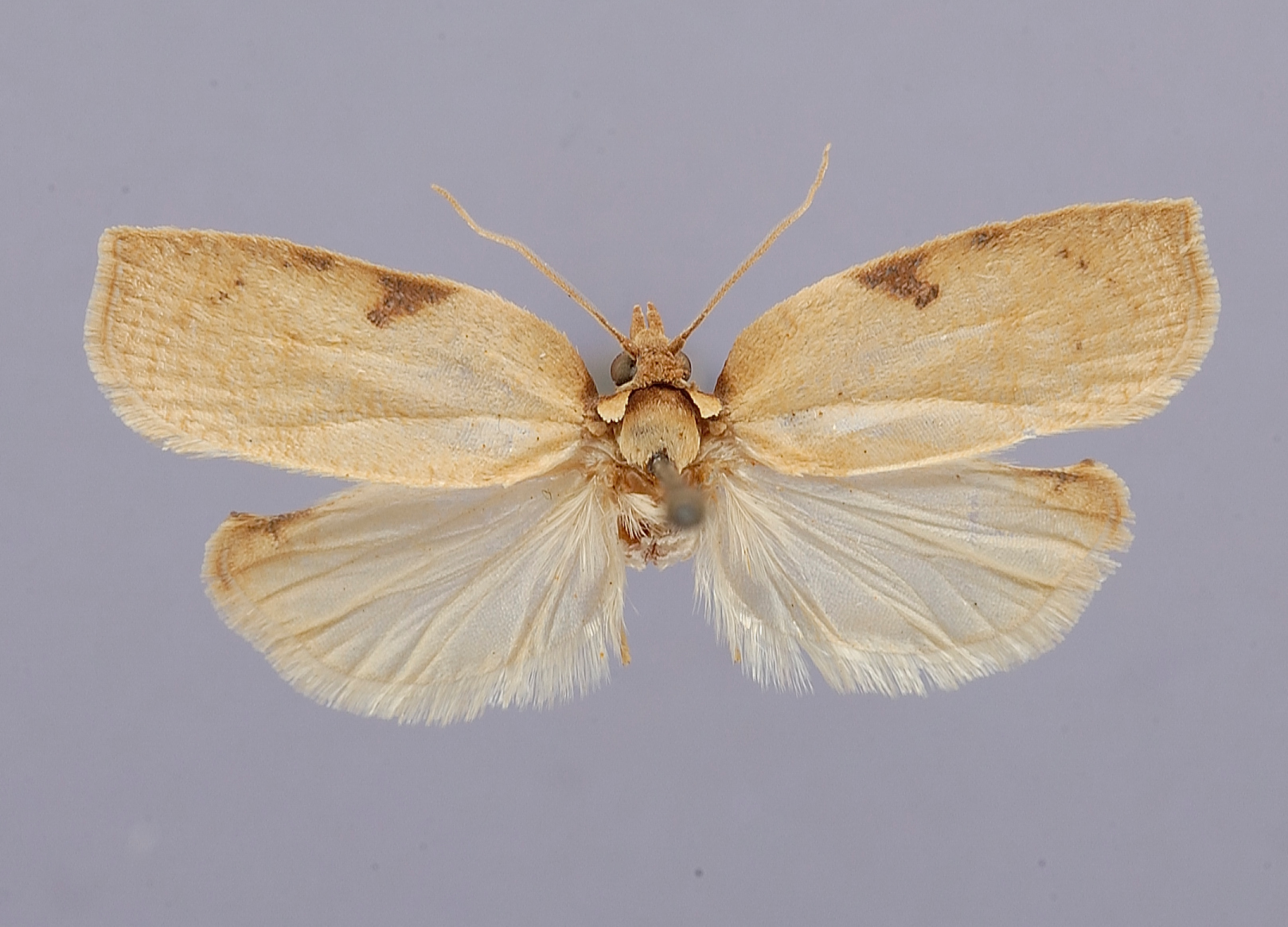

Scientific classification
- Kingdom: Animalia
- Phylum: Arthropoda
- Clade: Pancrustacea
- Class: Insecta
- Order: Lepidoptera
- Family: Tortricidae
- Genus: Amorbia
- Species: A. emigratella

Binomial name
- Amorbia emigratella Busck, 1910

= Amorbia emigratella =

Species of moth

Amorbia emigratella, the Mexican leaf-roller, is a moth of the family Tortricidae. Although it was described from Hawaii (where it is found on Kauai, Oahu, Molokai, Maui and Hawaii), it is known to be a native of the southern United States, Mexico and Central America. It was first described by August Busck in 1910.

The length of the forewings is 8–11 mm for males and 11.5–12 mm for females. There are multiple generations per year.

The larvae have been recorded on a wide range of plants, including Acacia koaia, Arachis hypogaea, Brassaia, Brassica oleracea, Carica papaya, Cassia leschenaltiana, Citrus sinensis, Dodonaea viscosa, Dracaena, Gardenia, Gliricidia septum, Gossypium, Ipomoea batatas, Lycopersicon esculentum, Macadamia, Orchidaceae, Passiflora, Persea americana, Phais, Phaseolus, Pipturus, Psidium guajava, Rosa, Rubus, Rubus hawaiiensis, Solanum melongena, Solanum tuberosum, Sophora, Theobroma cacao, Ulex europaeus, Wikstroemia foetida and Zea mays. The pupal stage takes about 10 days.
