= Archipimima sinuocostana =

Scientific classification
- Domain: Eukaryota
- Kingdom: Animalia
- Phylum: Arthropoda
- Class: Insecta
- Order: Lepidoptera
- Family: Tortricidae
- Genus: Archipimima
- Species: A. sinuocostana

Binomial name
- Archipimima sinuocostana Razowski & Wojtusiak, 2006

Species of moth

Archipimima sinuocostana is a species of moth of the family Tortricidae. It is endemic to Ecuador (Morona-Santiago Province).

== Etymology ==
The species name refers to the sinuate forewing costa.
