= Amorbia decerptana =

Scientific classification
- Kingdom: Animalia
- Phylum: Arthropoda
- Clade: Pancrustacea
- Class: Insecta
- Order: Lepidoptera
- Family: Tortricidae
- Genus: Amorbia
- Species: A. decerptana

Binomial name
- Amorbia decerptana (Zeller, 1877)

Synonyms
- Cacoecia decerptana Zeller, 1877

Species of moth

Amorbia decerptana is a species of moth of the family Tortricidae. It is found in Panama, Guatemala and Costa Rica, where it is found at altitudes between 200 and 600 meters.

The length of the forewings is 8–9.5 mm.
