= Lambertiodes harmonia =

Scientific classification
- Kingdom: Animalia
- Phylum: Arthropoda
- Class: Insecta
- Order: Lepidoptera
- Family: Tortricidae
- Genus: Lambertiodes
- Species: L. harmonia

Binomial name
- Lambertiodes harmonia (Meyrick, 1908)

Synonyms
- Epagoge harmonia Meyrick, 1908; Capua harmonia

Species of moth

Lambertiodes harmonia is a moth of the family Tortricidae. It is found in China (Sichuan, Yunnan, Tibet), Burma, Thailand, India, Nepal and Vietnam.
