= Capua arrecta =

"Capua" arrecta

Scientific classification
- Kingdom: Animalia
- Phylum: Arthropoda
- Clade: Pancrustacea
- Class: Insecta
- Order: Lepidoptera
- Family: Tortricidae
- Subfamily: Tortricinae
- Tribe: Sparganothini
- Genus: incertae sedis
- Species: "C." arrecta

Binomial name
- "Capua" arrecta Meyrick, 1917

Species of moth

"Capua" arrecta is a species of moth of the family Tortricidae. It is found in Peru.
