= Amorbia exustana =

Scientific classification
- Kingdom: Animalia
- Phylum: Arthropoda
- Clade: Pancrustacea
- Class: Insecta
- Order: Lepidoptera
- Family: Tortricidae
- Genus: Amorbia
- Species: A. exustana

Binomial name
- Amorbia exustana (Zeller, 1866)

Synonyms
- Tortrix exustana Zeller, 1866

Species of moth

Amorbia exustana is a species of moth of the family Tortricidae. It is found in Colombia and Costa Rica, where it is found at altitudes between 800 and 2,000 meters.

The length of the forewings is 10.5–11.5 mm for males and 12–13 mm for females.
