= Syllonoma longipalpana =

Scientific classification
- Kingdom: Animalia
- Phylum: Arthropoda
- Clade: Pancrustacea
- Class: Insecta
- Order: Lepidoptera
- Family: Tortricidae
- Genus: Syllonoma
- Species: S. longipalpana

Binomial name
- Syllonoma longipalpana J.A. Powell, 1985

Species of moth

Syllonoma longipalpana is a species of moth of the family Tortricidae. It is found in the United States in South and North Carolina.

The length of the forewings is about 6.4 mm for males and 7.3-7.6 mm for females.
