= Amorbia jaczewskii =

Scientific classification
- Kingdom: Animalia
- Phylum: Arthropoda
- Clade: Pancrustacea
- Class: Insecta
- Order: Lepidoptera
- Family: Tortricidae
- Genus: Amorbia
- Species: A. jaczewskii

Binomial name
- Amorbia jaczewskii Razowski & Wojtusiak, 2008

Species of moth

Amorbia jaczewskii is a species of moth of the family Tortricidae. It is found in Carchi Province, Ecuador.

The wingspan is about 26 mm for males and 30 mm for females.

== Etymology ==
The species is named in honour of Professor Dr Tadeusz Jaczewski.
