= Amorbimorpha =

Scientific classification
- Domain: Eukaryota
- Kingdom: Animalia
- Phylum: Arthropoda
- Class: Insecta
- Order: Lepidoptera
- Family: Tortricidae
- Tribe: Sparganothini
- Genus: Amorbimorpha; Kruse, 2012

Genus of moths

Amorbimorpha is a genus of moths belonging to the subfamily Tortricinae of the family Tortricidae.

== Species ==
- Amorbimorpha mackayiana Kruse, 2012
- Amorbimorpha powelliana Kruse, 2012
- Amorbimorpha schausiana (Walsingham, 1913)
- Amorbimorpha spadicea (Walsingham, 1913)

== See also ==
- List of Tortricidae genera
