= Coelostathma binotata =

Scientific classification
- Kingdom: Animalia
- Phylum: Arthropoda
- Class: Insecta
- Order: Lepidoptera
- Family: Tortricidae
- Genus: Coelostathma
- Species: C. binotata

Binomial name
- Coelostathma binotata Walsingham, 1913

Species of moth

Coelostathma binotata is a species of moth of the family Tortricidae. It is known from Tabasco, Mexico.
