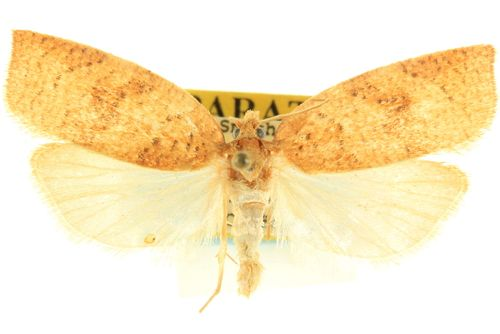

Scientific classification
- Kingdom: Animalia
- Phylum: Arthropoda
- Clade: Pancrustacea
- Class: Insecta
- Order: Lepidoptera
- Family: Tortricidae
- Genus: Amorbia
- Species: A. knudsoni

Binomial name
- Amorbia knudsoni Phillips & Powell, 2007

= Amorbia knudsoni =

Species of moth

Amorbia knudsoni is a species of moth of the family Tortricidae. It is found in the United States in western Texas, where it is found at altitudes between 1,700 and 1,900 meters.

The length of the forewings is 12–14.5 mm for males and 14–15 mm for females. Adults have been recorded on wing from May to August.

== Etymology ==
The species is named in honor of Edward C. Knudson.
