= Paramorbia =

Scientific classification
- Kingdom: Animalia
- Phylum: Arthropoda
- Clade: Pancrustacea
- Class: Insecta
- Order: Lepidoptera
- Family: Tortricidae
- Tribe: Sparganothini
- Genus: Paramorbia; Powell & Lambert, 1986

Genus of tortrix moths

Paramorbia is a genus of moths belonging to the family Tortricidae.

== Species ==
- Paramorbia aureocastanea Razowski & Wojtusiak, 2006
- Paramorbia chionophthalma (Meyrick, 1932)
- Paramorbia ithyclina (Meyrick, 1926)
- Paramorbia rostellana (Zeller, 1877)

== See also ==
- List of Tortricidae genera
