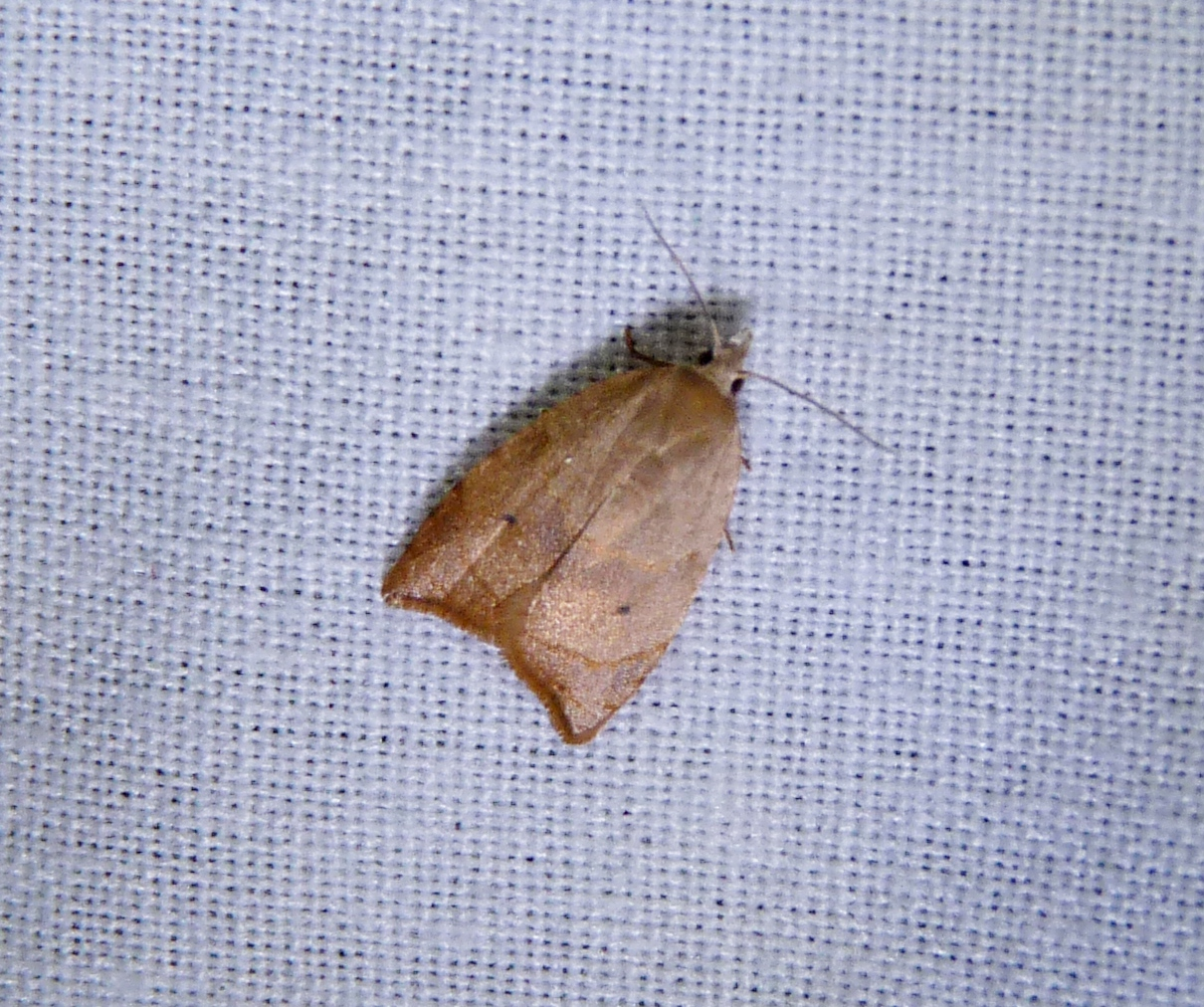
- Coelostathma discopunctana

Scientific classification
- Domain: Eukaryota
- Kingdom: Animalia
- Phylum: Arthropoda
- Class: Insecta
- Order: Lepidoptera
- Family: Tortricidae
- Tribe: Sparganothini
- Genus: Coelostathma; Clemens, 1860

Species
- 12 species (see text)

= Coelostathma =

Genus of tortrix moths

Coelostathma is a genus of moths belonging to the subfamily Tortricinae of the family Tortricidae. They occur in the Americas from eastern Canada and United States through the Caribbean and Central America to Brazil. They are small moths with whitish to fawn-brown forewings.

== Species ==
There are 12 recognized species:

- Coelostathma binotata Walsingham, 1913
- Coelostathma caerulea Landry, 2001
- Coelostathma cocoana Landry, 2001
- Coelostathma contigua Meyrick, 1926
- Coelostathma continua Landry, 2001
- Coelostathma discopunctana Clemens, 1860
- Coelostathma immutabilis Meyrick, 1926
- Coelostathma insularis Brown & Miller, 1999
- Coelostathma parallelana Walsingham, 1897
- Coelostathma placidana Powell & Brown, 2012
- Coelostathma pygmaea Landry, 2001
- Coelostathma xocoatlana Landry, 2001
