= Amorbia leptophracta =

Scientific classification
- Kingdom: Animalia
- Phylum: Arthropoda
- Clade: Pancrustacea
- Class: Insecta
- Order: Lepidoptera
- Family: Tortricidae
- Genus: Amorbia
- Species: A. leptophracta

Binomial name
- Amorbia leptophracta (Meyrick, 1931)

Synonyms
- Capua leptophracta Meyrick, 1931

Species of moth

Amorbia leptophracta is a species of moth of the family Tortricidae. It is found in Costa Rica, Colombia and Brazil.
