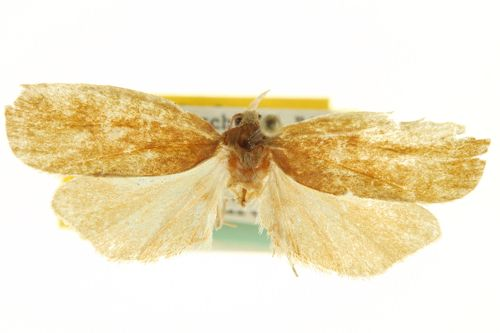

Scientific classification
- Kingdom: Animalia
- Phylum: Arthropoda
- Clade: Pancrustacea
- Class: Insecta
- Order: Lepidoptera
- Family: Tortricidae
- Genus: Amorbia
- Species: A. vero

Binomial name
- Amorbia vero Powell & Brown, 2012

= Amorbia vero =

Species of moth

Amorbia vero is a species of moth of the family Tortricidae. It is found in southern Florida.
