= Coelostathma immutabilis =

Scientific classification
- Domain: Eukaryota
- Kingdom: Animalia
- Phylum: Arthropoda
- Class: Insecta
- Order: Lepidoptera
- Family: Tortricidae
- Genus: Coelostathma
- Species: C. immutabilis

Binomial name
- Coelostathma immutabilis Meyrick, 1926

Species of moth

Coelostathma immutabilis is a species of moth of the family Tortricidae. It is known from Pará in Brazil and from Sara Province in Bolivia.

The wingspan is 9–12 mm (0.35–0.47 in).
