= Rhynchophyllis =

Scientific classification
- Kingdom: Animalia
- Phylum: Arthropoda
- Class: Insecta
- Order: Lepidoptera
- Family: Tortricidae
- Tribe: Sparganothini
- Genus: Rhynchophyllis; Meyrick, 1932

Synonyms
- Rynchophyllis Powell, Razowski & Brown, 1995

Genus of tortrix moths

Rhynchophyllis is a genus of moths belonging to the subfamily Tortricinae of the family Tortricidae.

== Species ==
- Rhynchophyllis categorica Meyrick, 1932

== See also ==
- List of Tortricidae genera
