= Coelostathma insularis =

Scientific classification
- Kingdom: Animalia
- Phylum: Arthropoda
- Class: Insecta
- Order: Lepidoptera
- Family: Tortricidae
- Genus: Coelostathma
- Species: C. insularis

Binomial name
- Coelostathma insularis Brown & Miller, 1999

Species of moth

Coelostathma insularis is a species of moth of the family Tortricidae. It is found on Cocos Island (Pacific Ocean/Costa Rica), as hinted by its specific name.

The forewing length is 6.5 mm (0.26 in) for the holotype, a male, and 6.5–6.8 mm (0.26–0.27 in) for two female paratypess.
