= Paramorbia chionophthalma =

Scientific classification
- Kingdom: Animalia
- Phylum: Arthropoda
- Class: Insecta
- Order: Lepidoptera
- Family: Tortricidae
- Genus: Paramorbia
- Species: P. chionophthalma

Binomial name
- Paramorbia chionophthalma (Meyrick, 1932)

Synonyms
- Sparganothis chionophthalma Meyrick, 1932

Species of moth

Paramorbia chionophthalma is a species of moth of the family Tortricidae. It is found in Bolivia.
