= Sparganothoides vinolenta =

Scientific classification
- Domain: Eukaryota
- Kingdom: Animalia
- Phylum: Arthropoda
- Class: Insecta
- Order: Lepidoptera
- Family: Tortricidae
- Genus: Sparganothoides
- Species: S. vinolenta

Binomial name
- Sparganothoides vinolenta (Walsingham, 1913)

Synonyms
- Epagoge vinolenta Walsingham, 1913

Species of moth

Sparganothoides vinolenta is a species of moth of the family Tortricidae. It is found in Mexico (Distrito Federal and Veracruz).

The length of the forewings is 10–12.8 mm for males and about 12.7 mm for females.
