= Amorbia exsectana =

Scientific classification
- Kingdom: Animalia
- Phylum: Arthropoda
- Clade: Pancrustacea
- Class: Insecta
- Order: Lepidoptera
- Family: Tortricidae
- Genus: Amorbia
- Species: A. exsectana

Binomial name
- Amorbia exsectana (Zeller, 1877)

Synonyms
- Oenectra exsectana Zeller, 1877

Species of moth

Amorbia exsectana is a species of moth of the family Tortricidae. It is found from Brazil to Panama, where it is found at altitudes between 1,000 and 1,500 meters.

The length of the forewings is 8.8–9.2 mm for males and 10–11 mm for females. Adults have been recorded on wing in January, May, June and October.
