= Sparganothoides probolosana =

Scientific classification
- Kingdom: Animalia
- Phylum: Arthropoda
- Clade: Pancrustacea
- Class: Insecta
- Order: Lepidoptera
- Family: Tortricidae
- Genus: Sparganothoides
- Species: S. probolosana

Binomial name
- Sparganothoides probolosana Kruse & Powell, 2009

Species of moth

Sparganothoides probolosana is a species of moth of the family Tortricidae. It is found in the Sierra Madre Occidental of western Durango in Mexico.

The length of the forewings is 10.9–12 mm.
