= Amorbia trisecta =

Scientific classification
- Kingdom: Animalia
- Phylum: Arthropoda
- Clade: Pancrustacea
- Class: Insecta
- Order: Lepidoptera
- Family: Tortricidae
- Genus: Amorbia
- Species: A. trisecta

Binomial name
- Amorbia trisecta Razowski & Wojtusiak, 2010

Species of moth

Amorbia trisecta is a species of moth of the family Tortricidae. It is known from the Yanachaga–Chemillén National Park in the Pasco Region, Peru. The type series was collected at 2,460 m (8,070 ft) above sea level.

Its wingspan is about 24 mm in males.
