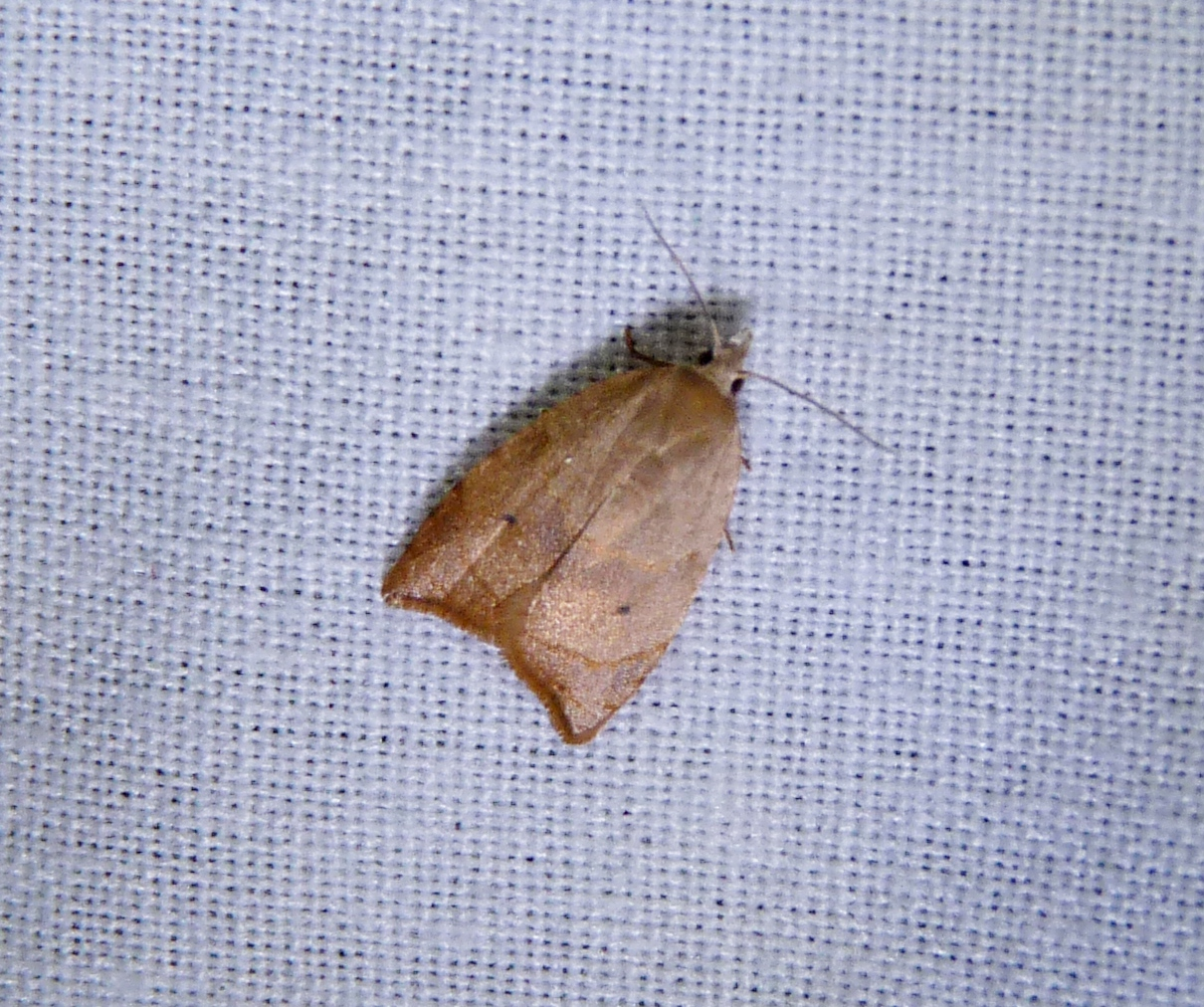

Scientific classification
- Domain: Eukaryota
- Kingdom: Animalia
- Phylum: Arthropoda
- Class: Insecta
- Order: Lepidoptera
- Family: Tortricidae
- Genus: Coelostathma
- Species: C. discopunctana

Binomial name
- Coelostathma discopunctana Clemens, 1860

Synonyms
- Coelostathma discipunctana – Walsingham, 1913

= Coelostathma discopunctana =

Species of moth

Coelostathma discopunctana, also known as the batman moth or simply the batman, is a species of moth in the family Tortricidae. It was described by James Brackenridge Clemens in 1860. The common name refers the dark forewing makings that can resemble the logo of Batman.

== Description ==
The wingspan is 11–15 mm. The batman moth rests with its forewings tucked behind its hindwings, giving the moth a flattened, rounded-triangle like shape. They have an overall light tan coloration, often with a darker patch at the lowermost margins of the forewings. There is a black dot on each forewing above this patch. They may be confused with the very similar looking Sparganothoides lentiginosana.

== Range ==
Coelostathma discopunctana is widely distributed in the eastern half of the United States and Canada, with its range extending into Mexico and the Caribbean.

== Ecology ==
Coelostathma discopunctana larvae feed on clover in the genus Trifolium.
