= Tinacrucis =

Scientific classification
- Kingdom: Animalia
- Phylum: Arthropoda
- Clade: Pancrustacea
- Class: Insecta
- Order: Lepidoptera
- Family: Tortricidae
- Tribe: Atteriini
- Genus: Tinacrucis; Powell, 1986

Genus of tortrix moths

Tinacrucis is a genus of moths belonging to the subfamily Tortricinae of the family Tortricidae.

With marked sexual dimorphism. Found in Mexico and Central America, with one species reaching the mountains of Arizona.

== Species ==
- Tinacrucis apertana (Walsingham, 1914)
- Tinacrucis aquila (Busck, 1914)
- Tinacrucis atopa Razowski & Wojtusiak, 2008
- Tinacrucis noroesta Powell, 2009
- Tinacrucis patulana (Walker, 1863)
- Tinacrucis sebasta (Walsingham, 1914)

== See also ==
- List of Tortricidae genera
