= Amorbia santamaria =

Scientific classification
- Kingdom: Animalia
- Phylum: Arthropoda
- Clade: Pancrustacea
- Class: Insecta
- Order: Lepidoptera
- Family: Tortricidae
- Genus: Amorbia
- Species: A. santamaria

Binomial name
- Amorbia santamaria Phillips & Powell, 2007

Species of moth

Amorbia santamaria is a species of moth of the family Tortricidae. It is found in Costa Rica and Guatemala.

The length of the forewings is 11.5–12.2 mm for males and 13–14 mm for females.

== Etymology ==
The species name refers to the type locality, Santa María volcano in Guatemala.
