= Archipimima labyrinthopa =

Scientific classification
- Kingdom: Animalia
- Phylum: Arthropoda
- Class: Insecta
- Order: Lepidoptera
- Family: Tortricidae
- Genus: Archipimima
- Species: A. labyrinthopa

Binomial name
- Archipimima labyrinthopa (Meyrick, 1932)

Synonyms
- Cacoecia labyrinthopa Meyrick, 1932; Sisurcana labyrinthopa

Species of moth

Archipimima labyrinthopa is a species of moth of the family Tortricidae. It is found in Brazil in the states of Santa Catarina and Paraná.

The wingspan is about 17 mm.
