= Archipimima cosmoscelis =

Scientific classification
- Kingdom: Animalia
- Phylum: Arthropoda
- Class: Insecta
- Order: Lepidoptera
- Family: Tortricidae
- Genus: Archipimima
- Species: A. cosmoscelis

Binomial name
- Archipimima cosmoscelis (Meyrick, 1932)

Synonyms
- Tortrix cosmoscelis Meyrick, 1932

Species of moth

Archipimima cosmoscelis is a species of moth of the family Tortricidae. It is found in Santa Catarina, Brazil.
