= Sparganothoides torusana =

Scientific classification
- Kingdom: Animalia
- Phylum: Arthropoda
- Clade: Pancrustacea
- Class: Insecta
- Order: Lepidoptera
- Family: Tortricidae
- Genus: Sparganothoides
- Species: S. torusana

Binomial name
- Sparganothoides torusana Kruse & Powell, 2009

Species of moth

Sparganothoides torusana is a species of moth of the family Tortricidae. It is found in Mexico (Veracruz) and Costa Rica.

The length of the forewings is 6.1–7 mm for males and 6.8–7.4 mm for females. Adults have been recorded on wing in July and October in Mexico and in October, December and March in Costa Rica.

== Etymology ==
The species name refers to the protuberances of the head and is derived from Latin torus (meaning a round swelling).
