= Amorbia rhombobasis =

Scientific classification
- Kingdom: Animalia
- Phylum: Arthropoda
- Clade: Pancrustacea
- Class: Insecta
- Order: Lepidoptera
- Family: Tortricidae
- Genus: Amorbia
- Species: A. rhombobasis

Binomial name
- Amorbia rhombobasis Phillips & Powell, 2007

Species of moth

Amorbia rhombobasis is a species of moth of the family Tortricidae. It is found in Bolivia, Brazil, Costa Rica and Venezuela, where it is found at altitudes between 600 and 1,760 meters.

The length of the forewings is 9.7–11.2 mm for males and 12.0–14.0 mm for females.
