= Coelostathma parallelana =

Scientific classification
- Domain: Eukaryota
- Kingdom: Animalia
- Phylum: Arthropoda
- Class: Insecta
- Order: Lepidoptera
- Family: Tortricidae
- Genus: Coelostathma
- Species: C. parallelana

Binomial name
- Coelostathma parallelana Walsingham, 1897

Species of moth

Coelostathma parallelana is a species of moth of the family Tortricidae. It is found on Saint Thomas (the Virgin Islands), Cuba, and Hispaniola.

The wingspan is 12 mm (0.47 in). The larvae feed on Acacia farnesiana.
