= Sparganothoides albescens =

Scientific classification
- Domain: Eukaryota
- Kingdom: Animalia
- Phylum: Arthropoda
- Class: Insecta
- Order: Lepidoptera
- Family: Tortricidae
- Genus: Sparganothoides
- Species: S. albescens

Binomial name
- Sparganothoides albescens (Walsingham, 1913)

Synonyms
- Platynota albescens Walsingham, 1913

Species of moth

Sparganothoides albescens is a species of moth of the family Tortricidae. It is found in Guerrero, Mexico.

The length of the forewings is about 8.1 mm.
