= Tinacrucis noroesta =

Scientific classification
- Kingdom: Animalia
- Phylum: Arthropoda
- Clade: Pancrustacea
- Class: Insecta
- Order: Lepidoptera
- Family: Tortricidae
- Genus: Tinacrucis
- Species: T. noroesta

Binomial name
- Tinacrucis noroesta Powell, 2009

Species of moth

Tinacrucis noroesta is a species of moth of the family Tortricidae. It is found in North America in Arizona, New Mexico, Chihuahua and Durango.

The wingspan is 29–37 mm.
