= Sparganothoides silaceana =

Scientific classification
- Kingdom: Animalia
- Phylum: Arthropoda
- Clade: Pancrustacea
- Class: Insecta
- Order: Lepidoptera
- Family: Tortricidae
- Genus: Sparganothoides
- Species: S. silaceana

Binomial name
- Sparganothoides silaceana Kruse & Powell, 2009

Species of moth

Sparganothoides silaceana is a species of moth of the family Tortricidae. It is found only near Cerro de la Muerte and Poás Volcano in Costa Rica.

The length of the forewings is 9.2–9.9 mm for males and 9.4–10.4 mm for females. Adults have been recorded on wing in April, May and July, probably in two generations per year.

== Etymology ==
The species name refers to the coloration of the forewings and is derived from Latin silaceus (meaning ochre).
