= Sparganothoides lugens =

Scientific classification
- Domain: Eukaryota
- Kingdom: Animalia
- Phylum: Arthropoda
- Class: Insecta
- Order: Lepidoptera
- Family: Tortricidae
- Genus: Sparganothoides
- Species: S. lugens

Binomial name
- Sparganothoides lugens (Walsingham, 1913)

Synonyms
- Sparganothis lugens Walsingham, 1913

Species of moth

Sparganothoides lugens is a species of moth of the family Tortricidae. It is found from southern Mexico to Costa Rica.

The length of the forewings is 8.1–9.2 mm for males and 8.8–11.1 mm for females. Adults are on wing from early June to mid-August in southern Mexico and in March and June in Costa Rica.

Larvae have been recorded feeding on various leaves and have been reared on lettuce.
