= Coelostathma caerulea =

Scientific classification
- Kingdom: Animalia
- Phylum: Arthropoda
- Clade: Pancrustacea
- Class: Insecta
- Order: Lepidoptera
- Family: Tortricidae
- Genus: Coelostathma
- Species: C. caerulea

Binomial name
- Coelostathma caerulea Landry in Landry & Powell, 2001

Species of moth

Coelostathma caerulea is a species of moth of the family Tortricidae. It is found on Cocos Island (Pacific Ocean/Costa Rica).

The forewing length is 4.3–4.8 mm (0.17–0.19 in) in males and 4.2–4.5 mm (0.17–0.18 in) in females. The forewings and thorax are blackish brown and have shiny blue spots – hence the specific name caerulea, from Latin caeruleus, meaning "sky-blue".
