= Niasoma metallicana =

Scientific classification
- Kingdom: Animalia
- Phylum: Arthropoda
- Class: Insecta
- Order: Lepidoptera
- Family: Tortricidae
- Genus: Niasoma
- Species: N. metallicana

Binomial name
- Niasoma metallicana (Walsingham, 1895)

Synonyms
- Platynota metallicana Walsingham, 1895

Species of moth

Niasoma metallicana is a species of moth of the family Tortricidae. It is found in the United States in the states of Florida, Louisiana, Maryland, Massachusetts, Mississippi, New Jersey and Texas.

The wingspan is 14–21 mm.
