= Coelostathma pygmaea =

Scientific classification
- Kingdom: Animalia
- Phylum: Arthropoda
- Clade: Pancrustacea
- Class: Insecta
- Order: Lepidoptera
- Family: Tortricidae
- Genus: Coelostathma
- Species: C. pygmaea

Binomial name
- Coelostathma pygmaea Landry in Landry & Powell, 2001

Species of moth

Coelostathma pygmaea is a species of moth of the family Tortricidae. It is endemic to Costa Rica and known from elevations between 50 and 100 m (160 and 330 ft) above sea level.

The forewing length is 3.8–4.2 mm (0.15–0.17 in) in males; females are unknown. The forewings are golden brown. The thorax is dark brown.
