= Amorbia colubrana =

Scientific classification
- Kingdom: Animalia
- Phylum: Arthropoda
- Clade: Pancrustacea
- Class: Insecta
- Order: Lepidoptera
- Family: Tortricidae
- Genus: Amorbia
- Species: A. colubrana

Binomial name
- Amorbia colubrana (Zeller, 1866)

Synonyms
- Tortrix colubrana Zeller, 1866

Species of moth

Amorbia colubrana is a species of moth of the family Tortricidae. It is found in Ecuador (Carchi Province, Pichincha Province and Napo Province), Peru and Colombia. It is found at altitudes above 2,000 meters.

The length of the forewings is 13–14 mm.
