= Amorbia cacoa =

Scientific classification
- Domain: Eukaryota
- Kingdom: Animalia
- Phylum: Arthropoda
- Class: Insecta
- Order: Lepidoptera
- Family: Tortricidae
- Genus: Amorbia
- Species: A. cacoa

Binomial name
- Amorbia cacoa Phillips & Polwell, 2007

Synonyms
- Amorbia cocoa

Species of moth

Amorbia cacoa is a species of moth of the family Tortricidae. It is found in Costa Rica, Guatemala and Napo Province, Ecuador. It is found at altitudes between 1,000 and 1,400 meters.

The length of the forewings is 10.4–12 mm for males and 12.8–16 mm for females.

The larvae feed on Erechtites hieracifolia, Inga species (including Inga longispica), Xylosma chlorantha, Alfaroa guanacastensis, Beilschmiedia species, Ocotea species (including Ocotea veraguensis), Licaria species, Cinnamomum brenesii, Rosa sinensis, Meliosma glabrata and Chrysochlamys glauca. Full-grown larvae reach a length of 25 mm.
