= Sparganothoides morata =

Scientific classification
- Domain: Eukaryota
- Kingdom: Animalia
- Phylum: Arthropoda
- Class: Insecta
- Order: Lepidoptera
- Family: Tortricidae
- Genus: Sparganothoides
- Species: S. morata

Binomial name
- Sparganothoides morata (Walsingham, 1913)

Synonyms
- Sparganothis morata Walsingham, 1913

Species of moth

Sparganothoides morata is a species of moth of the family Tortricidae. It is found in Panama, Venezuela and Trinidad.

The length of the forewings is 5.8–6 mm for males and 5.9–7.1 mm for females. Adults have been recorded on wing from October to March, probably in multiple generations per year.
