= Archipimima =

Scientific classification
- Kingdom: Animalia
- Phylum: Arthropoda
- Clade: Pancrustacea
- Class: Insecta
- Order: Lepidoptera
- Family: Tortricidae
- Tribe: Atteriini
- Genus: Archipimima; Powell, 1986

Synonyms
- Archipimina Razowski & Wojtusiak, 2010

Genus of tortrix moths

Archipimima is a genus of moths belonging to the family Tortricidae.

== Species ==
- Archipimima archipiforma Razowski & Pelz, 2004
- Archipimima concavata (Meyrick, 1930)
- Archipimima consentanea Razowski, 2004
- Archipimima cosmoscelis (Meyrick, 1932)
- Archipimima flexicostalis (Dognin, 1908)
- Archipimima labyrinthopa (Meyrick, 1932)
- Archipimima sinuocostana Razowski & Wojtusiak, 2006
- Archipimima telemaco Razowski & Becker, 2011
- Archipimima tylonota (Meyrick, 1926)
- Archipimima vermelhana Razowski, 2004
- Archipimima yanachagae Razowski & Wojtusiak, 2010

== See also ==
- List of Tortricidae genera
