= Amorbia laterculana =

Scientific classification
- Kingdom: Animalia
- Phylum: Arthropoda
- Clade: Pancrustacea
- Class: Insecta
- Order: Lepidoptera
- Family: Tortricidae
- Genus: Amorbia
- Species: A. laterculana

Binomial name
- Amorbia laterculana (Zeller, 1877)

Synonyms
- Oenectra laterculana Zeller, 1877

Species of moth

Amorbia laterculana is a species of moth of the family Tortricidae. It is found from Guatemala to Sinaloa in Mexico, where it is found at altitudes between 1,700 and 2,800 meters.

The length of the forewings is 12.3–14 mm for males and 13–17 mm for females. Adults are on wing from May to November, as well as in February.

The larvae feed on Lantana camara.
