= Archipimima yanachagae =

Scientific classification
- Kingdom: Animalia
- Phylum: Arthropoda
- Class: Insecta
- Order: Lepidoptera
- Family: Tortricidae
- Genus: Archipimima
- Species: A. yanachagae

Binomial name
- Archipimima yanachagae Razowski & Wojtusiak, 2010

Species of moth

Archipimima yanachagae is a species of moth of the family Tortricidae. It is known from the Yanachaga–Chemillén National Park in Peru. The type series was collected at 1,050 m (3,440 ft) above sea level.

The wingspan is about 23 mm.

== Etymology ==
The specific name refers to its type locality, the Yanachaga–Chemillén National Park.
