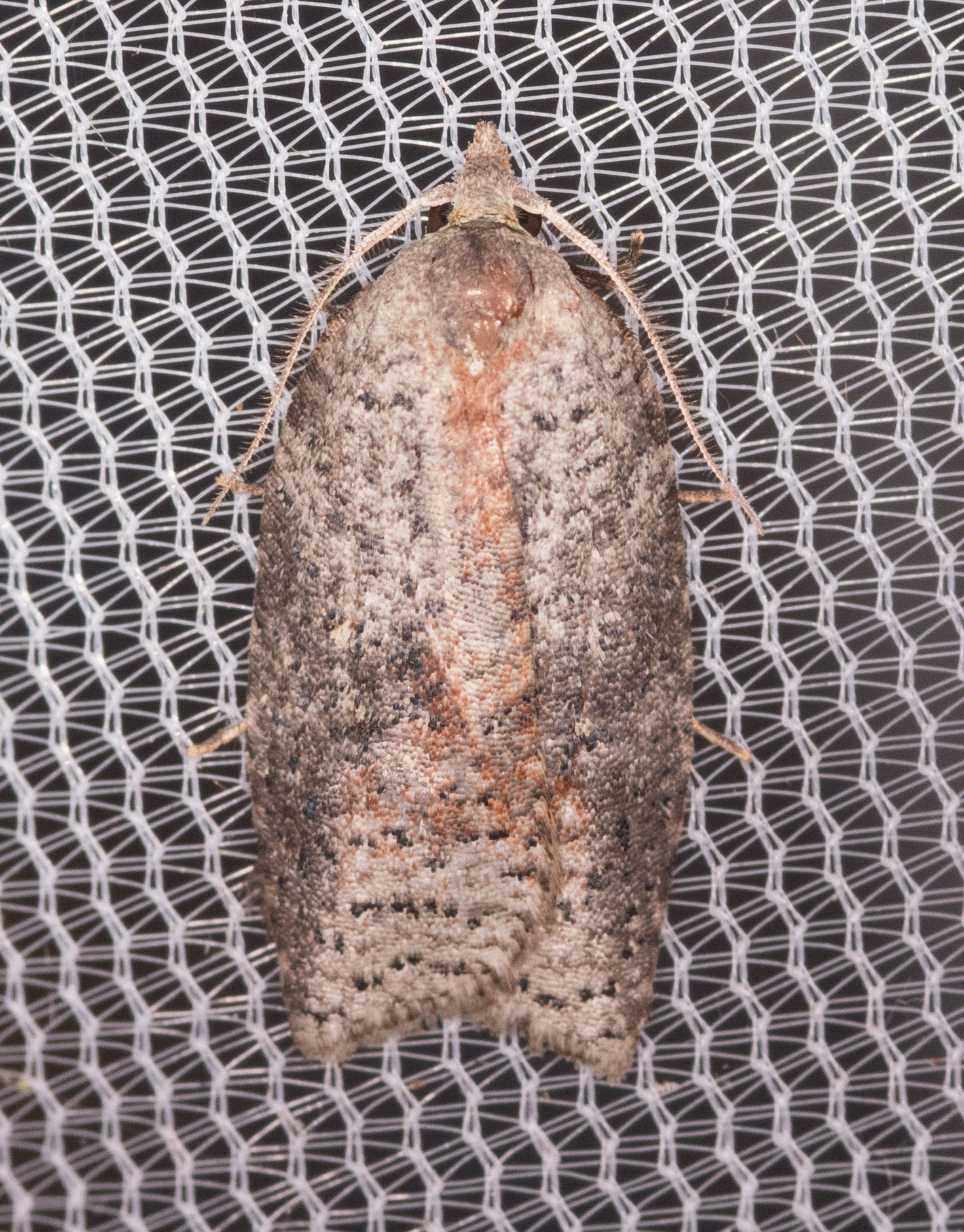

Scientific classification
- Kingdom: Animalia
- Phylum: Arthropoda
- Clade: Pancrustacea
- Class: Insecta
- Order: Lepidoptera
- Family: Tortricidae
- Genus: Amorbia
- Species: A. humerosana

Binomial name
- Amorbia humerosana Clemens, 1860

= Amorbia humerosana =

Species of moth

Amorbia humerosana, the white-lined leafroller, is a species of moth of the family Tortricidae. It is found from the Gulf states to the northeastern United States and southeastern Canada.

The length of the forewings is 11–13 mm for males and 12–13.5 mm for females. Adults are on wing from March to September.

The larvae feed on Picea glauca, Picea rubens, Pinus species (including Pinus banksiana), Abies balsamea, Larix laricina, Viburnum species, Rhus radicans, Rhus aromatica, Aralia species, Solidago species, Alnus species, Betula species, Castanea dentata, Lindera species, Asparagus officinalis, Gaylussacia species, Malus domestica and Salix species. They roll the leaves of their host plants. Full-grown larvae reach a length of about 25 mm.
