= Paramorbia aureocastanea =

Scientific classification
- Kingdom: Animalia
- Phylum: Arthropoda
- Class: Insecta
- Order: Lepidoptera
- Family: Tortricidae
- Genus: Paramorbia
- Species: P. aureocastanea

Binomial name
- Paramorbia aureocastanea Razowski & Wojtusiak, 2006

Species of moth

Paramorbia aureocastanea is a species of moth of the family Tortricidae. It is found in Ecuador (Morona-Santiago Province and Carchi Province).

== Description ==
The wingspan is 27–30 millimetres (1.1–1.2 in) for males and 34 millimetres (1.3 in) for females.
