= Amorbimorpha mackayiana =

Scientific classification
- Domain: Eukaryota
- Kingdom: Animalia
- Phylum: Arthropoda
- Class: Insecta
- Order: Lepidoptera
- Family: Tortricidae
- Genus: Amorbimorpha
- Species: A. mackayiana

Binomial name
- Amorbimorpha mackayiana Kruse, 2012

Species of moth

Amorbimorpha mackayiana is a species of moth of the family Tortricidae. It is found in the United States in western Texas and possibly northern Mexico.

The length of the forewings is 9.7–12.8 mm for males and 11.8–13.4 mm for females. Adults have been recorded on wing from late March to early June and again in mid-September, probably in two or more generations per year.

== Etymology ==
The species is names in honor of Margaret MacKay, a tortricid systematist and collector of the first known specimens of the species.
