= Amorbimorpha spadicea =

Scientific classification
- Domain: Eukaryota
- Kingdom: Animalia
- Phylum: Arthropoda
- Class: Insecta
- Order: Lepidoptera
- Family: Tortricidae
- Genus: Amorbimorpha
- Species: A. spadicea

Binomial name
- Amorbimorpha spadicea (Walsingham, 1913)

Synonyms
- Epagoge spadicea Walsingham, 1913; Sparganothoides spadicea

Species of moth

Amorbimorpha spadicea is a species of moth of the family Tortricidae. It is found in Guerrero, Mexico.

The length of the forewings is about 13 mm. Adults have been recorded on wing in August.
