= Sparganothoides teratana =

Scientific classification
- Kingdom: Animalia
- Phylum: Arthropoda
- Clade: Pancrustacea
- Class: Insecta
- Order: Lepidoptera
- Family: Tortricidae
- Genus: Sparganothoides
- Species: S. teratana

Binomial name
- Sparganothoides teratana (Zeller, 1877)

Synonyms
- Tortrix (Batodes) teratana Zeller, 1877; Amorbia teratana

Species of moth

Sparganothoides teratana is a species of moth of the family Tortricidae. It is found in Panama and Honduras.

The length of the forewings is 8.1–9.1 mm.
