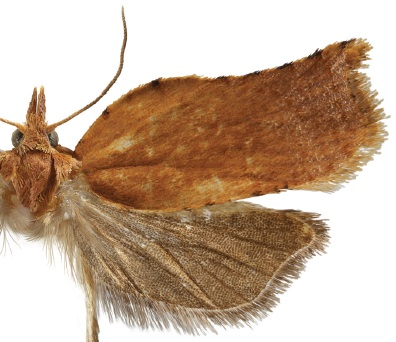

Scientific classification
- Domain: Eukaryota
- Kingdom: Animalia
- Phylum: Arthropoda
- Class: Insecta
- Order: Lepidoptera
- Family: Tortricidae
- Genus: Circanota
- Species: C. undulata

Binomial name
- Circanota undulata Brown, 2014

= Circanota undulata =

Species of moth

Circanota undulata is a species of moth of the family Tortricidae. It is found in Costa Rica and Panama, at altitudes below about 900 meters.

The length of the forewings is 4.9–5.5 mm for males and 5–5.9 mm for females. The forewings are fawn brown mixed throughout with pale orange brown, with faint, narrow, variable traces of slightly darker post-median and subterminal fasciae, and a few short darker strigulae along the costa. There is a well developed costal fold occupying the straight basal 0.4 of the costa. The hindwings are uniform dark grey brown. The female forewings are slightly darker overall. Adults have been recorded on wing from January to May.

== Etymology ==
The species name refers to the undulate costa of the forewing.
