= Sparganothoides machimiana =

Scientific classification
- Kingdom: Animalia
- Phylum: Arthropoda
- Class: Insecta
- Order: Lepidoptera
- Family: Tortricidae
- Genus: Sparganothoides
- Species: S. machimiana

Binomial name
- Sparganothoides machimiana (Barnes & Busck, 1920)

Synonyms
- Sparganothis machimiana Barnes & Busck, 1920

Species of moth

Sparganothoides machimiana is a species of moth of the family Tortricidae described by William Barnes and August Busck in 1920. It is found from the mountains and woodlands of Arizona, Colorado and New Mexico in the United States south to Durango in Mexico. The habitat consists of mixed forests and oak woodlands.

The length of the forewings is 8.1–10.4 mm for males and 9.2–10.8 mm for females. Adults are on wing from late June to mid-September.

The larvae feed on Quercus (including Quercus hypoleucoides and Quercus emoryi) and Arctostaphylos species.
