= Archipimima concavata =

Scientific classification
- Kingdom: Animalia
- Phylum: Arthropoda
- Class: Insecta
- Order: Lepidoptera
- Family: Tortricidae
- Genus: Archipimima
- Species: A. concavata

Binomial name
- Archipimima concavata (Meyrick, 1930)

Synonyms
- Cacoecia concavata Meyrick, 1930

Species of moth

Archipimima concavata is a species of moth of the family Tortricidae. It is known from Peru (Chachapoyas province (2,400 asl) and Agualani, Sandia province).
