= Amorbimorpha schausiana =

Scientific classification
- Domain: Eukaryota
- Kingdom: Animalia
- Phylum: Arthropoda
- Class: Insecta
- Order: Lepidoptera
- Family: Tortricidae
- Genus: Amorbimorpha
- Species: A. schausiana

Binomial name
- Amorbimorpha schausiana (Walsingham, 1913)

Synonyms
- Epagoge schausiana Walsingham, 1913; Sparganothoides schausiana

Species of moth

Amorbimorpha schausiana is a species of moth of the family Tortricidae. It is found in south-eastern Mexico including Veracruz.

The length of the forewings is 14.2–16.8 mm for males and about 14 mm for females. Adults have been recorded on wing from early June to mid-July.
