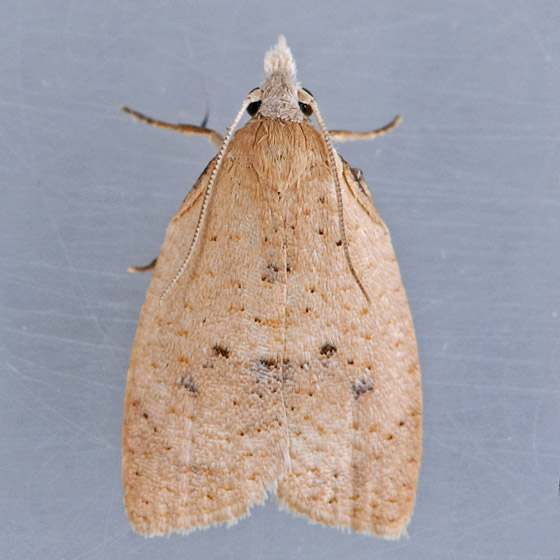
- Sparganothoides lentiginosana

Scientific classification
- Domain: Eukaryota
- Kingdom: Animalia
- Phylum: Arthropoda
- Class: Insecta
- Order: Lepidoptera
- Family: Tortricidae
- Genus: Sparganothoides
- Species: S. lentiginosana

Binomial name
- Sparganothoides lentiginosana (Walsingham, 1879)

Synonyms
- Capua lentiginosana Walsingham, 1879; Sparganothis lentiginosana

= Sparganothoides lentiginosana =

Species of moth

Sparganothoides lentiginosana, the lentiginos moth, is a species of moth of the family Tortricidae. It is found in the United States from Maryland to Florida, west to Arkansas, Texas and Oklahoma, ranging south to Mexico in Tamaulipas and Veracruz.

The length of the forewings is 6–6.5 mm for males and 6.3–7.4 mm for females. Adults have been recorded year round, except November and December. There are several generations per year.
