= Tinacrucis patulana =

Scientific classification
- Kingdom: Animalia
- Phylum: Arthropoda
- Class: Insecta
- Order: Lepidoptera
- Family: Tortricidae
- Genus: Tinacrucis
- Species: T. patulana

Binomial name
- Tinacrucis patulana (Walker, 1863)

Synonyms
- Tortrix patulana Walker, 1863; Aesiocopa patulana

Species of moth

Tinacrucis patulana is a species of moth belonging to the subfamily Tortricinae of the family Tortricidae.

== Description ==
Tinacrucis patulana has a wingspan of about 1 centimeter. The basic color is pale brown with ashen reflections and dark brown drawings.

== Behavior ==
This species protects their eggs building a fence around them. The moth deposits a flat circular mass of about 300 greenish eggs in about six hours. The eggs are surrounded by a circular stockade of about 3000 elongate scales, with the purpose to keep out ants or mites. These scales come from the tip of the abdomen of the moth. The caterpillars hatch after eleven days and then they escape over the stockade by spinning a ramp of silk.

== Distribution and habitat ==
Tinacrucis patulana has been found in Mexico (Oaxaca), Costa Rica, and in the jungle of Venezuela.
