= Scrobipalpula psilella =

Scientific classification
- Kingdom: Animalia
- Phylum: Arthropoda
- Clade: Pancrustacea
- Class: Insecta
- Order: Lepidoptera
- Family: Gelechiidae
- Genus: Scrobipalpula
- Species: S. psilella

Binomial name
- Scrobipalpula psilella (Herrich-Schäffer, 1854)

Synonyms
- Gelechia psilella Herrich-Schäffer, 1854; Gnorimoschema psilellum; Lita psilella; Phthorimaea psilella; Gelechia nocturnella Staudinger, 1859; Lita pallidella Heinemann, 1870; Gelechia killiasii Frey, 1880; Aristotelia imperatella Dumont, 1931; Gnorimoschema psilellum astericolellum Hering, 1957; Scrobipalpula psilella asiatica Povolný, 1968

Species of moth

Scrobipalpula psilella is a moth of the family Gelechiidae. It is widely distributed throughout the Palaearctic region. It has also been recorded from North America.

The wingspan is 11–13 mm. Adults are on wing in August.

The larvae feed on Artemisia campestris, Artemisia maritima, Artemisia santonicum, Artemisia vulgaris, Aster alpinus, Aster amellus, Aster tripolium, Centaurea scabiosa, Erigeron acer, Gnaphalium species and Helichrysum arenarium. Larvae can be found from May to June and again in September. They are green with a light grey head.
