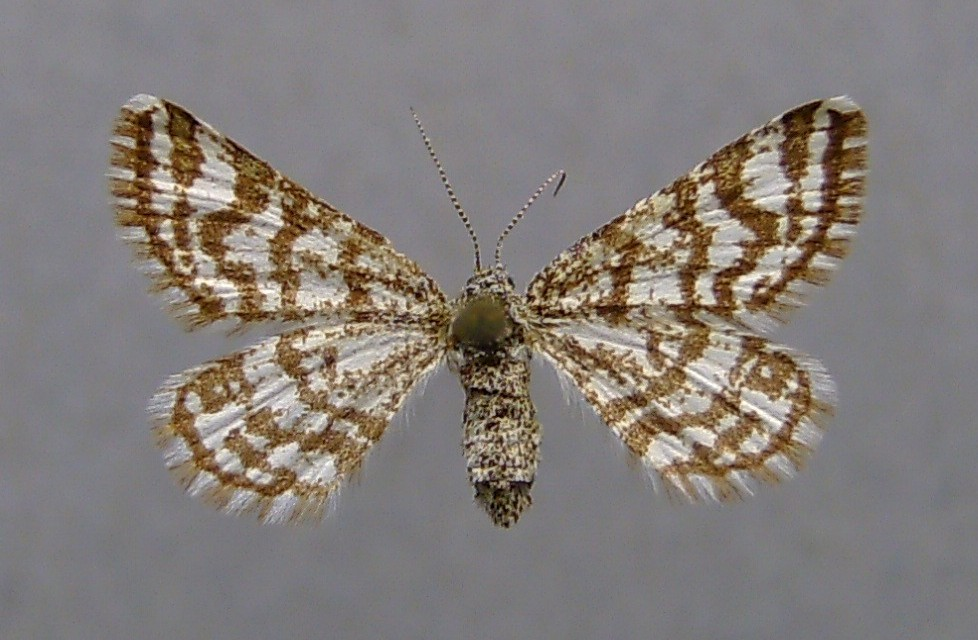
- Female
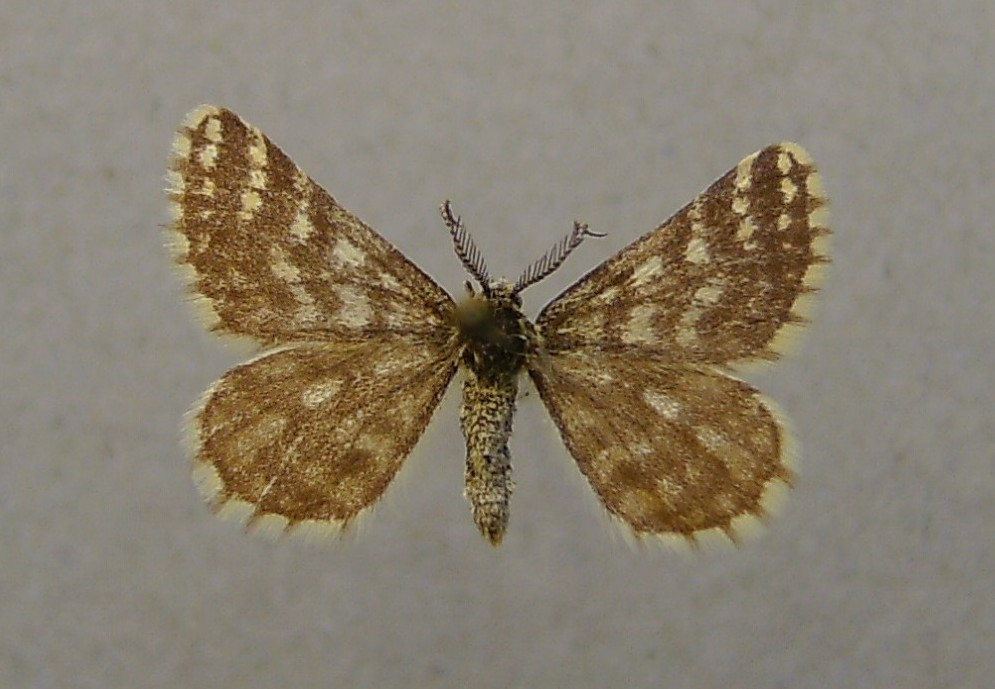
- Male

Scientific classification
- Domain: Eukaryota
- Kingdom: Animalia
- Phylum: Arthropoda
- Class: Insecta
- Order: Lepidoptera
- Family: Geometridae
- Genus: Narraga
- Species: N. tessularia

Binomial name
- Narraga tessularia (Metzner, 1845)

Synonyms
- Geometra tessularia Metzner, 1845; Narraga pannonica Vojnits, 1977

= Narraga tessularia =

Species of moth

Narraga tessularia is a moth of the family Geometridae. It is found in Slovakia, Austria, Hungary, Romania, Bulgaria and Russia.

The wingspan is 12–15 mm for females and 15–18 mm for males. There are two generations per year. Adults of the first generation appear in May from overwintering pupa. The second generation appears in July.

The larvae feed on the leaves of Artemisia maritima. Pupation takes place in a cocoon in the soil.

== Subspecies ==
- Narraga tessularia tessularia (Russian steppe)
- Narraga tessularia ilia Wehrli, 1940 (Bulgaria, Romania and Slovakia)
- Narraga tessularia kasyi Moucha & Povolny, 1957 (Hungary and Burgenland)
