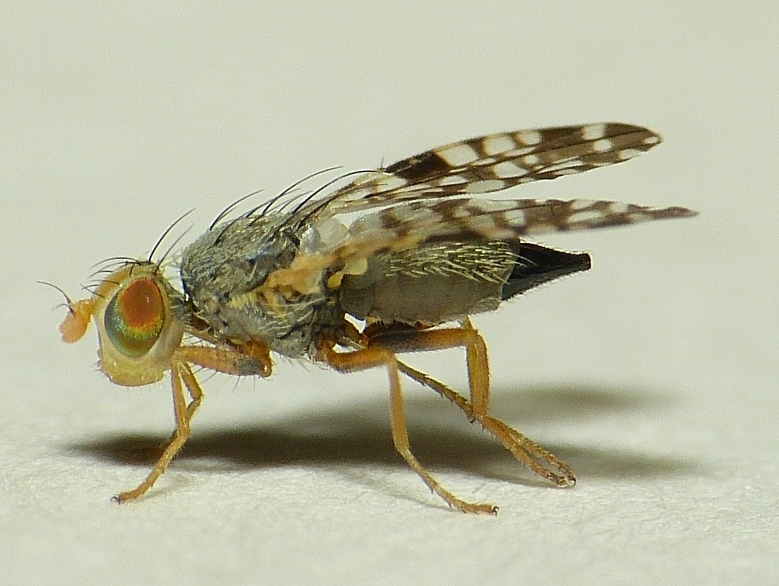

Scientific classification
- Kingdom: Animalia
- Phylum: Arthropoda
- Clade: Pancrustacea
- Class: Insecta
- Order: Diptera
- Family: Tephritidae
- Subfamily: Tephritinae
- Tribe: Tephritini
- Genus: Campiglossa
- Species: C. absinthii

Binomial name
- Campiglossa absinthii (Fabricius, 1805)

Synonyms
- Musca cinereus Harris, 1780; Musca cinerius Harris, 1780; Tephritis absinthii Fabricius, 1805; Tephritis alethe Newman, 1833; Oxyna parvula Loew, 1862; Oxyna absynthii Rondani, 1870; Oxyna dracunculi Rondani, 1870; Paroxyna absynthi Hendel, 1934; Paroxyna absintii Persson, 1958

= Campiglossa absinthii =

Species of fly

Campiglossa absinthii is a species of fly in the family Tephritidae, the gall flies. The species is found in the Palearctic. Long. : 3-4 mm. The body is ashy grey; the humeral callus and part of pleura yellowish. The mesonotum has three or five more or less distinct brown bands. The legs are sometimes entirely rufous. The wings are opaline with brown spots. The larvae feed on Asteraceae, including Artemisia maritima and Artemisia vulgaris.
