= Scrobipalpula artemisiella =

Scientific classification
- Domain: Eukaryota
- Kingdom: Animalia
- Phylum: Arthropoda
- Class: Insecta
- Order: Lepidoptera
- Family: Gelechiidae
- Genus: Scrobipalpula
- Species: S. artemisiella

Binomial name
- Scrobipalpula artemisiella Kearfott, 1903

Synonyms
- Gnorimoschema artemisiella Kearfott, 1903; Phthorimaea axenopis Meyrick, 1919

Species of moth

Scrobipalpula artemisiella, the thyme moth, is a moth in the family Gelechiidae. It was described by William D. Kearfott in 1903. It is found in the United States, where it has been recorded from California, Arizona, Illinois, Maine, Maryland and Ohio.

The wingspan is 9–11 mm. The forewings are ocherous, pink, or terracotta, heavily overlaid with streaks and bands of mottled gray and black, running parallel to the costa. The costa is narrowly edged with this secondary color, a streak from the base along the median line curving into the costa at one half. This color also predominates along the inner margin. On the apical third the black and gray dots are formed into narrow streaks or dashes radiating to the outer edge and extending over the cilia. There are three small black dots of raised scales, one on the costa at the inner fourth, one in the cell just before the outer end and one on the median line beyond the cell. There is a considerable degree of variation between specimens, some are so heavily overlaid with the secondary color that the ground color is reduced to three narrow streaks, one just below the costa, one along the median line and the lower one in fold, these only extending to the end of the cell with just a bare indication of the ground color on the outer half between the nearly parallel radiating lines of the secondary color. In other specimens the ground color occupies more than half of the inner half and extending down to the inner margin. The hindwings are light gray.

The larvae feed on Artemisia canadensis. They web together the terminal leaves and partially excavate the tip of the twig and feed close to the bases of the leaves.
