= Scrobipalpula hodgesi =

Scientific classification
- Kingdom: Animalia
- Phylum: Arthropoda
- Clade: Pancrustacea
- Class: Insecta
- Order: Lepidoptera
- Family: Gelechiidae
- Genus: Scrobipalpula
- Species: S. hodgesi

Binomial name
- Scrobipalpula hodgesi (Povolný, 1967)

Synonyms
- Ephysteris hodgesi Povolný, 1967

Species of moth

Scrobipalpula hodgesi is a moth in the family Gelechiidae. It was described by Povolný in 1967. It is found in North America, where it has been recorded from Arizona.
