= Scrobipalpula crustaria =

Scientific classification
- Kingdom: Animalia
- Phylum: Arthropoda
- Clade: Pancrustacea
- Class: Insecta
- Order: Lepidoptera
- Family: Gelechiidae
- Genus: Scrobipalpula
- Species: S. crustaria

Binomial name
- Scrobipalpula crustaria (Meyrick, 1917)

Synonyms
- Phthorimaea crustaria Meyrick, 1917

Species of moth

Scrobipalpula crustaria is a moth in the family Gelechiidae. It was first described by Meyrick in 1917 and is found in Peru.

== Description ==
The wingspan is 10–13 mm. The forewings are ochreous whitish, irregularly and variably sprinkled with grey, ochreous and blackish. There are small cloudy spots of blackish sprinkles on the costa at the base and one fourth, and a cloudy blackish dot on the fold near the base. The stigmata are rather large, black and sometimes ringed with ochreous, the plical rather obliquely before the first discal. There are sometimes indications of cloudy dots of blackish sprinkles on the costa posteriorly and termen (jin). The hindwings are slaty grey.
