= Scrobipalpula antiochia =

Scientific classification
- Kingdom: Animalia
- Phylum: Arthropoda
- Clade: Pancrustacea
- Class: Insecta
- Order: Lepidoptera
- Family: Gelechiidae
- Genus: Scrobipalpula
- Species: S. antiochia

Binomial name
- Scrobipalpula antiochia Powell and Povolný, 2001

Synonyms
- Scrobipalpula antiocha

Species of moth

Scrobipalpula antiochia is a moth in the family Gelechiidae. It was described by Powell and Povolný in 2001. It is found in North America, where it has been recorded from California.

The larvae feed on Senecio douglasii, within terminal shelters in new foliage.
