= Scrobipalpula gregariella =

Scientific classification
- Kingdom: Animalia
- Phylum: Arthropoda
- Clade: Pancrustacea
- Class: Insecta
- Order: Lepidoptera
- Family: Gelechiidae
- Genus: Scrobipalpula
- Species: S. gregariella

Binomial name
- Scrobipalpula gregariella (Zeller, 1877)

Synonyms
- Lita gregariella Zeller, 1877

Species of moth

Scrobipalpula gregariella is a moth in the family Gelechiidae. It was described by Philipp Christoph Zeller in 1877. It is found in Colombia.
