= Scrobipalpula radiatella =

Scientific classification
- Domain: Eukaryota
- Kingdom: Animalia
- Phylum: Arthropoda
- Class: Insecta
- Order: Lepidoptera
- Family: Gelechiidae
- Genus: Scrobipalpula
- Species: S. radiatella

Binomial name
- Scrobipalpula radiatella (Busck, 1904)

Synonyms
- Gnorimoschema radiatella Busck, 1904

Species of moth

Scrobipalpula radiatella is a moth in the family Gelechiidae. It was described by August Busck in 1904. It is found in North America, where it has been recorded from Washington state.

The wingspan is about 16 mm. There is a nearly continuous, narrow black longitudinal central line from the base to the apex with the costal part of the wing above this line light whitish red, shaded with fuscous. The dorsal part below the central black line is darker than the costal half, reddish, more profusely overlaid with dark fuscous and black scales. At the base is an ill-defined, small, unmottled brick-red patch. The hindwings are light fuscous.
