= Scrobipalpula daturae =

Scientific classification
- Kingdom: Animalia
- Phylum: Arthropoda
- Clade: Pancrustacea
- Class: Insecta
- Order: Lepidoptera
- Family: Gelechiidae
- Genus: Scrobipalpula
- Species: S. daturae

Binomial name
- Scrobipalpula daturae Zeller, 1877

Synonyms
- Gelechia (Doryphora) daturae Zeller, 1877

Species of moth

Scrobipalpula daturae is a moth in the family Gelechiidae. It was described by Philipp Christoph Zeller in 1877. It is found in Colombia.
