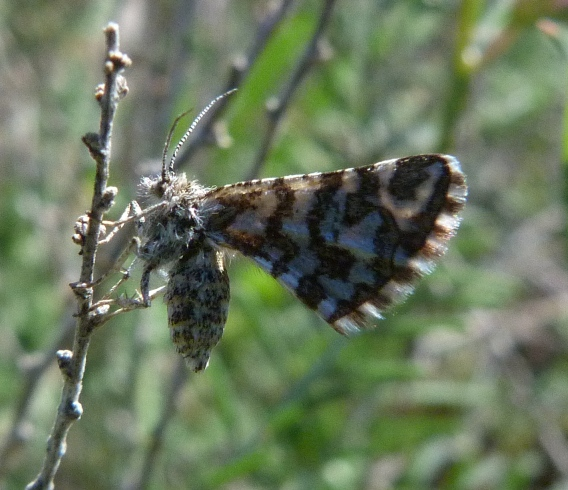

Scientific classification
- Domain: Eukaryota
- Kingdom: Animalia
- Phylum: Arthropoda
- Class: Insecta
- Order: Lepidoptera
- Family: Geometridae
- Genus: Narraga
- Species: N. nelvae

Binomial name
- Narraga nelvae (Rothschild, 1912)

Synonyms
- Fidonia nelvae Rothschild, 1912; Narraga catalaunica Herbulot, 1943

= Narraga nelvae =

Species of moth

Narraga nelvae is a species of moth of the family Geometridae. It is found in Spain and North Africa.

== Subspecies ==
- Narraga nelvae cappadocica Herbulot, 1943
- Narraga nelvae catalaunica Herbulot, 1943 (Spain)
- Narraga nelvae nelvae (North Africa)
