= Scrobipalpula trichinaspis =

Scientific classification
- Kingdom: Animalia
- Phylum: Arthropoda
- Class: Insecta
- Order: Lepidoptera
- Family: Gelechiidae
- Genus: Scrobipalpula
- Species: S. trichinaspis

Binomial name
- Scrobipalpula trichinaspis (Meyrick, 1917)

Synonyms
- Phthorimaea trichinaspis Meyrick, 1917

Species of moth

Scrobipalpula trichinaspis is a moth in the family Gelechiidae. It was described by Edward Meyrick in 1917. It is found in Peru.

The wingspan is 9–10 mm. The forewings are whitish grey ochreous, irregularly sprinkled with dark fuscous. The stigmata are dark fuscous and obscure, with the plical slightly before the first discal. The hindwings are ochreous whitish.
