= Scrobipalpula polemoniella =

Scientific classification
- Domain: Eukaryota
- Kingdom: Animalia
- Phylum: Arthropoda
- Class: Insecta
- Order: Lepidoptera
- Family: Gelechiidae
- Genus: Scrobipalpula
- Species: S. polemoniella

Binomial name
- Scrobipalpula polemoniella (Braun, 1925)

Synonyms
- Phthorimaea polemoniella Braun, 1925

Species of moth

Scrobipalpula polemoniella is a moth in the family Gelechiidae. It was described by Annette Frances Braun in 1925. It is found in North America, where it has been recorded from Ohio.

The larvae feed on Polemonium reptans.
