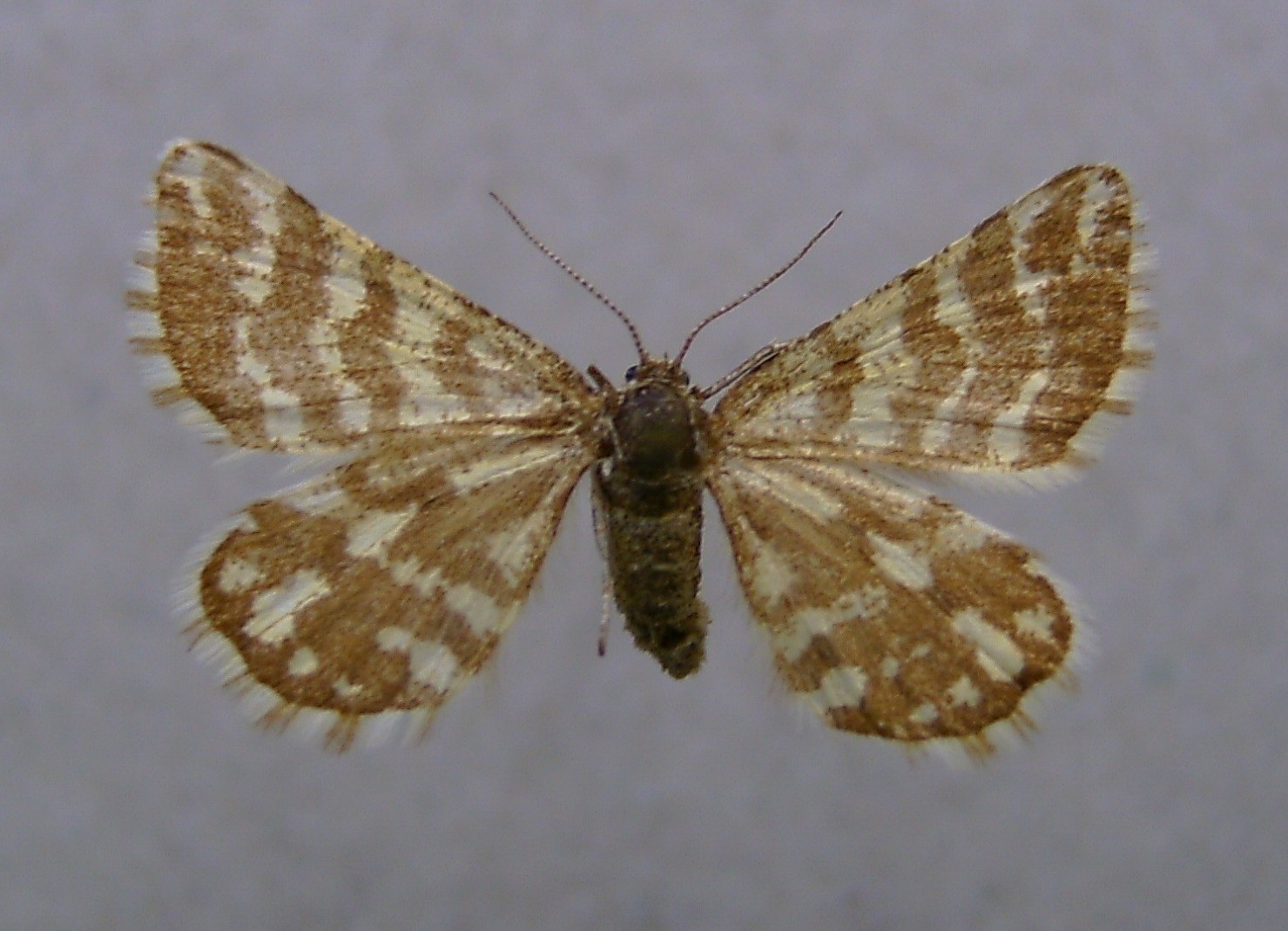
- Narraga fasciolari

Scientific classification
- Kingdom: Animalia
- Phylum: Arthropoda
- Class: Insecta
- Order: Lepidoptera
- Family: Geometridae
- Tribe: Macariini
- Genus: Narraga; Walker, 1861

Synonyms
- Fernaldella Hulst, 1896; Narragula Moucha & Povolny, 1957

= Narraga =

Genus of moths

Narraga is a genus of moths in the family Geometridae.

== Species ==
- Narraga fasciolaria (Hufnagel, 1767)
- Narraga fimetaria (Grote & Robinson, 1870)
- Narraga georgiana Covell, 1984
- Narraga isabel Agenjo, 1956
- Narraga nelvae (Rothschild, 1912)
- Narraga stalachtaria (Strecker, 1878)
- Narraga tessularia (Metzner, 1845)
