= Scrobipalpula densata =

Scientific classification
- Kingdom: Animalia
- Phylum: Arthropoda
- Class: Insecta
- Order: Lepidoptera
- Family: Gelechiidae
- Genus: Scrobipalpula
- Species: S. densata

Binomial name
- Scrobipalpula densata (Meyrick, 1917)

Synonyms
- Phthorimaea densata Meyrick, 1917; Phthorimaea laciniosa Meyrick, 1931

Species of moth

Scrobipalpula densata is a moth in the family Gelechiidae. It was described by Edward Meyrick in 1917. It is found in Argentina, Peru and on the Galápagos Islands.

The wingspan is 12–14 mm. The forewings are whitish sprinkled with dark grey or blackish and with several indistinct blackish dots on the basal area, an obscure rather oblique darker streak from the costa at one-fourth to the plical stigma, sometimes edged with whitish anteriorly, preceded and followed beneath the costa by ochreous marks. The stigmata are moderate or large, black and edged below by ochreous spots and sometimes surrounded by irregular ochreous markings, the plical rather obliquely before the first discal. There are indistinct cloudy whitish opposite costal and tornal marks at three-fourths, sometimes united into a slightly angulated shade. The hindwings are slaty grey.
