= Scrobipalpula =

Scientific classification
- Kingdom: Animalia
- Phylum: Arthropoda
- Clade: Pancrustacea
- Class: Insecta
- Order: Lepidoptera
- Family: Gelechiidae
- Subfamily: Gelechiinae
- Genus: Scrobipalpula; Povolný, 1964

Synonyms
- Scrobipalpulopsis Povolný, 1987

Genus of moths

Scrobipalpula is a genus of moths in the family Gelechiidae.

== Species ==
- Scrobipalpula acuta Povolný, 1990
- Scrobipalpula agnathos Povolný, 1987
- Scrobipalpula albolineata Povolný, 1987
- Scrobipalpula antiochia Powell & Povolný, 2001
- Scrobipalpula artemisiella (Kearfott, 1903)
- Scrobipalpula atra Povolný, 1987
- Scrobipalpula caustonae Landry, 2010
- Scrobipalpula crustaria (Meyrick, 1917)
- Scrobipalpula daturae (Zeller, 1877)
- Scrobipalpula densata (Meyrick, 1917)
- Scrobipalpula diffluella (Frey, 1870)
- Scrobipalpula ephoria (Meyrick, 1917)
- Scrobipalpula equatoriella Landry, 2010
- Scrobipalpula erigeronella (Braun, 1921)
- Scrobipalpula eurysaccomima Povolný, 1987
- Scrobipalpula fallacoides (Povolný, 1987)
- Scrobipalpula fallax (Povolný, 1987)
- Scrobipalpula falcata Povolný, 1987
- Scrobipalpula fjeldsai Povolný, 1990
- Scrobipalpula flava Povolný, 1987
- Scrobipalpula gregalis (Meyrick, 1917)
- Scrobipalpula gregariella (Zeller, 1877)
- Scrobipalpula gutierreziae Powell & Povolný, 2001
- Scrobipalpula hastata Povolný, 1987
- Scrobipalpula hemilitha (Clarke, 1965)
- Scrobipalpula henshawiella (Busck, 1903)
- Scrobipalpula hodgesi (Povolný, 1967)
- Scrobipalpula incerta Povolný, 1989
- Scrobipalpula inornata Landry, 2010
- Scrobipalpula isochlora (Meyrick, 1931)
- Scrobipalpula keiferioides Povolný, 1987
- Scrobipalpula latisaccula Povolný, 1987
- Scrobipalpula latiuncula Povolný, 1987
- Scrobipalpula lutescella (Clarke, 1934)
- Scrobipalpula lycii (Powell & Povolný, 2001)
- Scrobipalpula manierreorum Priest, 2014
- Scrobipalpula megaloloander Povolný, 1987
- Scrobipalpula melanolepis (Clarke, 1965)
- Scrobipalpula motasi Povolný, 1977
- Scrobipalpula ochroschista (Meyrick, 1929)
- Scrobipalpula omicron Povolný, 1987
- Scrobipalpula pallens Povolný, 1987
- Scrobipalpula parachiquitella Povolný, 1968
- Scrobipalpula patagonica Povolný, 1977
- Scrobipalpula physaliella (Chambers, 1872)
- Scrobipalpula polemoniella (Braun, 1925)
- Scrobipalpula potentella (Keifer, 1936)
- Scrobipalpula praeses (Povolny, 1987)
- Scrobipalpula psilella (Herrich-Schaffer, 1854)
- Scrobipalpula radiata Povolný, 1987
- Scrobipalpula radiatella (Busck, 1904)
- Scrobipalpula ramosella (Muller-Rutz, 1934)
- Scrobipalpula rosariensis Povolný, 1987
- Scrobipalpula sacculicola (Braun, 1925)
- Scrobipalpula semirosea (Meyrick, 1929)
- Scrobipalpula seniorum Povolný, 2000
- Scrobipalpula simulatrix (Povolný, 1987)
- Scrobipalpula stirodes (Meyrick, 1931)
- Scrobipalpula subtenera Povolný, 1987
- Scrobipalpula tenera Povolný, 1987
- Scrobipalpula transiens Povolný, 1987
- Scrobipalpula trichinaspis (Meyrick, 1917)
- Scrobipalpula tussilaginis (Stainton, 1867)

== Status unclear ==
- Scrobipalpula pygmaeella (Heinemann, 1870), described as Lita pygmaeella
