= Scrobipalpula semirosea =

Scientific classification
- Kingdom: Animalia
- Phylum: Arthropoda
- Class: Insecta
- Order: Lepidoptera
- Family: Gelechiidae
- Genus: Scrobipalpula
- Species: S. semirosea

Binomial name
- Scrobipalpula semirosea (Meyrick, 1929)

Synonyms
- Gnorimoschema semirosea Meyrick, 1929

Species of moth

Scrobipalpula semirosea is a moth in the family Gelechiidae. It is found solely in North America, where it has been observed in Texas.
