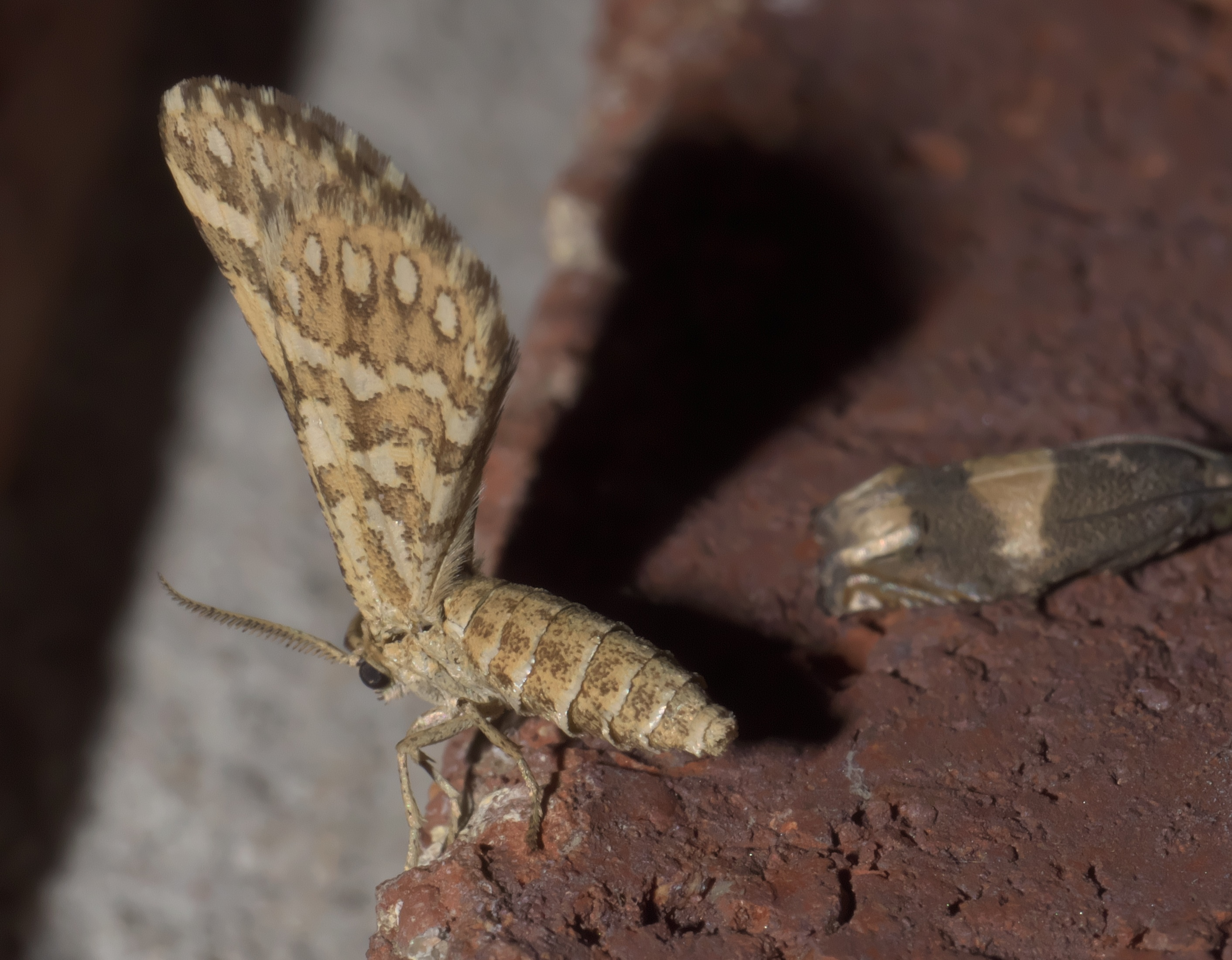

Scientific classification
- Kingdom: Animalia
- Phylum: Arthropoda
- Clade: Pancrustacea
- Class: Insecta
- Order: Lepidoptera
- Family: Geometridae
- Genus: Fernaldella
- Species: F. fimetaria

Binomial name
- Fernaldella fimetaria (Grote & Robinson, 1870)

Synonyms
- Fernaldella fimetaria angelata Grote and Robinson, 1870; Fidonia fimetaria Zeller, 1875; Fidonia halesaria Grote, 1883; Fidonia partitaria W. S. Wright, 1923; Narraga fimetaria

= Fernaldella fimetaria =

Species of moth

Fernaldella fimetaria, the green broomweed looper, is a species of geometrid moth in the family Geometridae. The species was first described by Grote and Robinson in 1870 It is found in Central and North America.
