= Scrobipalpula seniorum =

Scientific classification
- Kingdom: Animalia
- Phylum: Arthropoda
- Clade: Pancrustacea
- Class: Insecta
- Order: Lepidoptera
- Family: Gelechiidae
- Genus: Scrobipalpula
- Species: S. seniorum

Binomial name
- Scrobipalpula seniorum Povolný, 2000

Synonyms
- Scrobipalpula (psilella) seniorum Povolný, 2000; Gnorimoschema ptarmicae Hering, 1957; Scrobipalpula psilella f. compositella Povolný, 1964

Species of moth

Scrobipalpula seniorum is a moth in the family Gelechiidae. It was described by Povolný in 2000. It is found in North Macedonia and Greece.

The larvae feed on Achillea ageratifolia and Centaurea pindicola. They mine the leaves of their host plant.
