= Scrobipalpula lutescella =

Scientific classification
- Domain: Eukaryota
- Kingdom: Animalia
- Phylum: Arthropoda
- Class: Insecta
- Order: Lepidoptera
- Family: Gelechiidae
- Genus: Scrobipalpula
- Species: S. lutescella

Binomial name
- Scrobipalpula lutescella (Clarke, 1934)

Synonyms
- Gnorimoschema lutescella Clarke, 1934; Scrobipalpulopsis lutescella

Species of moth

Scrobipalpula lutescella is a moth in the family Gelechiidae. It was described by John Frederick Gates Clarke in 1934. It is found in North America, where it has been recorded from California, Washington, Alberta and Yukon.

The larvae feed on Castilleja lutescens.
