= Scrobipalpula gutierreziae =

Scientific classification
- Kingdom: Animalia
- Phylum: Arthropoda
- Clade: Pancrustacea
- Class: Insecta
- Order: Lepidoptera
- Family: Gelechiidae
- Genus: Scrobipalpula
- Species: S. gutierreziae

Binomial name
- Scrobipalpula gutierreziae Powell and Povolný, 2001

Species of moth

Scrobipalpula gutierreziae is a moth in the family Gelechiidae. It was described by Powell and Povolný in 2001. It is found in North America, where it has been recorded from California.
