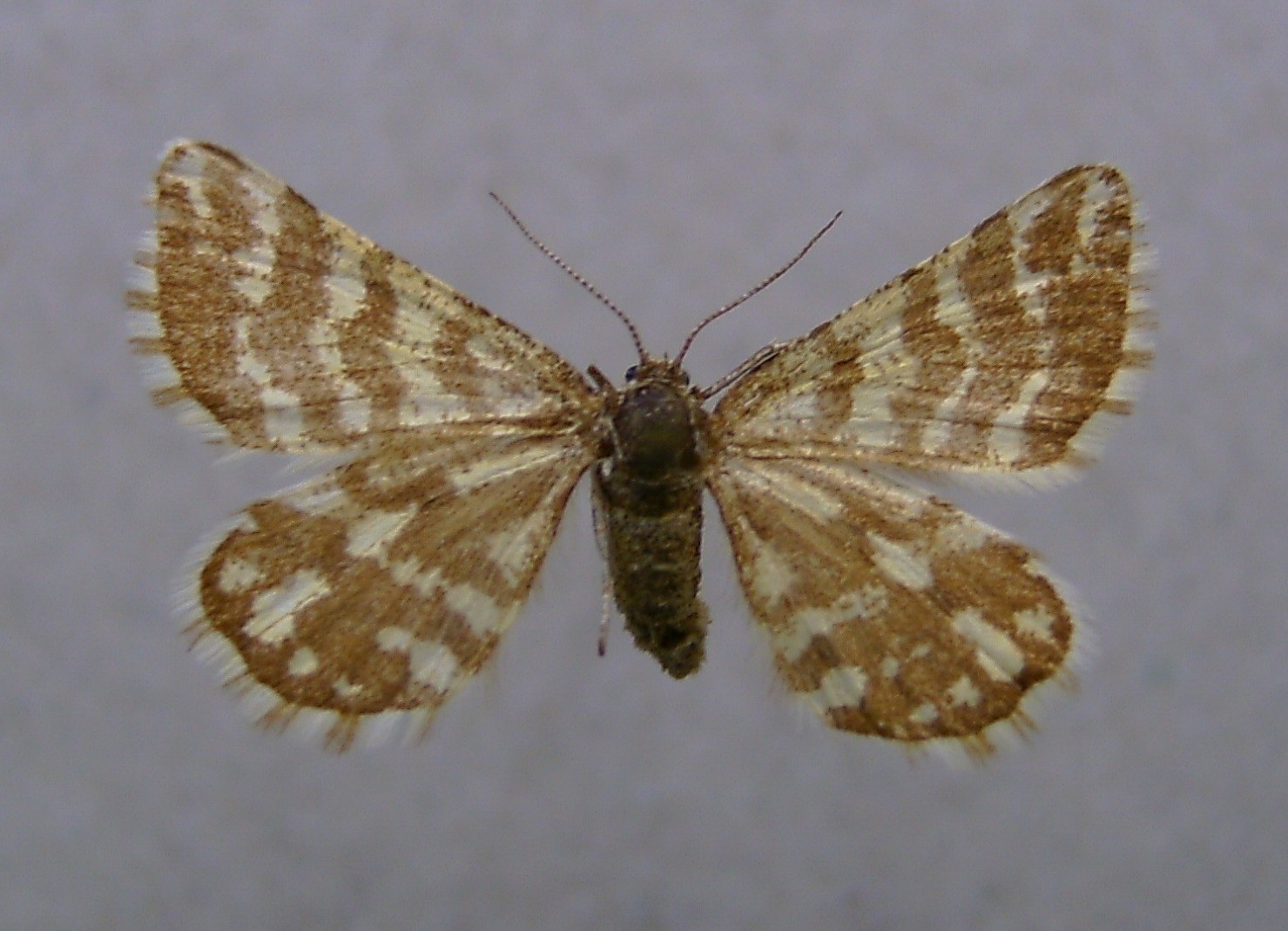
- Female
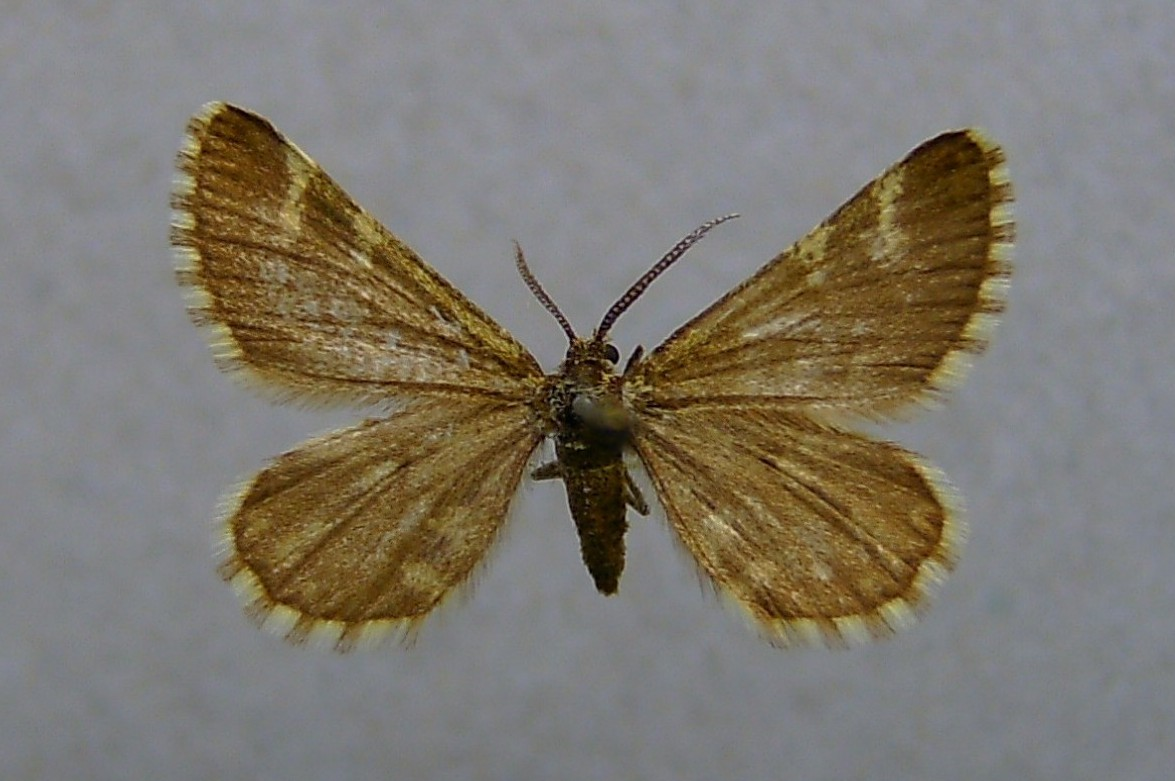
- Male

Scientific classification
- Domain: Eukaryota
- Kingdom: Animalia
- Phylum: Arthropoda
- Class: Insecta
- Order: Lepidoptera
- Family: Geometridae
- Genus: Narraga
- Species: N. fasciolaria

Binomial name
- Narraga fasciolaria (Hufnagel, 1767)

Synonyms
- Phalaena fasciolaria Hufnagel, 1767; Geometra cebraria Hübner, [1799]

= Narraga fasciolaria =

Species of moth

Narraga fasciolaria is a moth of the family Geometridae. It is found from the eastern part of central Europe, through central Asia and southern Russia to eastern Asia.

The wingspan is 16–21 mm. There are two generations per year. Adults of the first generation appear in May from overwintering pupa. The second generation appears in July.

The larvae feed on the leaves of Artemisia campestris. Pupation takes place in a cocoon in the soil.

== Subspecies ==
- Narraga fasciolaria fasciolaria
- Narraga fasciolaria turkmenica Povolny & Moucha, 1957
- Narraga fasciolaria fumipennis Prout, 1915
- Narraga fasciolaria danubialis Moucha & Povolny, 1957 (Hungary and Moravia)
