= Scrobipalpula manierreorum =

Scientific classification
- Domain: Eukaryota
- Kingdom: Animalia
- Phylum: Arthropoda
- Class: Insecta
- Order: Lepidoptera
- Family: Gelechiidae
- Genus: Scrobipalpula
- Species: S. manierreorum

Binomial name
- Scrobipalpula manierreorum Priest, 2014

Species of moth

Scrobipalpula manierreorum is a moth in the family Gelechiidae. It was described by Ronald J. Priest in 2014. It is found in North America, where it has been recorded from Alberta, British Columbia, Manitoba, Michigan, Ontario and Quebec.

The length of the forewings is 3.7−6.5 mm.

The larvae feed on Eurybia macrophylla. They mine the leaves of their host plant.
