= Scrobipalpula omicron =

Scientific classification
- Kingdom: Animalia
- Phylum: Arthropoda
- Clade: Pancrustacea
- Class: Insecta
- Order: Lepidoptera
- Family: Gelechiidae
- Genus: Scrobipalpula
- Species: S. omicron

Binomial name
- Scrobipalpula omicron Povolný, 1987

Species of moth

Scrobipalpula omicron is a moth in the family Gelechiidae. It was described by Povolný in 1987. It is found in Argentina.
