= Scrobipalpula physaliella =

Scientific classification
- Kingdom: Animalia
- Phylum: Arthropoda
- Clade: Pancrustacea
- Class: Insecta
- Order: Lepidoptera
- Family: Gelechiidae
- Genus: Scrobipalpula
- Species: S. physaliella

Binomial name
- Scrobipalpula physaliella (Chambers, 1872)

Synonyms
- Gelechia physaliella Chambers, 1872; Aristotelia physaliella

Species of moth

Scrobipalpula physaliella is a moth in the family Gelechiidae. It was described by Vactor Tousey Chambers in 1872. It is found in North America, where it has been recorded from Kentucky, New Hampshire and Arizona.

The forewings are dark brown, a little bronzed, rather indistinctly dusted with ocherous, and still more indistinctly with white.

The larvae feed on Physalis viscosa. They mine the leaves of their host plant. They mine the under the surface, and produce a tubicular swelling of the upper surface. Pupation takes place amongst leaves on the ground.
