= Scrobipalpula parachiquitella =

Scientific classification
- Kingdom: Animalia
- Phylum: Arthropoda
- Clade: Pancrustacea
- Class: Insecta
- Order: Lepidoptera
- Family: Gelechiidae
- Genus: Scrobipalpula
- Species: S. parachiquitella

Binomial name
- Scrobipalpula parachiquitella Povolný, 1968

Synonyms
- Tuta parachiquitella

Species of moth

Scrobipalpula parachiquitella is a moth in the family Gelechiidae. It was described by Povolný in 1968. It is found on Cuba.
