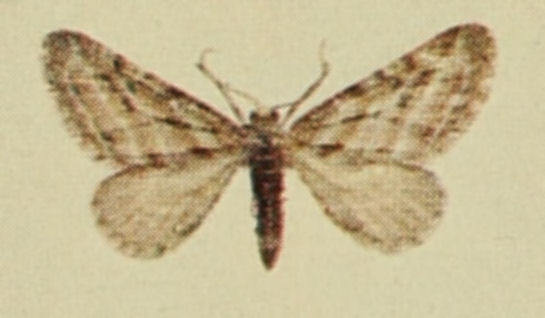

Scientific classification
- Domain: Eukaryota
- Kingdom: Animalia
- Phylum: Arthropoda
- Class: Insecta
- Order: Lepidoptera
- Family: Geometridae
- Genus: Eupithecia
- Species: E. extensaria

Binomial name
- Eupithecia extensaria (Freyer, 1844)

Synonyms
- Acidalia extensaria Freyer, 1844; Eupithecia sydyi Staudinger, 1885; Larentia prolongata Lienig, 1846; Eupithecia prolongata Dietze, 1910

= Eupithecia extensaria =

Species of moth

Eupithecia extensaria, the scarce pug, is a moth of the family Geometridae. The species was first described by Christian Friedrich Freyer in 1844. It is found in the British Isles (rare, and confined to eastern saltmarshes), Spain and eastern Europe.

The wingspan is 21–25 mm. The moth flies in both May and June.

The larvae feed on sea wormwood (Artemisia maritima).

== Subspecies ==
- Eupithecia extensaria extensaria
- Eupithecia extensaria leuca Dietze, 1910
- Eupithecia extensaria occidua Prout, 1914
