= Scrobipalpula henshawiella =

Scientific classification
- Domain: Eukaryota
- Kingdom: Animalia
- Phylum: Arthropoda
- Class: Insecta
- Order: Lepidoptera
- Family: Gelechiidae
- Genus: Scrobipalpula
- Species: S. henshawiella

Binomial name
- Scrobipalpula henshawiella (Busck, 1903)

Synonyms
- Gnorimoschema henshawiella Busck, 1903; Gelechia ochreostrigella Chambers, 1877 (preocc. Chambers, 1875)

Species of moth

Scrobipalpula henshawiella is a moth in the family Gelechiidae. It was described by August Busck in 1903. It is found in North America, where it has been recorded from Colorado and Mississippi.

The forewings are hoary, almost white, but so densely dusted with brownish as to obscure the ground color, and streaked with ochreous. The two most distinct ochreous streaks are one along the fold and one from the base within the costal margin, and one along the end of the cell, which contains two small dark spots, one of which is at the end of the cell. Both of these spots, however, are sometimes not present. The hindwings are pale grayish.
