= Scrobipalpula inornata =

Scientific classification
- Domain: Eukaryota
- Kingdom: Animalia
- Phylum: Arthropoda
- Class: Insecta
- Order: Lepidoptera
- Family: Gelechiidae
- Genus: Scrobipalpula
- Species: S. inornata

Binomial name
- Scrobipalpula inornata Landry, 2010

Species of moth

Scrobipalpula inornata is a moth in the family Gelechiidae. It was described by Bernard Landry in 2010. It is found on the Galápagos Islands.
