= Scrobipalpula ephoria =

Scientific classification
- Kingdom: Animalia
- Phylum: Arthropoda
- Class: Insecta
- Order: Lepidoptera
- Family: Gelechiidae
- Genus: Scrobipalpula
- Species: S. ephoria

Binomial name
- Scrobipalpula ephoria (Meyrick, 1917)

Synonyms
- Aristotelia crustaria Meyrick, 1917

Species of moth

Scrobipalpula ephoria is a moth in the family Gelechiidae. It was described by Edward Meyrick in 1917. It is found in Peru.

The wingspan is about 9 mm. The forewings are grey sprinkled with whitish and dark fuscous and with a very oblique blackish mark on the fold near the base. There is an oblique dark fuscous bar from the costa at one-third, terminated by a blackish mark on the fold edged beneath with ochreous. The discal stigmata are blackish, edged beneath with ochreous, the first beyond the plical. There are some blackish scales above the tornus and at the apex. The hindwings are light bluish grey.
