= Scrobipalpula stirodes =

Scientific classification
- Kingdom: Animalia
- Phylum: Arthropoda
- Class: Insecta
- Order: Lepidoptera
- Family: Gelechiidae
- Genus: Scrobipalpula
- Species: S. stirodes

Binomial name
- Scrobipalpula stirodes (Meyrick, 1931)

Synonyms
- Phthorimaea stirodes Meyrick, 1931

Species of moth

Scrobipalpula stirodes is a moth in the family Gelechiidae. It was described by Edward Meyrick in 1931. It is found in Argentina.
