= Scrobipalpula ramosella =

Scientific classification
- Domain: Eukaryota
- Kingdom: Animalia
- Phylum: Arthropoda
- Class: Insecta
- Order: Lepidoptera
- Family: Gelechiidae
- Genus: Scrobipalpula
- Species: S. ramosella

Binomial name
- Scrobipalpula ramosella (Müller-Rutz, 1934)

Synonyms
- Lita ramosella Müller-Rutz, 1934

Species of moth

Scrobipalpula ramosella is a moth in the family Gelechiidae. It was described by Johann Müller-Rutz in 1934. It is found in the Alps of France and Switzerland.

The larvae feed on Erigeron species, Centaurea pindicola, Achillea holosericea and Artemisia umbelliformis. They mine the leaves of their host plant, from between spun leaves. They are gregarious.
