= Scrobipalpula motasi =

Scientific classification
- Kingdom: Animalia
- Phylum: Arthropoda
- Clade: Pancrustacea
- Class: Insecta
- Order: Lepidoptera
- Family: Gelechiidae
- Genus: Scrobipalpula
- Species: S. motasi

Binomial name
- Scrobipalpula motasi Povolný, 1977

Species of moth

Scrobipalpula motasi is a moth in the family Gelechiidae. It was described by Povolný in 1977. It is found in Colombia.
