= Scrobipalpula potentella =

Scientific classification
- Domain: Eukaryota
- Kingdom: Animalia
- Phylum: Arthropoda
- Class: Insecta
- Order: Lepidoptera
- Family: Gelechiidae
- Genus: Scrobipalpula
- Species: S. potentella

Binomial name
- Scrobipalpula potentella (Keifer, 1936)

Synonyms
- Gnorimoschema potentella Keifer, 1936

Species of moth

Scrobipalpula potentella is a moth in the family Gelechiidae. It was described by Keifer in 1936. It is found in the United States, where it has been recorded from California, Mississippi and Tennessee.

The larvae feed on Potentilla species. They mine the leaves of their host plant.
