= Scrobipalpula hemilitha =

Scientific classification
- Domain: Eukaryota
- Kingdom: Animalia
- Phylum: Arthropoda
- Class: Insecta
- Order: Lepidoptera
- Family: Gelechiidae
- Genus: Scrobipalpula
- Species: S. hemilitha

Binomial name
- Scrobipalpula hemilitha (Clarke, 1965)

Synonyms
- Gnorimoschema hemilitha Clarke, 1965

Species of moth

Scrobipalpula hemilitha is a moth in the family Gelechiidae. It was described by Clarke in 1965. It is found on the Galapagos Islands.

The wingspan is 9–11 mm. The forewings are clay color, the costal half suffused greyish, irrorate with many white-tipped, dark grey scales. There are two clouded areas in the center of the wing. There are three dark grey discal stigmata, one at one-third in the cell, one in the fold slightly beyond the first and one at the end of the cell. The hindwings are light greyish fuscous.
