= Scrobipalpula hastata =

Scientific classification
- Kingdom: Animalia
- Phylum: Arthropoda
- Clade: Pancrustacea
- Class: Insecta
- Order: Lepidoptera
- Family: Gelechiidae
- Genus: Scrobipalpula
- Species: S. hastata

Binomial name
- Scrobipalpula hastata Povolný, 1987

Species of moth

Scrobipalpula hastata is a moth in the family Gelechiidae. It was described by Povolný in 1987. It is found in Argentina.
