= Scrobipalpula ochroschista =

Scientific classification
- Kingdom: Animalia
- Phylum: Arthropoda
- Class: Insecta
- Order: Lepidoptera
- Family: Gelechiidae
- Genus: Scrobipalpula
- Species: S. ochroschista

Binomial name
- Scrobipalpula ochroschista (Meyrick, 1929)

Synonyms
- Phthorimaea ochroschista Meyrick, 1929

Species of moth

Scrobipalpula ochroschista is a moth in the family Gelechiidae. It was described by Edward Meyrick in 1926. It is found in North America, where it has been recorded from Texas.
