= Scrobipalpula sacculicola =

Scientific classification
- Domain: Eukaryota
- Kingdom: Animalia
- Phylum: Arthropoda
- Class: Insecta
- Order: Lepidoptera
- Family: Gelechiidae
- Genus: Scrobipalpula
- Species: S. sacculicola

Binomial name
- Scrobipalpula sacculicola (Braun, 1925)

Synonyms
- Phthorimaea sacculicola Braun, 1925

Species of moth

Scrobipalpula sacculicola is a moth in the family Gelechiidae. It was described by Annette Frances Braun in 1925. It is found in North America, where it has been recorded from Colorado, Ohio and Oklahoma.
