= Scrobipalpula equatoriella =

Scientific classification
- Kingdom: Animalia
- Phylum: Arthropoda
- Clade: Pancrustacea
- Class: Insecta
- Order: Lepidoptera
- Family: Gelechiidae
- Genus: Scrobipalpula
- Species: S. equatoriella

Binomial name
- Scrobipalpula equatoriella Landry, 2010

Species of moth

Scrobipalpula equatoriella is a moth in the family Gelechiidae. It was described by Bernard Landry in 2010. It is found on the Galápagos Islands.
