= Scrobipalpula erigeronella =

Scientific classification
- Domain: Eukaryota
- Kingdom: Animalia
- Phylum: Arthropoda
- Class: Insecta
- Order: Lepidoptera
- Family: Gelechiidae
- Genus: Scrobipalpula
- Species: S. erigeronella

Binomial name
- Scrobipalpula erigeronella (Braun, 1921)

Synonyms
- Gnorimoschema erigeronella Braun, 1921

Species of moth

Scrobipalpula erigeronella is a moth in the family Gelechiidae. It was described by Annette Frances Braun in 1921. It is found in North America, where it has been recorded from Montana.

The wingspan is 11.5–14 mm. The forewings are ocherous, marked with lines of white black-barred scales, which follow the veins and the margins of the wing, leaving the fold ocherous. The lower margin of the cell is broadly thus clothed, and the dorsal part of the wing below the fold has only a short longitudinal streak of ocherous which is sometimes entirely wanting. Around the apex the scales on the interspaces are more broadly barred with black than those along the veins. There is an elongate black spot or dash at the middle of the cell just below and in contact with the line of scales along the upper margin. A similar spot is found at the end of the cell. These are the two most distinct spots, but there is usually an aggregation of blackish scales on the fold just below the first discal spot. A similar spot is found on the ocherous ground color just within the costal margin near the base. The hindwings are silvery gray in females, but darker in males.
