= Scrobipalpula gregalis =

Scientific classification
- Domain: Eukaryota
- Kingdom: Animalia
- Phylum: Arthropoda
- Class: Insecta
- Order: Lepidoptera
- Family: Gelechiidae
- Genus: Scrobipalpula
- Species: S. gregalis

Binomial name
- Scrobipalpula gregalis (Meyrick, 1917)

Synonyms
- Phthorimaea gregalis Meyrick, 1917

Species of moth

Scrobipalpula gregalis is a moth in the family Gelechiidae. It was described by Edward Meyrick in 1917. It is found in Peru.

The wingspan is 12–13 mm. The forewings are dark fuscous, speckled with whitish and sometimes with short brownish-ochreous dashes beneath the costa at one-sixth and one-third. The stigmata are small, black and sometimes edged with brownish markings, the plical rather obliquely before the first discal. Sometimes, there is some obscure brownish marking in the disc posteriorly. The hindwings are slaty grey.
