= Scrobipalpula lycii =

Scientific classification
- Kingdom: Animalia
- Phylum: Arthropoda
- Clade: Pancrustacea
- Class: Insecta
- Order: Lepidoptera
- Family: Gelechiidae
- Genus: Scrobipalpula
- Species: S. lycii

Binomial name
- Scrobipalpula lycii (Powell & Povolný, 2001)

Synonyms
- Scrobipalpulopsis lycii Powell & Povolný, 2001

Species of moth

Scrobipalpula lycii is a moth in the family Gelechiidae. It was described by Powell and Povolný in 2001. It is found in North America, where it has been recorded from California.

The larvae possibly feed on Lycium californicum.
