= Scrobipalpula isochlora =

Scientific classification
- Kingdom: Animalia
- Phylum: Arthropoda
- Class: Insecta
- Order: Lepidoptera
- Family: Gelechiidae
- Genus: Scrobipalpula
- Species: S. isochlora

Binomial name
- Scrobipalpula isochlora (Meyrick, 1931)

Synonyms
- Phthorimaea isochlora Meyrick, 1931

Species of moth

Scrobipalpula isochlora is a moth in the family Gelechiidae. It was described by Edward Meyrick in 1931. It is found in Brazil.
