= Fernaldella stalachtaria =

Scientific classification
- Kingdom: Animalia
- Phylum: Arthropoda
- Clade: Pancrustacea
- Class: Insecta
- Order: Lepidoptera
- Family: Geometridae
- Genus: Fernaldella
- Species: F. stalachtaria

Binomial name
- Fernaldella stalachtaria (Strecker in Ruffner, 1878)

Synonyms
- Fidonia alternaria Strecker in Ruffner, 1878; Fidonia stalachtaria Grote, 1883; Narraga stalachtaria

Species of moth

Fernaldella stalachtaria is a species of geometrid moth in the family Geometridae. It is found in North America.
