= Scrobipalpula melanolepis =

Scientific classification
- Kingdom: Animalia
- Phylum: Arthropoda
- Clade: Pancrustacea
- Class: Insecta
- Order: Lepidoptera
- Family: Gelechiidae
- Genus: Scrobipalpula
- Species: S. melanolepis

Binomial name
- Scrobipalpula melanolepis (Clarke, 1965)

Synonyms
- Gnorimoschema melanolepis Clarke, 1965

Species of moth

Scrobipalpula melanolepis is a moth in the family Gelechiidae. It was described by Clarke in 1965. It is found on the Galapagos Islands.

The wingspan is 11–13 mm. The forewings are cinereous, irrorated and suffused with greyish fuscous. At the base of the wing, in the fold, is a small fuscous spot and slightly beyond a similar mark. At the basal third, in the cell, is a conspicuous fuscous blotch extending obliquely and outwardly to slightly beyond the fold and there is a similarly colored, subquadrate blotch extending from the middle of the wing, in the cell, to the fold. The area between the two large dark blotches, and beyond the outer one, is conspicuously paler, less irrorated with fuscous than the rest of the wing and with scattered ochreous scales. The hindwings are pearly grey in males and grey in females.
