= Scrobipalpula caustonae =

Scientific classification
- Kingdom: Animalia
- Phylum: Arthropoda
- Clade: Pancrustacea
- Class: Insecta
- Order: Lepidoptera
- Family: Gelechiidae
- Genus: Scrobipalpula
- Species: S. caustonae

Binomial name
- Scrobipalpula caustonae Landry, 2010

Species of moth

Scrobipalpula caustonae is a moth in the family Gelechiidae. It was described by Bernard Landry in 2010. It is found on the Galápagos Islands.

== Etymology ==
The species is named for Charlotte Causton, former head of Charles Darwin Research Station's Department of Invertebrates.
