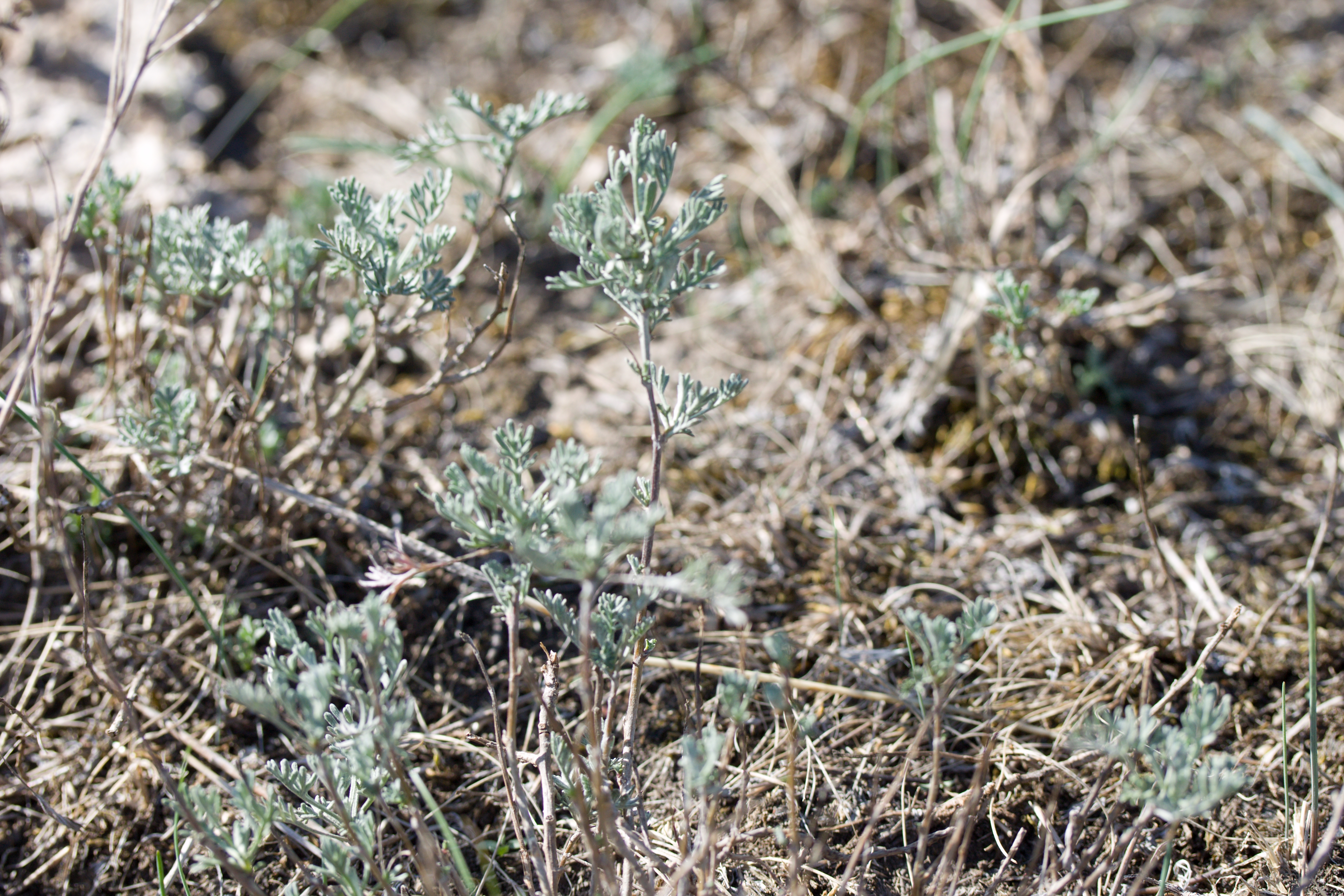
- Artemisia santonicum in Serbia

Scientific classification
- Kingdom: Plantae
- Clade: Tracheophytes
- Clade: Angiosperms
- Clade: Eudicots
- Clade: Asterids
- Order: Asterales
- Family: Asteraceae
- Genus: Artemisia
- Species: A. santonicum

Binomial name
- Artemisia santonicum L. 1753

Synonyms
- Artemisia mutabilis Salisb., nom. superfl.; Seriphidium santonicum (L.) Soják

= Artemisia santonicum =

Species of flowering plant

Artemisia santonicum (saline wormwood) is a species of wormwood native to eastern Europe and western Asia, from Austria east through the Balkans, Ukraine and southern Russia to Kazakhstan, and also through Turkey to Iran.

There are two subspecies, which overlap in parts of southeast Europe:

- Artemisia santonicum subsp. santonicum – in the eastern and central parts of the range
- Artemisia santonicum subsp. patens (Neilr.) K.Perss. – in the western part of the range

== Description and similar species ==
Saline wormwood is a herbaceous perennial plant or subshrub growing to 20–60 cm tall. It has strongly aromatic foliage, usually greyish-green to whitish-green, but can become glabrous green with wear. The leaves are deeply twice to thrice pinnatifid, with narrow, linear segments 0.7–1 mm broad, and are covered on both sides with a dense coat of white hairs. The small, oblong flower heads are 1–2 mm diameter, are of a yellowish or brownish tint; they are produced in September to October, and are arranged in racemes, sometimes drooping, sometimes erect.

It has often been erroneously reported as the closely related north European Artemisia maritima.

== Habitat ==
It occurs on saline soils, being found on the drier parts of saltmarshes, brackish ditches, saltpans, sea cliffs, and coastal shingle.

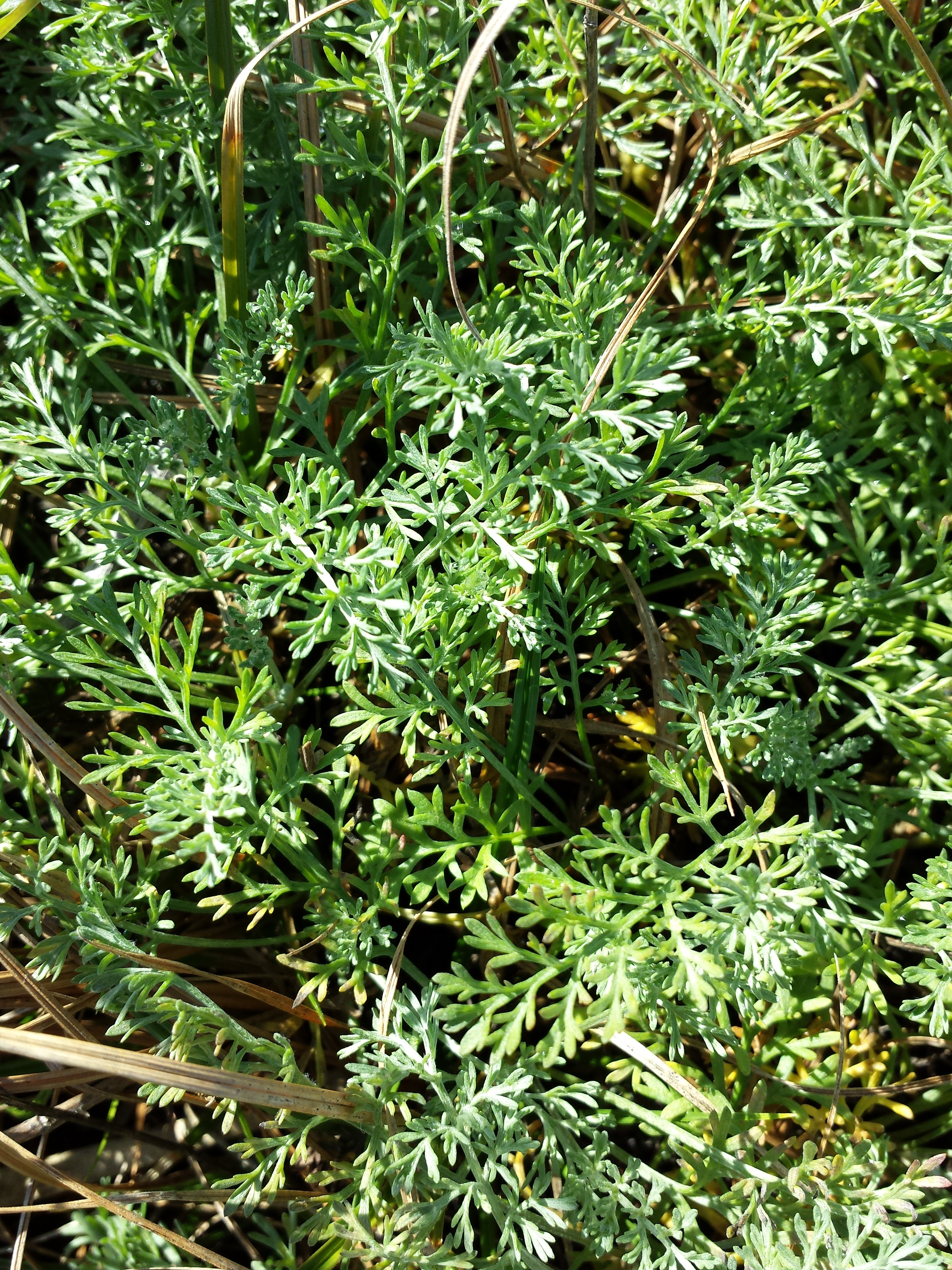
Foliage. Dried-out small salt lake near Neusiedl am See, Burgenland, Austria.

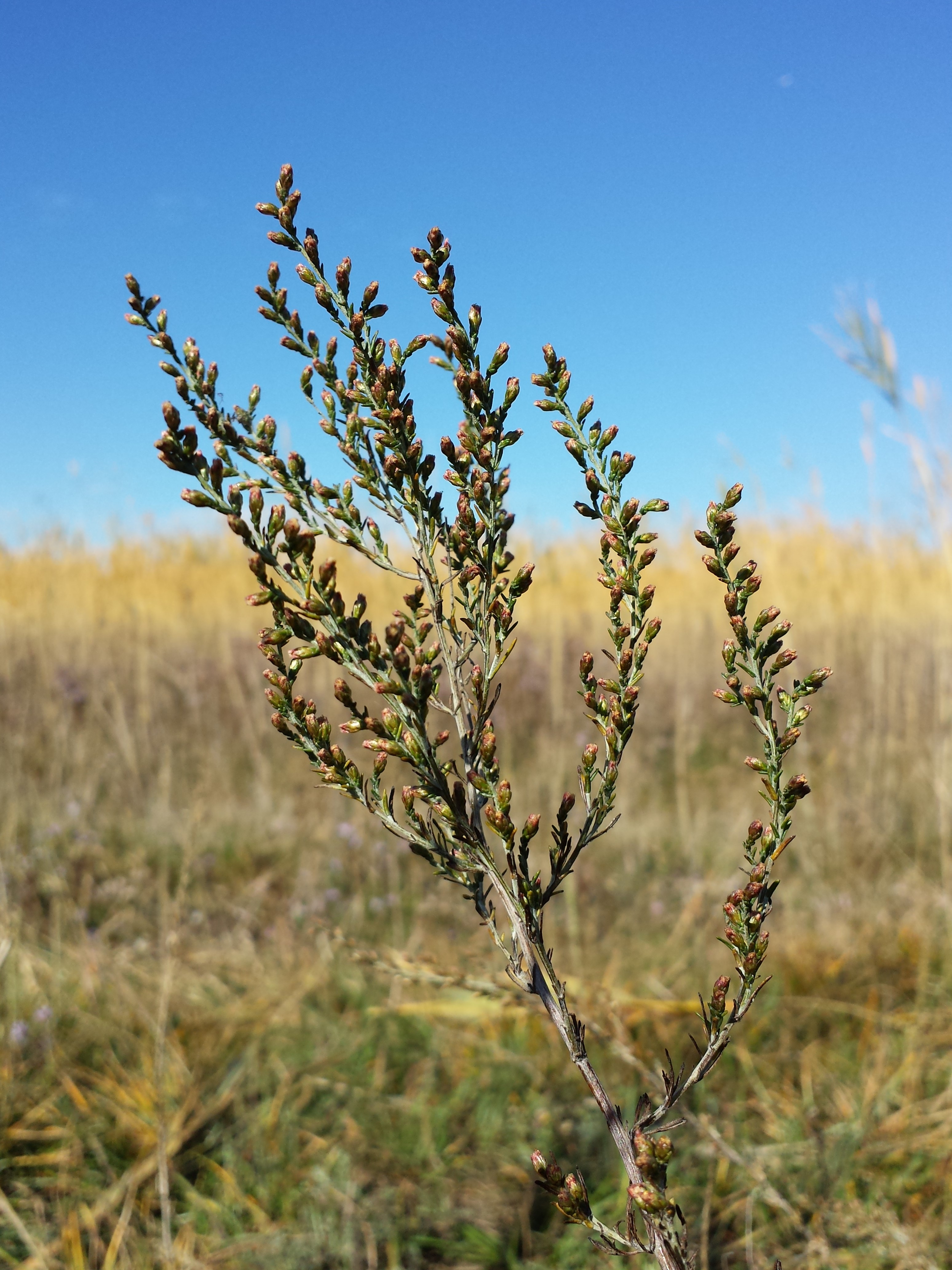
Flowers; erect form. Same site as left.

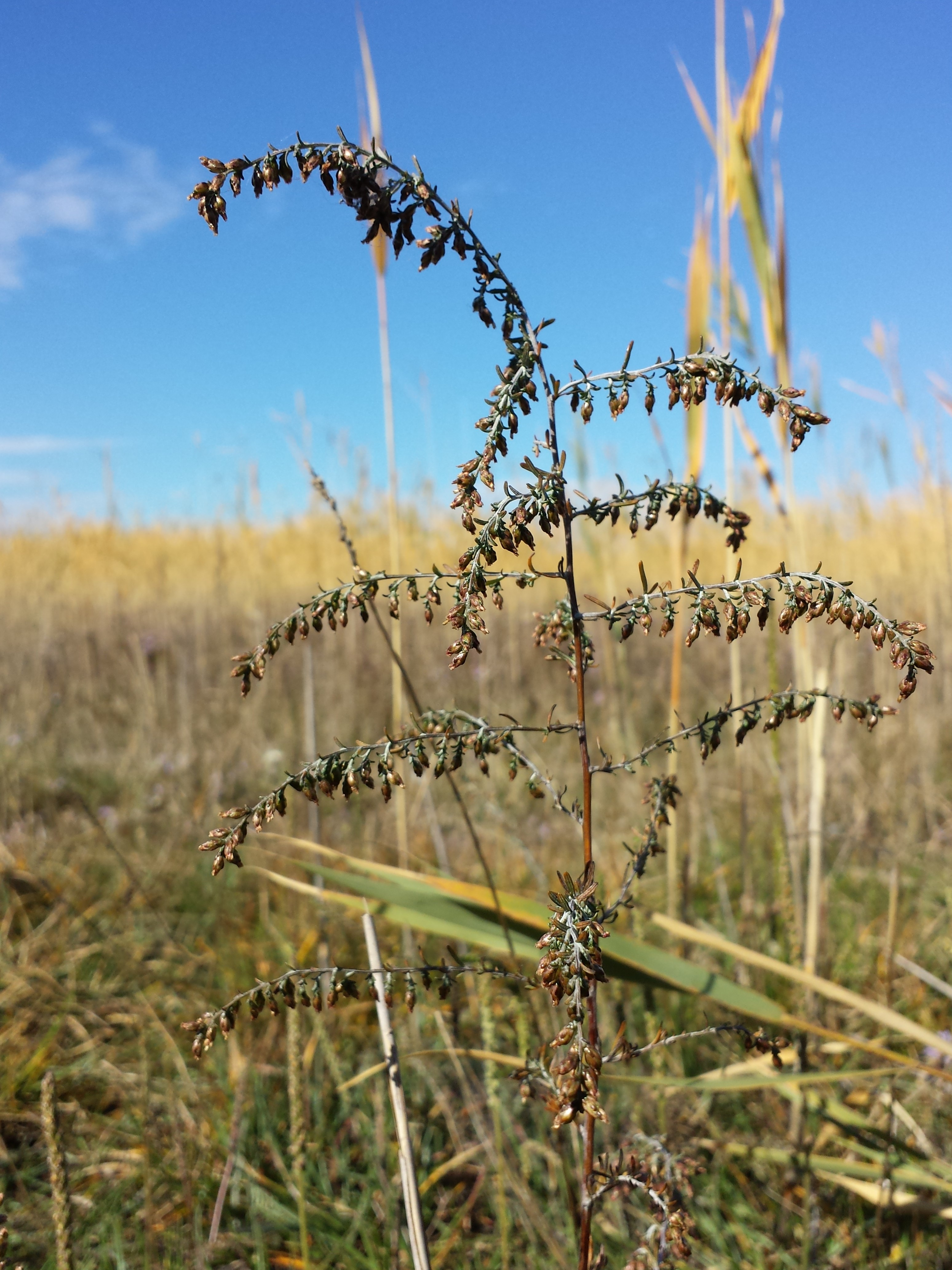
Flowers; drooping form. Same site as left.
