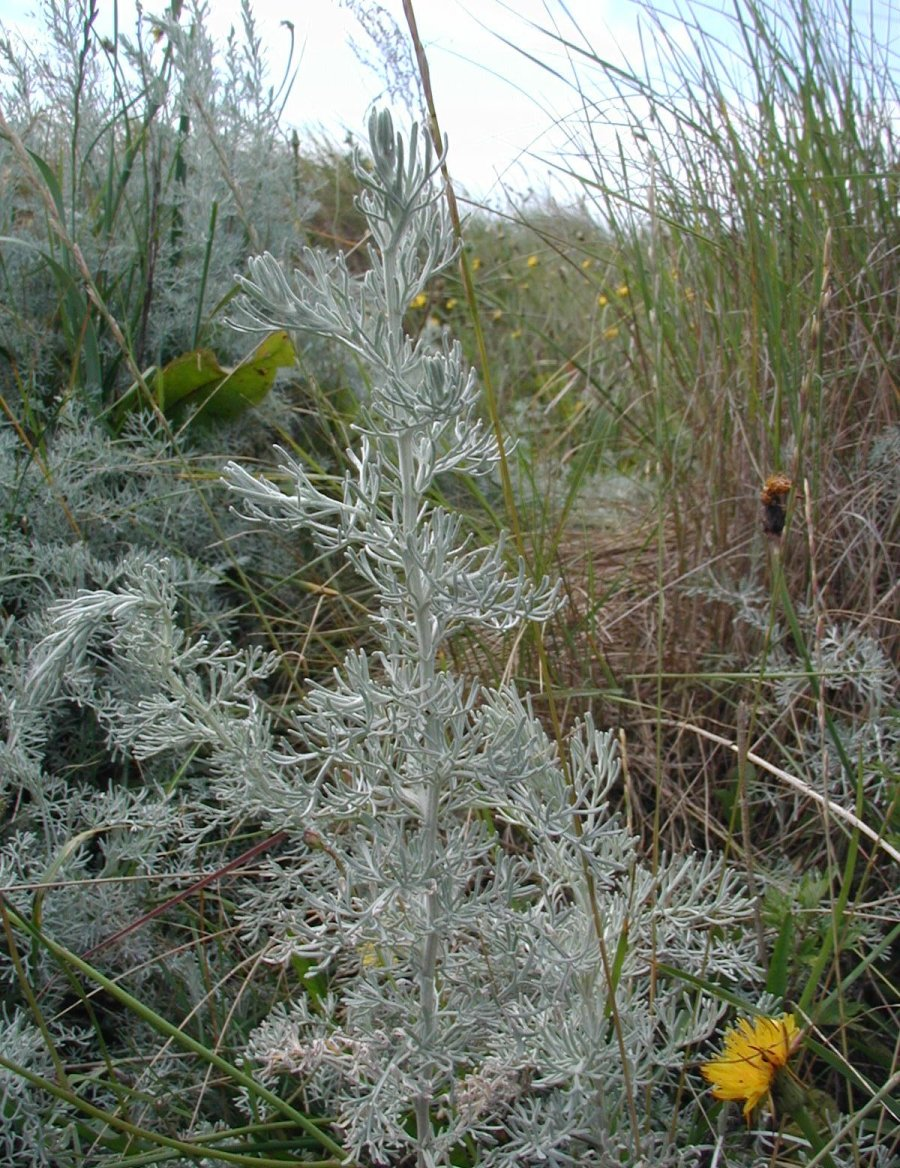

Scientific classification
- Kingdom: Plantae
- Clade: Tracheophytes
- Clade: Angiosperms
- Clade: Eudicots
- Clade: Asterids
- Order: Asterales
- Family: Asteraceae
- Genus: Artemisia
- Species: A. maritima

Binomial name
- Artemisia maritima L. 1753

Synonyms
- Artemisia seriphium Wallr., nom. superfl.; Artemisia seriphium var. latifolia Wallr.; Seriphidium maritimum (L.) Poljakov

= Artemisia maritima =

Species of flowering plant

Artemisia maritima is a European species of wormwood known as sea wormwood, and also formerly often by its synonym Seriphidium maritimum. It is native to the Atlantic coasts of northern Europe, from western and northern France, Ireland, the United Kingdom, Belgium, the Netherlands, Germany, Denmark, Sweden, Norway, the Baltic States, and northwestern Russia. In Great Britain, it is found as far north as Wigton on the west coast and Cruden Bay on the east coast, and in Ireland, on the east and west coasts between Dublin and Killough, and Tralee Bay to Galway; it also occurs on the Isle of Man.

There are two subspecies:

- Artemisia maritima subsp. maritima – in the western part of the range
- Artemisia maritima subsp. humifusa (Fr. ex C.Hartm.) K.Perss. – in the northeastern part of the range

== Description and similar species ==
Sea wormwood is a herbaceous perennial plant or subshrub growing to 50 cm, which flowers from August to September; it has strongly aromatic pale grey-green to whitish-green foliage, and is wind pollinated. The leaves are deeply twice pinnatifid, with narrow, linear segments, and, like the whole plant, are covered on both sides with a dense coat of white cottony hairs. The small, oblong flower heads, each containing three to six tubular florets 1–2 mm diameter, are of a yellowish or brownish tint; they are produced in August and September, and are arranged in racemes, sometimes drooping, sometimes erect.

It is the caterpillar foodplant of Eupithecia extensaria.

It somewhat resembles wormwood Artemisia absinthium and hoary mugwort A. stelleriana, but has slenderer leaf segments under 2 mm broad; A. stelleriana also lacks the strong scent.

Reports of the species from southeastern Europe are based on misapplication of the name to the closely related Artemisia santonicum.

== Habitat ==
It occurs mostly on saline soils, being found on the drier parts of saltmarshes, brackish ditches, sea cliffs, and coastal shingle. As with many other saltmarsh plants, it has started to colonise inland along roadsides that are salted to melt winter ice and snow.

== Usage ==
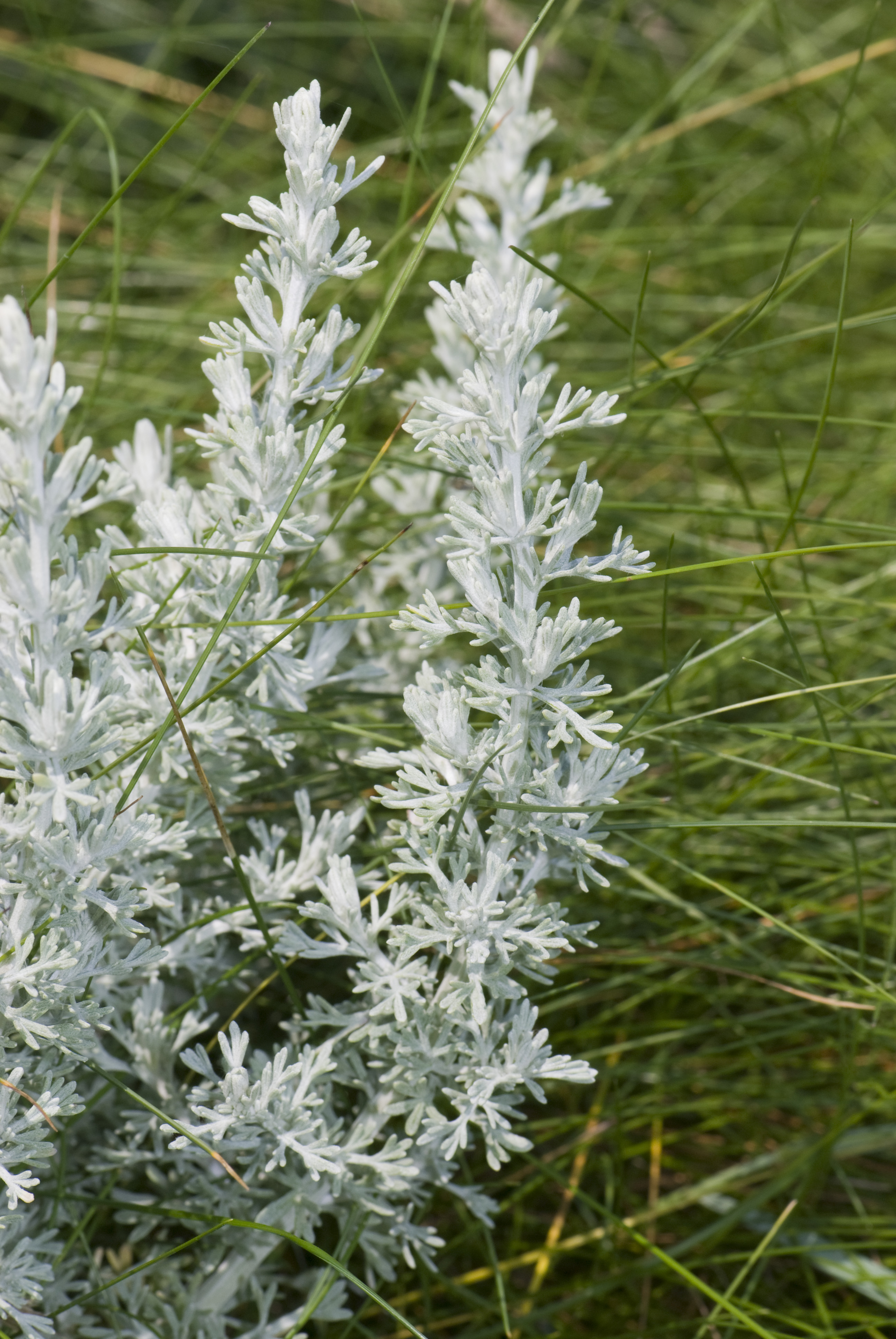
Close up of Artemisia maritima foliage

John Hill said in 1771 of this species: "This is a very noble bitter: its peculiar province is to give an appetite, as that of the Common Wormwood is to assist digestion; the flowery tops and the young shoots possess the virtue: the older Leaves and the Stalk should be thrown away as useless .... The apothecaries put three times as much sugar as of the ingredient in their Conserves; but the virtue is lost in the sweetness, those will not keep so well that have less sugar, but 'tis easy to make them fresh as they are wanted." Thornton, in his Family Herbal, tells us that "beat up with thrice its weight of fine sugar, it is made up into a conserve ordered by the London College, and may be taken where the other preparations disgust too much."

The plant is a source of the sesquiterpenoid santonin.
