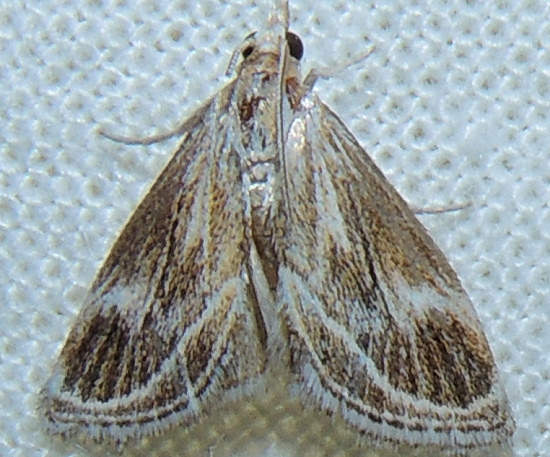

Scientific classification
- Domain: Eukaryota
- Kingdom: Animalia
- Phylum: Arthropoda
- Class: Insecta
- Order: Lepidoptera
- Family: Crambidae
- Genus: Frechinia
- Species: F. helianthiales

Binomial name
- Frechinia helianthiales (Murtfeldt, 1897)

Synonyms
- Titanio helianthiales Murtfeldt, 1897; Pionea thyanalis Druce, 1889; Titanio murmuralis Dyar, 1917

= Frechinia helianthiales =

Species of moth

Frechinia helianthiales is a moth in the family Crambidae. It was described by Mary Murtfeldt in 1897. It is found in North America, where it has been recorded from Arizona, Illinois, Manitoba, Missouri and Oklahoma, south to Mexico.

The length of the forewings is 6.5-8.5 mm. Adults have been recorded on wing from May to August.

The larvae feed on Helianthus species. They mine the leaves of their host plant.
