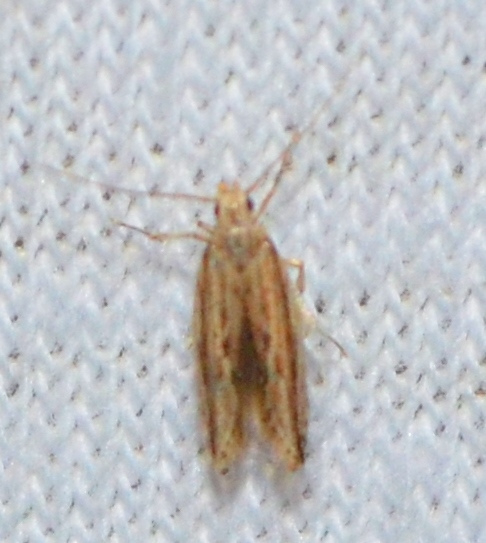

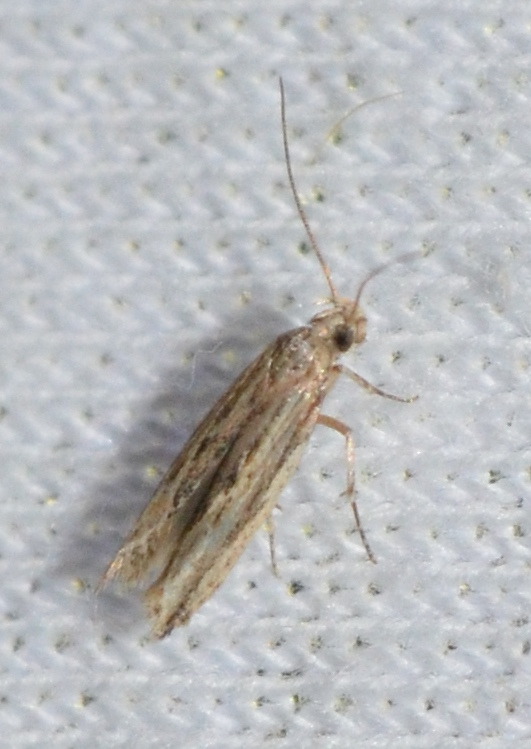

Scientific classification
- Domain: Eukaryota
- Kingdom: Animalia
- Phylum: Arthropoda
- Class: Insecta
- Order: Lepidoptera
- Family: Gelechiidae
- Genus: Symmetrischema
- Species: S. striatella

Binomial name
- Symmetrischema striatella (Murtfeldt, 1900)

Synonyms
- Eucatoptus striatella Murtfeldt, 1900

= Symmetrischema striatella =

Species of moth

Symmetrischema striatella is a moth in the family Gelechiidae. It was described by Mary Murtfeldt in 1900. It is found in North America, where it has been recorded Alabama, Arkansas, California, Florida, Illinois, Louisiana, Maine, Maryland, Mississippi, Missouri, New Jersey, Oklahoma, South Carolina, Tennessee and Texas. This species has also been accidentally introduced to New Zealand.

The wingspan is 11–13 mm. The forewings are light brown or brownish ocherous, sparsely speckled with black. There is a subcostal black, longitudinal line extending from the base to the apex, curving upward slightly and intensifying at the latter. Beneath this, two more or less definite blackish striations, the one on the inner margin being quite broad and diffused, while the discal streak is variable, not continuous, often consisting of two or three dashes. The hindwings are silken, ashy white, shading to cinereous (ash gray) at the tips.

The larvae feed on the berries of Solanum nigrum.
