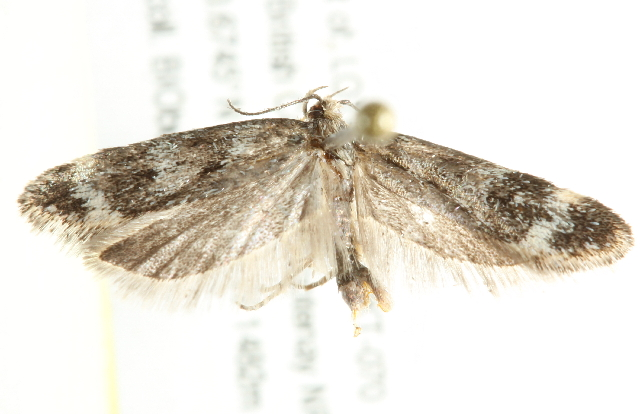

Scientific classification
- Kingdom: Animalia
- Phylum: Arthropoda
- Clade: Pancrustacea
- Class: Insecta
- Order: Lepidoptera
- Family: Gelechiidae
- Genus: Chionodes
- Species: C. continuella

Binomial name
- Chionodes continuella (Zeller, 1839)

Synonyms
- Gelechia continuella Zeller, 1839; Gelechia brumella Clemens, 1864; Gelechia trimaculella Packard, 1867; Gelechia albomaculella Chambers, 1875

= Chionodes continuella =

Species of moth

Chionodes continuella is a moth of the family Gelechiidae. It is found from most of Europe (except Ireland, Great Britain, the Iberian Peninsula, Switzerland and most of the Balkan Peninsula), east to Japan. It is also present in most of North America.

The wingspan is 10–16 mm. Adults have been recorded on wing from June to August in western Europe.

The larvae feed on Pinophyta species, but have also been recorded on Cladonia species, including Cladonia rangiferina.

== Common name ==
The species is sometimes referred to as spring oak leafroller, although the larvae do not feed on oak species. Furthermore, this common name is also applied to Chionodes formosella.
