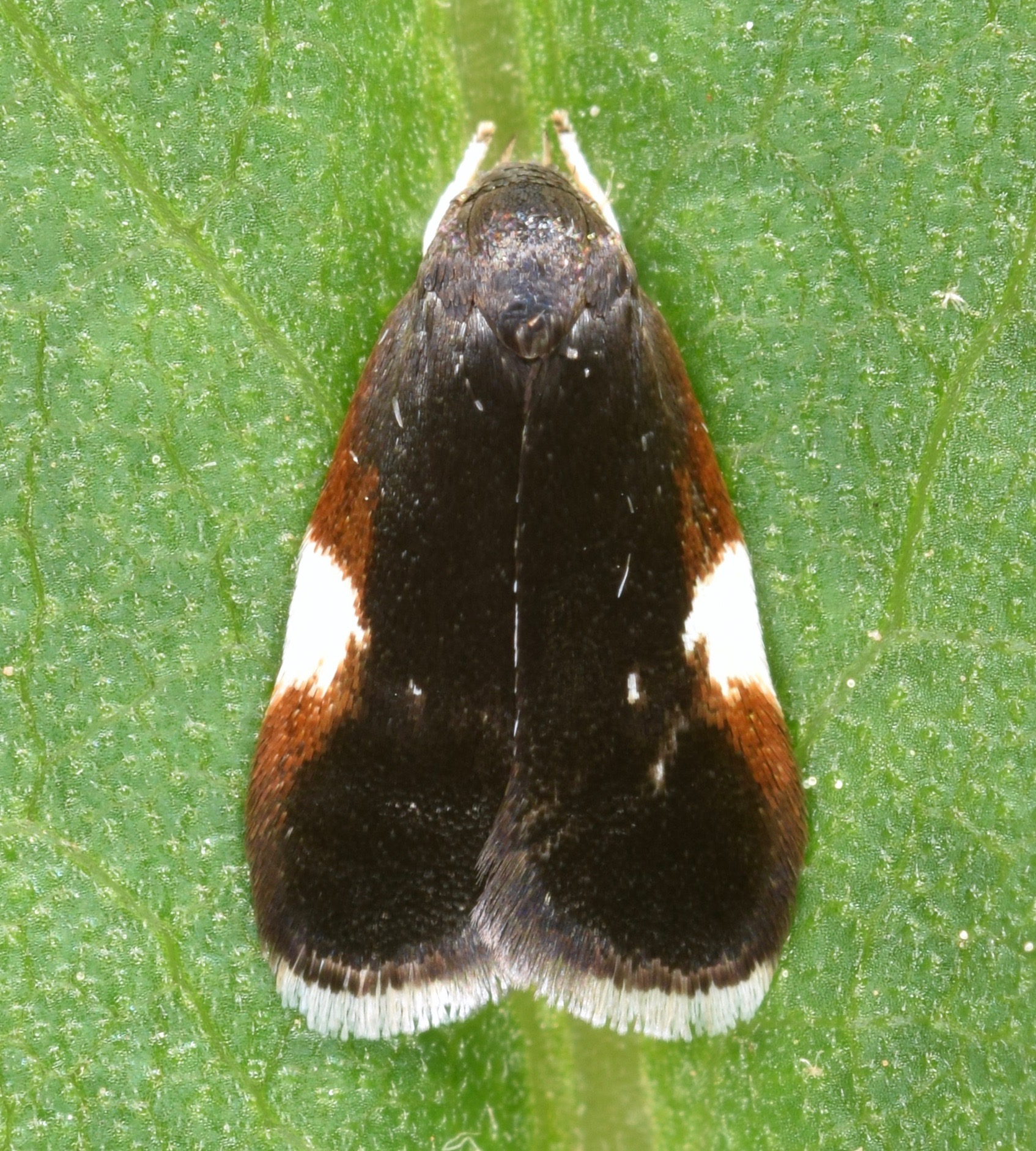

Scientific classification
- Domain: Eukaryota
- Kingdom: Animalia
- Phylum: Arthropoda
- Class: Insecta
- Order: Lepidoptera
- Family: Depressariidae
- Genus: Menesta
- Species: M. melanella

Binomial name
- Menesta melanella Murtfeldt, 1890

= Menesta melanella =

Species of moth

Menesta melanella is a moth in the family Depressariidae. It was described by Mary Murtfeldt in 1890. It is found in North America, where it has been recorded is the states: Alabama, Arizona, Florida, Kentucky, Massachusetts, Mississippi, Missouri, New Jersey, North Carolina, Ohio and South Carolina.

Its wingspan is 10–12 mm. The forewings are blackish brown with greenish-violet reflections, and a triangular patch of white scales on the costa about midway between the base and the apex. The hindwings have a broad white streak extending along the costa from the base to beyond midpoint.

The larvae feed on Quercus obtusiloba and Quercus stellata.
