= Symmetrischema capsica =

Scientific classification
- Kingdom: Animalia
- Phylum: Arthropoda
- Clade: Pancrustacea
- Class: Insecta
- Order: Lepidoptera
- Family: Gelechiidae
- Genus: Symmetrischema
- Species: S. capsica

Binomial name
- Symmetrischema capsica (Bradley & Povolný, 1965)

Synonyms
- Gnorimoschema capsica Bradley & Povolný, 1965

Species of moth

Symmetrischema capsica, the pepper flowerbud moth, is a moth in the family Gelechiidae. It was described by John David Bradley and Dalibor F. Povolný in 1965. It is found Mexico, the West Indies, the Caribbean (Trinidad and Tobago) and the south-eastern United States, where it has been recorded Florida and Texas.

The length of the forewings is 3-3.5 mm.

The larvae feed in the flower buds of Capsicum annuum and Physalis species.
