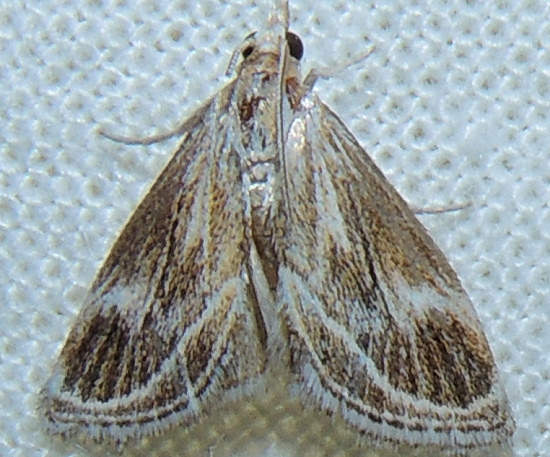
- Frechinia helianthiales

Scientific classification
- Domain: Eukaryota
- Kingdom: Animalia
- Phylum: Arthropoda
- Class: Insecta
- Order: Lepidoptera
- Family: Crambidae
- Tribe: Odontiini
- Genus: Frechinia; Munroe, 1961

= Frechinia =

Genus of moths

Frechinia is a genus of moths of the family Crambidae.

== Species ==
- Frechinia criddlealis (Munroe, 1951)
- Frechinia helianthiales (Murtfeldt, 1897)
- Frechinia laetalis (Barnes & McDunnough, 1914)
- Frechinia lutosalis (Barnes & McDunnough, 1914)
- Frechinia texanalis Munroe, 1961

== Former species ==
- Frechinia murmuralis (Dyar, 1917)
