= Symmetrischema ardeola =

Scientific classification
- Kingdom: Animalia
- Phylum: Arthropoda
- Class: Insecta
- Order: Lepidoptera
- Family: Gelechiidae
- Genus: Symmetrischema
- Species: S. ardeola

Binomial name
- Symmetrischema ardeola (Meyrick, 1931)

Synonyms
- Phthorimaea ardeola Meyrick, 1931

Species of moth

Symmetrischema ardeola is a moth in the family Gelechiidae. It was described by Edward Meyrick in 1931. It is found in Brazil.
