= Frechinia criddlealis =

Scientific classification
- Domain: Eukaryota
- Kingdom: Animalia
- Phylum: Arthropoda
- Class: Insecta
- Order: Lepidoptera
- Family: Crambidae
- Genus: Frechinia
- Species: F. criddlealis

Binomial name
- Frechinia criddlealis (Munroe, 1951)

Synonyms
- Titanio criddlealis Munroe, 1951

Species of moth

Frechinia criddlealis is a moth in the family Crambidae. It was described by Eugene G. Munroe in 1951. It is found in North America where it has been recorded from Arizona, Colorado, Kansas and Manitoba.
