= Symmetrischema atrifascis =

Scientific classification
- Kingdom: Animalia
- Phylum: Arthropoda
- Class: Insecta
- Order: Lepidoptera
- Family: Gelechiidae
- Genus: Symmetrischema
- Species: S. atrifascis

Binomial name
- Symmetrischema atrifascis (Meyrick, 1917)

Synonyms
- Phthorimaea atrifascis Meyrick, 1917

Species of moth

Symmetrischema atrifascis is a moth in the family Gelechiidae. It was described by Edward Meyrick in 1917. It is found in Peru.

The wingspan is 9–10 mm. The forewings are dark grey sprinkled with white and with a blackish dot beneath the costa near the base, as well as an oblique blackish bar from the costa at one-fourth to the fold. The discal stigmata are blackish, indistinctly edged with ochreous beneath, and with the plical ochreous, slightly before the first discal. There are indistinct whitish opposite marks on the costa at three-fourths and the tornus. The hindwings are pale slaty grey, in males with a very long dense black expansible hair-pencil lying along the costa from the base to two-thirds.
