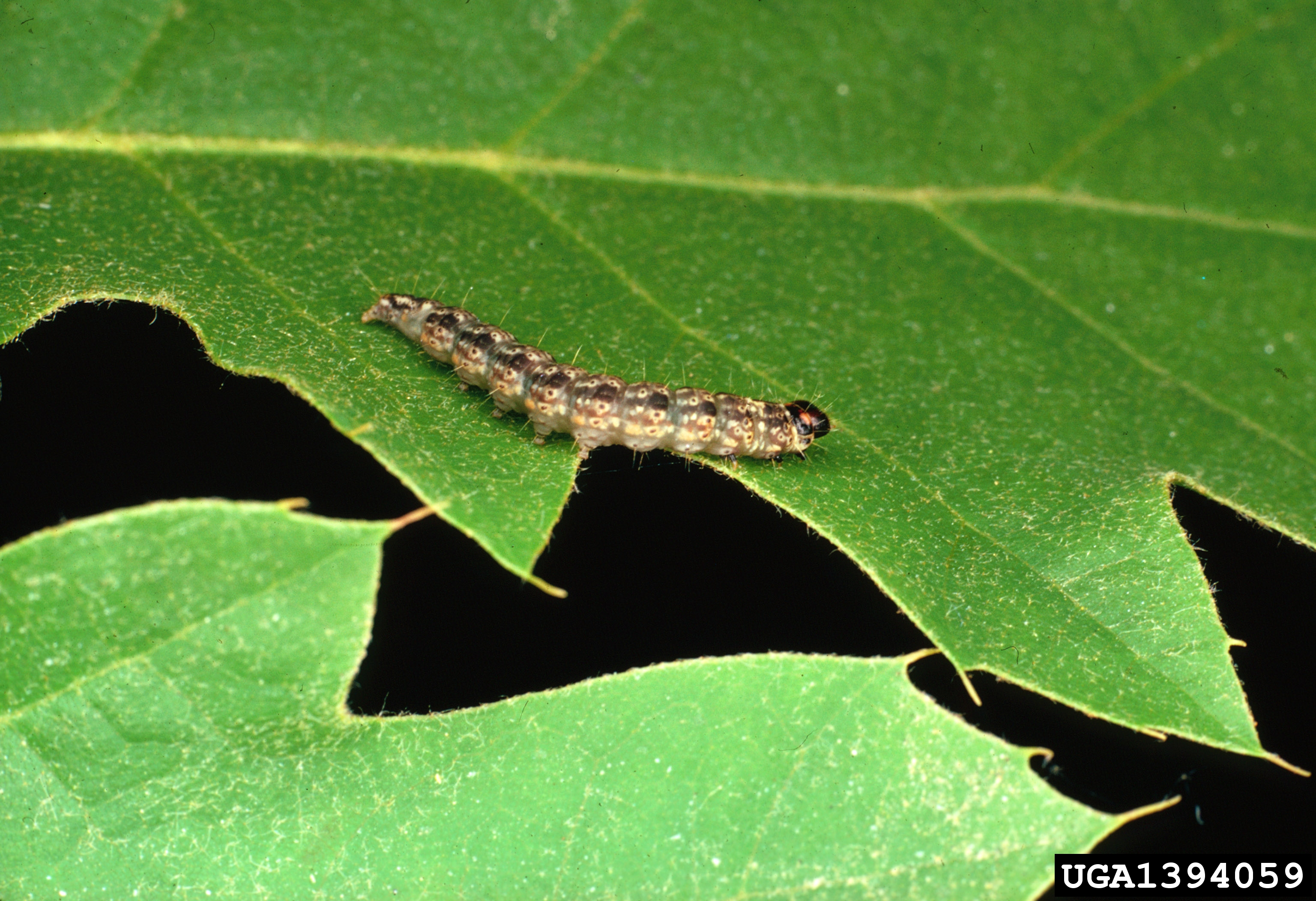

Scientific classification
- Kingdom: Animalia
- Phylum: Arthropoda
- Clade: Pancrustacea
- Class: Insecta
- Order: Lepidoptera
- Family: Gelechiidae
- Genus: Chionodes
- Species: C. formosella

Binomial name
- Chionodes formosella (Murtfeldt, 1881)

Synonyms
- Gelechia formosella Murtfeldt, 1881; Gelechia vernella Murtfeldt, 1883

= Chionodes formosella =

Species of moth

The spring oak leafroller (Chionodes formosella) is a moth of the family Gelechiidae. It is found in North America from Nova Scotia to south-western Manitoba, south to Florida.

The wingspan is about 16 mm.

The larvae feed on oak species, particularly the red oak group. Recorded host plants include Quercus rubra, Quercus velutina, Quercus alba, but also Ostrya virginiana.
