= Symmetrischema borsaniella =

Scientific classification
- Domain: Eukaryota
- Kingdom: Animalia
- Phylum: Arthropoda
- Class: Insecta
- Order: Lepidoptera
- Family: Gelechiidae
- Genus: Symmetrischema
- Species: S. borsaniella

Binomial name
- Symmetrischema borsaniella (Köhler, 1939)

Synonyms
- Gnorimoschema borsaniella Köhler, 1939

Species of moth

Symmetrischema borsaniella is a moth in the family Gelechiidae. It was described by Paul Köhler in 1939. It is found in Argentina.
