= Frechinia laetalis =

Scientific classification
- Domain: Eukaryota
- Kingdom: Animalia
- Phylum: Arthropoda
- Class: Insecta
- Order: Lepidoptera
- Family: Crambidae
- Genus: Frechinia
- Species: F. laetalis

Binomial name
- Frechinia laetalis (Barnes & McDunnough, 1914)

Synonyms
- Titanio laetalis Barnes & McDunnough, 1914

Species of moth

Frechinia laetalis is a moth in the family Crambidae. It was described by William Barnes and James Halliday McDunnough in 1914. It is found in North America, where it has been recorded from eastern Washington and Oregon to Utah, southern California and western Texas.

The length of the forewings is 4.5–6 mm. Adults have been recorded on wing from March to October.

The larvae feed on Ambrosia species. They mine the leaves of their host plant.
