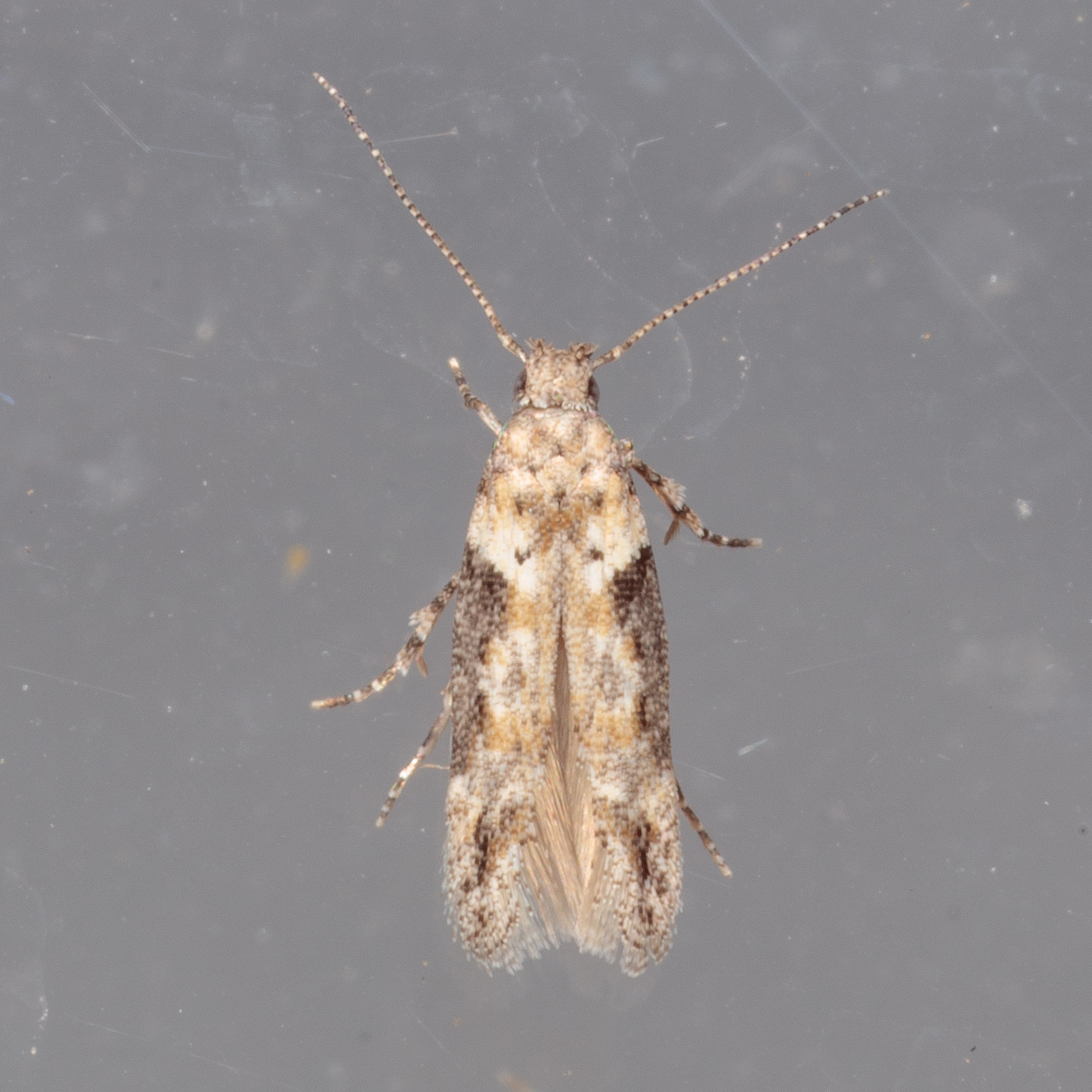

Scientific classification
- Kingdom: Animalia
- Phylum: Arthropoda
- Clade: Pancrustacea
- Class: Insecta
- Order: Lepidoptera
- Family: Gelechiidae
- Genus: Symmetrischema
- Species: S. costaricanum

Binomial name
- Symmetrischema costaricanum Povolný, 1990

= Symmetrischema costaricanum =

Species of moth

Symmetrischema costaricanum is a species of moth in the family Gelechiidae. It was first described by Dalibor Povolný in 1990. It is found in Costa Rica.
