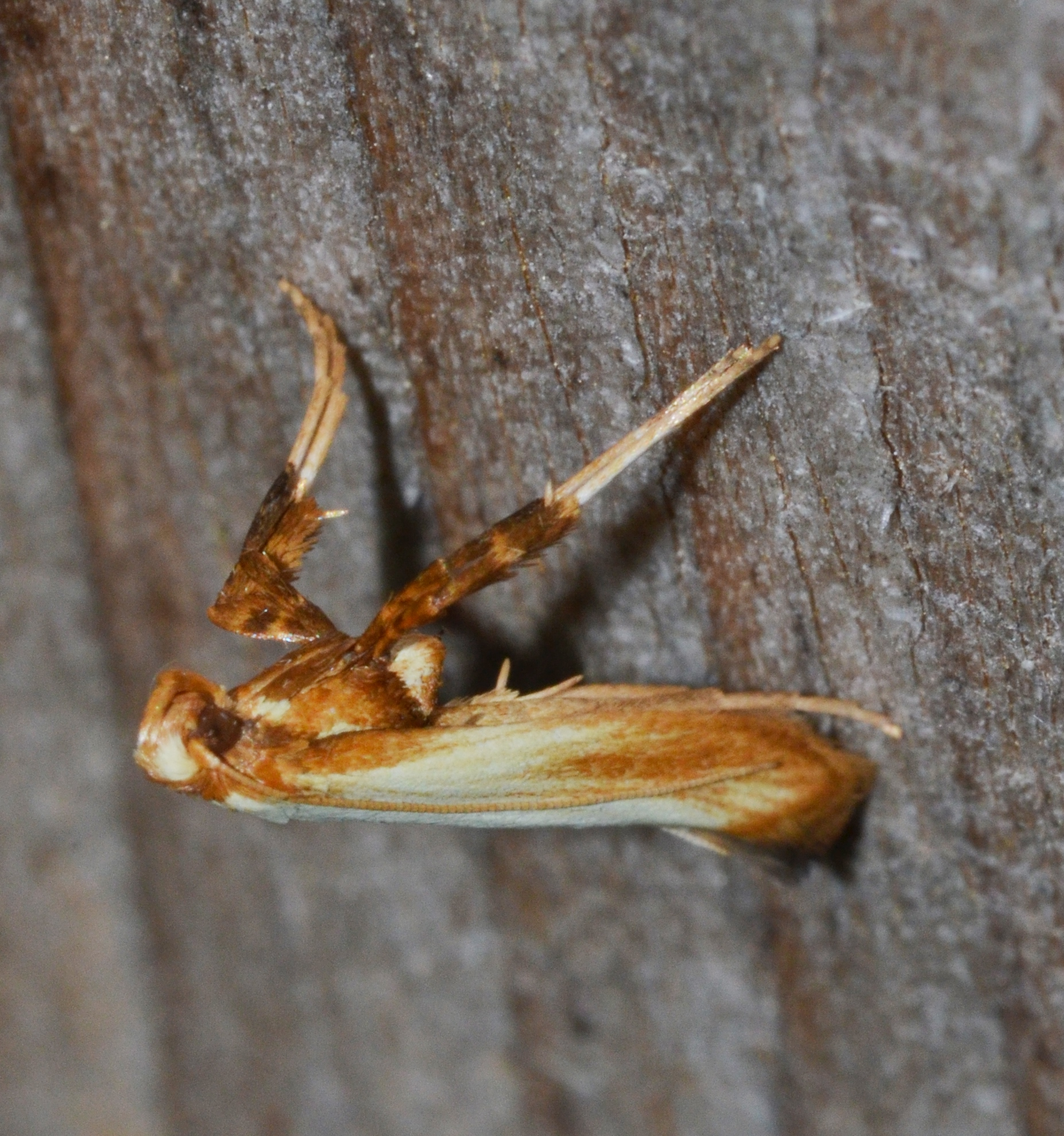
- The moth Caloptilia murtfeldtella

Scientific classification
- Domain: Eukaryota
- Kingdom: Animalia
- Phylum: Arthropoda
- Class: Insecta
- Order: Lepidoptera
- Family: Gracillariidae
- Genus: Caloptilia
- Species: C. murtfeldtella

Binomial name
- Caloptilia murtfeldtella (Busck, 1904)

= Caloptilia murtfeldtella =

Species of moth

Caloptilia murtfeldtella is a moth of the family Gracillariidae. It is known from Missouri, Washington, California, Kentucky, Michigan and Ohio in the United States.

The wingspan is about 18 mm.

The larvae feed on Pentstemon hirsutus, Pentstemon laevigatus and Pentstemon peckii. They create a stem gall. One or more galls may occur per stem, but only one larva inhabits each gall. The galls occur low on the stem. When full-grown, the larva chews a tunnel outwardly through almost the entire wall of the gall, leaving only the external epidermal layer as a round, externally visible window. It then spins a cocoon, one end of which is anchored to the bottom end of the gall, the other end is spun so as to encircle the window. The species overwinters in the adult stage.

This species is named after naturalist Mary Murtfeldt who collected the specimens used by August Busck to first describe the species.
