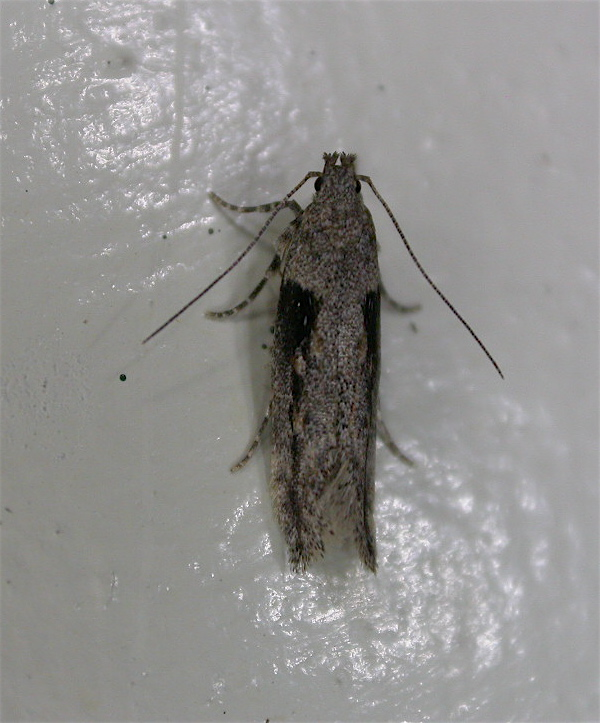
- Symmetrischema tangolias

Scientific classification
- Kingdom: Animalia
- Phylum: Arthropoda
- Clade: Pancrustacea
- Class: Insecta
- Order: Lepidoptera
- Family: Gelechiidae
- Subfamily: Gelechiinae
- Genus: Symmetrischema; Povolný, 1967

Synonyms
- Symmetrichema Povolný, 1967; Symmetrischemulum Povolný, 1989; Primischema Povolný, 1989

= Symmetrischema =

Genus of moths

Symmetrischema is a genus of moths in the family Gelechiidae.

== Species ==
- Symmetrischema alternatum Povolný, 1990
- Symmetrischema alticolum (Povolný, 1990)
- Symmetrischema altisona (Meyrick, 1917)
- Symmetrischema andinum Povolný, 1990
- Symmetrischema anthracinum Povolný, 1990
- Symmetrischema anthracoides Povolný, 1990
- Symmetrischema arctanderi Povolný, 1990
- Symmetrischema ardeola (Meyrick, 1931)
- Symmetrischema assimile Povolný, 1990
- Symmetrischema atrifascis (Meyrick, 1917)
- Symmetrischema borsaniella (Köhler, 1939)
- Symmetrischema capsica (Bradley & Povolný, 1965)
- Symmetrischema capsicivorum Povolný, 1973
- Symmetrischema cestrivora (Clarke, 1950)
- Symmetrischema conifera (Meyrick, 1916)
- Symmetrischema costaricanum Povolný, 1990
- Symmetrischema disciferum Povolný, 1989
- Symmetrischema draculinum Povolný, 1989
- Symmetrischema dulce Povolný, 1984
- Symmetrischema elementare Povolný, 1989
- Symmetrischema escondidella Landry, 2010
- Symmetrischema femininum Povolný, 1989
- Symmetrischema fercularia (Meyrick, 1929)
- Symmetrischema funebrale Povolný, 1990
- Symmetrischema grandispinum Povolný, 1990
- Symmetrischema inexpectatum Povolný, 1967
- Symmetrischema inkorum Povolný, 1990
- Symmetrischema insertum Povolný, 1988
- Symmetrischema kendallorum Blanchard & Knudson, 1982
- Symmetrischema krabbei Povolný, 1990
- Symmetrischema lavernella (Chambers, 1874)
- Symmetrischema lectulifera (Meyrick, 1929)
- Symmetrischema loquax (Meyrick, 1917)
- Symmetrischema major Povolný, 1990
- Symmetrischema nanum Povolný, 1989
- Symmetrischema nummulatum Povolný, 1989
- Symmetrischema oblitum Povolný, 1989
- Symmetrischema pallidochrella (Chambers, 1872)
- Symmetrischema peruanum Povolný, 1990
- Symmetrischema piperinum Povolný, 1989
- Symmetrischema primigenium Povolný, 1989
- Symmetrischema pulchrum Povolný, 1989
- Symmetrischema purum Povolný, 1990
- Symmetrischema respectabile Povolný, 1989
- Symmetrischema senex Povolný, 1990
- Symmetrischema solitare Povolný, 1989
- Symmetrischema solum Povolný, 1989
- Symmetrischema striatella (Murtfeldt, 1900)
- Symmetrischema symmetricum Povolný, 1990
- Symmetrischema tangolias (Gyen, 1913)
- Symmetrischema ventralella (Zeller, 1877)

== Status unclear ==
- Symmetrischema solani (Berg), described as Gelechia solani from South America
