= Menesta cinereocervina =

Scientific classification
- Kingdom: Animalia
- Phylum: Arthropoda
- Class: Insecta
- Order: Lepidoptera
- Family: Depressariidae
- Genus: Menesta
- Species: M. cinereocervina

Binomial name
- Menesta cinereocervina (Walsingham, [1892])

Synonyms
- Gelechia cinereocervina Walsingham, [1892]

Species of moth

Menesta cinereocervina is a moth in the family Depressariidae. It was described by Lord Walsingham in 1892. It is found in the West Indies, where it has been recorded from St. Vincent.

The wingspan is about 8 mm. The forewings are dull greyish fawn, with a small fuscous spot on the middle, followed by another at the end of the cell, slightly preceded by one below it on the fold. There is an elongate narrow fuscous shade along the costal margin beyond the middle and four fuscous dots around the apex, two on the costal and two on the apical margin. The hindwings are grey.
