= Symmetrischema cestrivora =

Scientific classification
- Domain: Eukaryota
- Kingdom: Animalia
- Phylum: Arthropoda
- Class: Insecta
- Order: Lepidoptera
- Family: Gelechiidae
- Genus: Symmetrischema
- Species: S. cestrivora

Binomial name
- Symmetrischema cestrivora (Clarke, 1950)

Synonyms
- Gnorimoschema cestrivora Clarke, 1950

Species of moth

Symmetrischema cestrivora is a moth in the family Gelechiidae. It was described by Clarke in 1950. It is found in Argentina (Tucuman).

The larvae feed on Cestrum lorentzianum.
