= Symmetrischema lectulifera =

Scientific classification
- Domain: Eukaryota
- Kingdom: Animalia
- Phylum: Arthropoda
- Class: Insecta
- Order: Lepidoptera
- Family: Gelechiidae
- Genus: Symmetrischema
- Species: S. lectulifera

Binomial name
- Symmetrischema lectulifera (Meyrick, 1929)

Synonyms
- Gnorimoschema lectulifera Meyrick, 1929; Symmetrischema lectuliferum

Species of moth

Symmetrischema lectulifera is a moth in the family Gelechiidae. It was described by Edward Meyrick in 1929. It is found in North America, where it has been recorded Texas.

The wingspan is 13–16 mm.
