= Symmetrischema conifera =

Scientific classification
- Kingdom: Animalia
- Phylum: Arthropoda
- Class: Insecta
- Order: Lepidoptera
- Family: Gelechiidae
- Genus: Symmetrischema
- Species: S. conifera

Binomial name
- Symmetrischema conifera (Meyrick, 1916)

Synonyms
- Chelaria conifera Meyrick, 1916

Species of moth

Symmetrischema conifera is a moth in the family Gelechiidae. It was described by Edward Meyrick in 1916. It is found in Ecuador.

The wingspan is 15–16 mm. The forewings are whitish ochreous suffusedly sprinkled with ochreous grey, the dorsal half irregularly sprinkled with dark grey and with an elongate-triangular blackish blotch extending on the costa from one-fourth to three-fourths, the anterior side less than half the posterior, the apex reaching the fold, the posterior side excavated in the middle. There is also a short blackish apical streak. The hindwings are grey.
