= Menesta astronoma =

Scientific classification
- Kingdom: Animalia
- Phylum: Arthropoda
- Class: Insecta
- Order: Lepidoptera
- Family: Depressariidae
- Genus: Menesta
- Species: M. astronoma

Binomial name
- Menesta astronoma (Meyrick, 1909)

Synonyms
- Stenoma astronoma Meyrick, 1909

Species of moth

Menesta astronoma is a moth in the Depressariidae family found in Bolivia. It was described by Edward Meyrick in 1909. It is

The wingspan is about 11 mm. The forewings are very dark bronzy-fuscous with a streak of blue-metallic suffusion beneath the anterior half of the costa and a small round white spot in the disc at two-thirds, immediately beyond this a broad transverse fascia of violet-blue-metallic suffusion not quite reaching the costa and tornus. Two white specks are found on the costa above this. The hindwings are dark fuscous with a rather large transverse white discal spot in the middle, almost reaching the costa.
