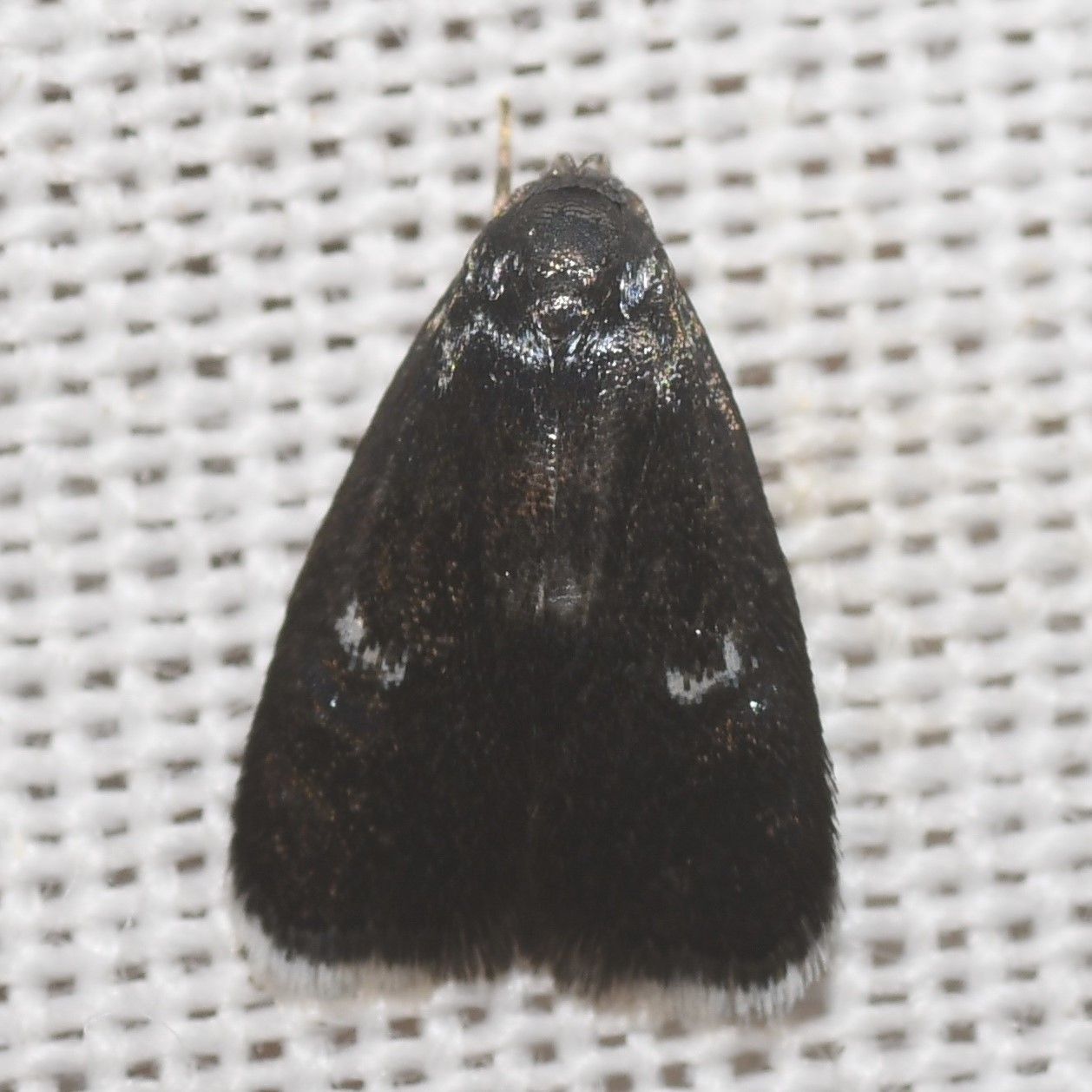

Scientific classification
- Kingdom: Animalia
- Phylum: Arthropoda
- Clade: Pancrustacea
- Class: Insecta
- Order: Lepidoptera
- Family: Depressariidae
- Genus: Menesta
- Species: M. tortriciformella

Binomial name
- Menesta tortriciformella Clemens, 1860

Synonyms
- Gelechia liturella Walker, 1864; Hyale coryliella Chambers, 1875; Strobisia albaciliaeella Chambers, 1878

= Menesta tortriciformella =

Species of moth

Menesta tortriciformella is a species of moth in the family Depressariidae. It was first described by James Brackenridge Clemens in 1860. It is found in North America, where it has been recorded from Florida, Georgia, Illinois, Kentucky, Maryland, Mississippi, New Hampshire, New Jersey, New York, Ohio, Pennsylvania, Virginia, Ontario, Nova Scotia.

The wingspan is 9–10 mm. The forewings are blackish brown with greenish-violet reflections and a few white scales just beyond the middle forming an indistinct, short, transverse line. The hindwings are much lighter brown.

The larvae feed on Corylus americana and Rubus allegheniensis.
