= Symmetrischema ventralella =

Scientific classification
- Kingdom: Animalia
- Phylum: Arthropoda
- Clade: Pancrustacea
- Class: Insecta
- Order: Lepidoptera
- Family: Gelechiidae
- Genus: Symmetrischema
- Species: S. ventralella

Binomial name
- Symmetrischema ventralella (Zeller, 1877)

Synonyms
- Gelechia (Teleia) ventralella Zeller, 1877

Species of moth

Symmetrischema ventralella is a moth in the family Gelechiidae. It was described by Philipp Christoph Zeller in 1877. It is found in Colombia.
