= Menesta succinctella =

Scientific classification
- Kingdom: Animalia
- Phylum: Arthropoda
- Class: Insecta
- Order: Lepidoptera
- Family: Depressariidae
- Genus: Menesta
- Species: M. succinctella

Binomial name
- Menesta succinctella (Walker, 1864)

Synonyms
- Gelechia succinctella Walker, 1864

Species of moth

Menesta succinctella is a moth in the family Depressariidae. It was described by Francis Walker in 1864. It is found in Amazonas, Brazil.

Adults are dark cupreous brown, with the forewings purplish tinged. The exterior border and fringe are white. The hindwings are more cupreous, with the fringe mostly white towards the tips and the costa whitish, except towards the tip.
