= Symmetrischema oblitum =

Scientific classification
- Kingdom: Animalia
- Phylum: Arthropoda
- Clade: Pancrustacea
- Class: Insecta
- Order: Lepidoptera
- Family: Gelechiidae
- Genus: Symmetrischema
- Species: S. oblitum

Binomial name
- Symmetrischema oblitum Povolný, 1989

Species of moth

Symmetrischema oblitum is a moth in the family Gelechiidae. It was described by Povolný in 1989. It is found in Argentina.
