= Frechinia lutosalis =

Scientific classification
- Kingdom: Animalia
- Phylum: Arthropoda
- Class: Insecta
- Order: Lepidoptera
- Family: Crambidae
- Genus: Frechinia
- Species: F. lutosalis

Binomial name
- Frechinia lutosalis (Barnes & McDunnough, 1914)

Synonyms
- Titanio lutosalis Barnes & McDunnough, 1914

Species of moth

Frechinia lutosalis is a moth in the family Crambidae. It was described by William Barnes and James Halliday McDunnough in 1914. It is found in North America, where it has been recorded from Arizona, Colorado and New Mexico.

The wingspan is about 20 mm. The forewings are olive green, suffused with white and with a white basal dash. The terminal area is paler than the median area. The hindwings are dark smoky with a darker terminal line. Adults have been recorded on wing from June to August.
