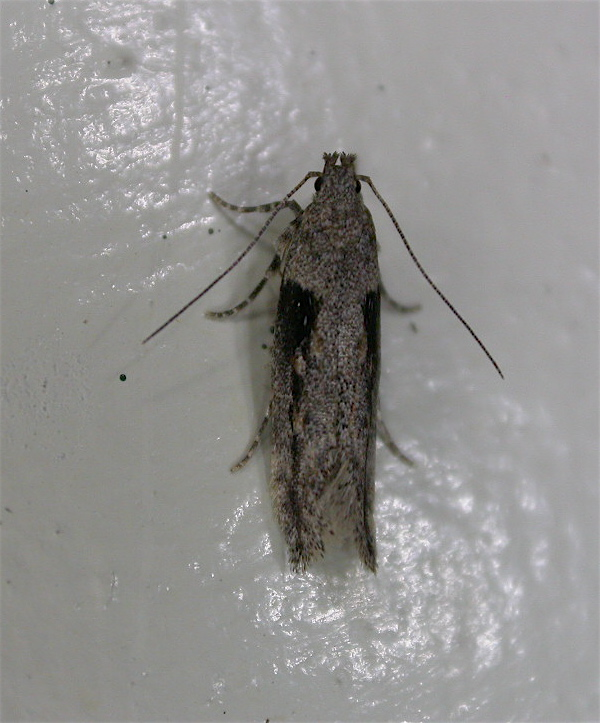

Scientific classification
- Kingdom: Animalia
- Phylum: Arthropoda
- Class: Insecta
- Order: Lepidoptera
- Family: Gelechiidae
- Genus: Symmetrischema
- Species: S. tangolias

Binomial name
- Symmetrischema tangolias (Gyen, 1913)

Synonyms
- Trichotaphe tangolias Gyen, 1913; Phthorimaea plaesiosoma Turner, 1919; Phthorimaea aquilina Meyrick, 1917; Phthorimaea melanoplintha Meyrick, 1926; Gnorimoschema tuberosella Busck, 1931

= Symmetrischema tangolias =

Species of moth

The South American potato tuber moth, Andean potato tuber moth or tomato stemborer (Symmetrischema tangolias) is a moth of the family Gelechiidae. It is native to South America, but has become a pest worldwide. Records include North America, Australia and New Zealand.

== Species Description ==
Tomato stemborer eggs are shaped oval and have a size of 0.7 x 0.4 mm for a freshly laid egg. The colouration changes to orange-yellow when the eggs start to develop and turn to dark gray before hatching. However, there is not much known about the caterpillar stage on tomato stemborer. Adult moths typically lay their eggs on invaded plants during nighttime. The larva is typically slender and cylindrical with pinkish, dark head capsule and segments are distinct; caterpillar has small, bristle-like structures on its body. The pupal stage occurs within a cocoon, with dark brown colouration encased in a protective shell.

The adult moth has distinctive black triangle patches along the lateral margins of its forewings, giving it a brownish-gray (silver-gray) appearance. The forewing margins are rimmed with hairs. Pale-coloured scales encircle the hindwings, which are narrower and shorter than the forewings. The adult moth's body length is between 6–9 mm, and it measures ~9–12 mm when it is at rest. The wingspan is roughly ~18–19 mm. Moreover, the female abdomen is broader, has a blunt end, while the male abdomen is smaller, and has a cone-shaped structure.

== Range ==
=== Natural global range ===
Tomato stemborer is considered native to the Andean mountain region in South America, specifically surrounding Peru and Bolivia. The species is a worldwide pest commonly found in tomatoes and potatoes. Their presence is reported in the United States, Australia, and New Zealand, respectively. The species is present in the northern part of South America, specifically Ecuador and Colombia. Recently, it is also recorded in Indonesia and Chile.

=== New Zealand range ===
It is believed that tomato stemborer was introduced in New Zealand from South America through anthropogenic activities. The larvae were first discovered burrowing into the stem of a native plant, Solanum aviculare on October 4, 1979, in Waitara, Taranaki. On February 14, 1980, small caterpillars were identified as tomato stemborers, and they were found to be connected to dark lesions on stems and near leaf nodes. Later, it was also found that the tomato stemborer also feeds on S. aviculare on Takaka Hill, Riwaka, Nelson, Pukekohe, and Mount Albert Research Centre, Auckland.

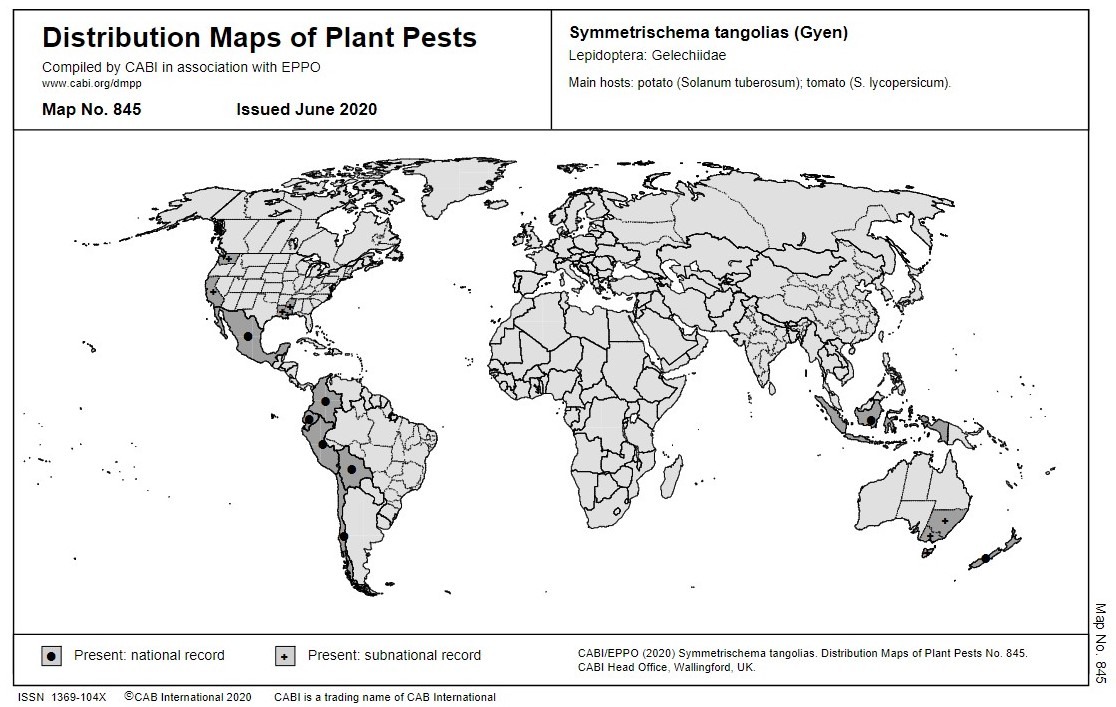
Figure 1. Distribution Map of Symmetrischema tangolias (Gyen)

== Habitat ==
The larvae life stages are located in tomato/potato leaves, petioles, stems, and tubers. Furthermore, it prefers to live in a sub-temperate climate, where temperature is optimum for their survival.

== Ecology ==
=== Life cycle/Phenology ===
After emergence, the female moth can live up to 3-4 nights; tomato stemborers have 12 overlapping lifecycles in a year and each lifecycle lasts for 4–7 weeks. Adult moths typically lay their eggs on invaded plants during nighttime.

Tomato stemborer feeds on tuber stems and solanaceous plants during its larval stage. Their eggs sit in the slits of stems and neonate larvae enter stems through plant axils. This causes excrement in the entry hole of the host plant. Furthermore, severe stem damage can also result in the host plant wilting or leading the infested stem to bend-off. Usually, the larvae enters through the stem buds, which are immature growth points of the host plant, on a wound, which could also introduce microorganisms that cause secondary infections. Moreover, the pupa develops along the plant debris and exits through a hole ~2–3 mm in diameter. It will take around one day before emerging as an adult. Adult females will lay approximately 140-185 eggs on the leaxils of the host plant. Then, the cycle repeats.

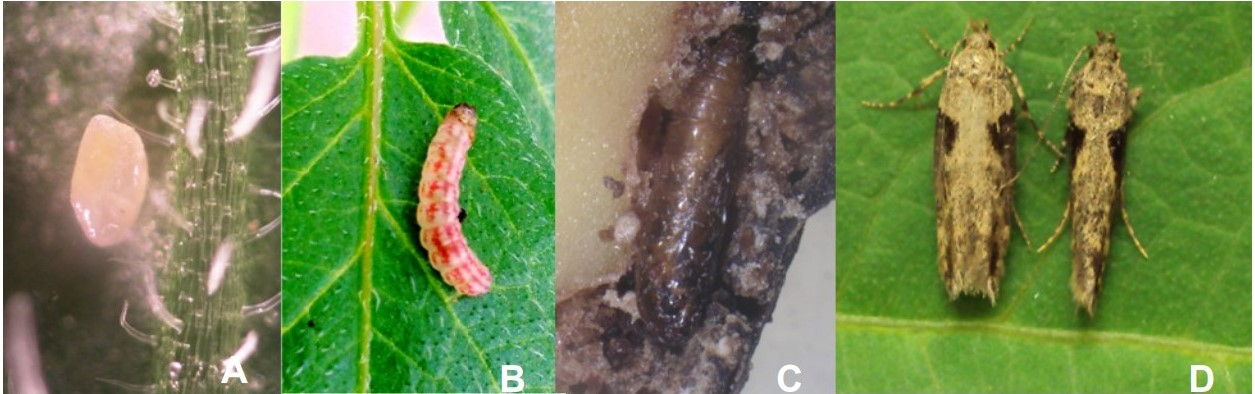
Figure 2. Development stage of Symmetrischema tangolias (Gyen) A. egg stage; B. larva stage; C. pupa stage; D. adult stage (male: left; female: right)

=== Diet and foraging ===
Tomato stemborer parasitizes and forages on tomato/potato leaves, petioles, stems, and tubers during its larval stage. However, in North America, tomato stemborer tend to feed on black nightshade. Moreover, the species has a high preference towards solanaceous plants in general.

=== Predators, Parasites, and Diseases ===
Possible predators of tomato stemborer are from a variety of insect orders, which includes Heteroptera, Hymenoptera, Dermaptera, Coleoptera, Neuroptera, and Thysanoptera. Some predator species are from arachnid families, this include Phytoseiidae and Lycosidae. These orders have proven useful as biocontrol agents against Tuta absoluta, which is in the same family as tomato stemborer. However, further study is needed to fully understand how these predators interact with other biocontrol agents. It would also be beneficial to conduct additional research on selecting insecticide and the most effective natural predators.

== Other information ==
Tomato stemborer life cycle is highly dependent on temperature. Temperatures around 10-28 °C are optimal for larval growth. Furthermore, eggs and pupae has a high survival rate >80% when temperature conditions are met; immature development takes around 190 days. However, higher temperatures eventually lead to slower growth in larvae, and the threshold for a lower temperature is roughly ~8 °C. This also applies to the adult moth, which causes their reproduction and oviposition rates to decline when temperature conditions are not suitable.

When tomato stemborer coexists with Phthorimaea opercuella, crop damage may increase compared to when the species occurs alone, potentially leading to financial losses. Although field losses in the Andes regions in South America can amount to up to 30%, the most economically significant damage is when infected tomatoes or tubers are moved to stores where they become re-infested. Within three to four months of storage, farmers who do not have proper protection risk losing all of their house-stored solanaceous produce.

(3E,7Z)-Tetradecadienyl acetate is the major sex pheromone for this species. This could help to control the population of S. tangolias, as pheromone traps are used to draw in male adults. Sex-pheromone-baited water or funnel traps reveal the presence of S. tangolias population and this helps tto dentify S.tangolias early on to help with early pest management response.

Tomato stemborer might decrease their potential establishment on tropical and subtropical regions due to rising temperatures from climate change. However, there is a high possibility where population might increase in temperate regions; it is possible that tomato stemborer will spread to several other regions, most likely in Western Europe, in particular, settling in Spain, France, Italy, and potentially Ireland.

It is hard to detect the egg or larval stage of tomato stemborer especially when it is infesting crop products. One recommendation is the ban on imports of products from countries with high population of S. tangolias. Thus, preventing the spread of the pest.
