= Symmetrischema pallidochrella =

Scientific classification
- Domain: Eukaryota
- Kingdom: Animalia
- Phylum: Arthropoda
- Class: Insecta
- Order: Lepidoptera
- Family: Gelechiidae
- Genus: Symmetrischema
- Species: S. pallidochrella

Binomial name
- Symmetrischema pallidochrella (Chambers, 1872)

Synonyms
- Depressaria pallidochrella Chambers, 1872; Gnorimoschema pallidochrella; Helice pallidochrella

Species of moth

Symmetrischema pallidochrella is a moth in the family Gelechiidae. It was described by Vactor Tousey Chambers in 1872 and is found in North America.

== Description ==
The base of the forewings is pale ocherous, sparsely dusted with fuscous and with a fuscous line across the wing close to the base. A fuscous streak passes obliquely backwards to the fold at the basal one-fourth, and then the wing is pale ocherous to the apex, rather densely dusted with fuscous and dark ocherous, with the extreme apex fuscous. The hindwings are pale fuscous.

== Distribution ==
It is found in North America, where it has been recorded in Kentucky, Illinois, Ohio and Oklahoma. The moth was found at Landguard Bird Observatory, Felixstowe, Suffolk in June 2019, presumably as an accidental import into the UK.
