= Symmetrischema dulce =

Scientific classification
- Kingdom: Animalia
- Phylum: Arthropoda
- Clade: Pancrustacea
- Class: Insecta
- Order: Lepidoptera
- Family: Gelechiidae
- Genus: Symmetrischema
- Species: S. dulce

Binomial name
- Symmetrischema dulce Povolný, 1984

Species of moth

Symmetrischema dulce, the pepper-fruit-borer, is a moth in the family Gelechiidae. It was described by Povolný in 1984. It is found in Brazil.

The larvae feed on Capsicum frutescens.
