= Symmetrischema loquax =

Scientific classification
- Kingdom: Animalia
- Phylum: Arthropoda
- Class: Insecta
- Order: Lepidoptera
- Family: Gelechiidae
- Genus: Symmetrischema
- Species: S. loquax

Binomial name
- Symmetrischema loquax (Meyrick, 1917)

Synonyms
- Phthorimaea loquax Meyrick, 1917

Species of moth

Symmetrischema loquax is a moth in the family Gelechiidae. It was described by Edward Meyrick in 1917. It is found in Peru.

== Description ==
The wingspan is 9–10 mm. The forewings are dark grey sprinkled with whitish, tinged here and there with ochreous. There is a black dot beneath the costa near the base, and two or three other indistinct ones on the basal area. A small black costal spot is found before one-third. Sometimes, there are ochreous subcostal dashes before and beyond this. The stigmata are moderate or large, ochreous brownish, sometimes accompanied by a few blackish scales, and with the plical slightly before the first discal. A blackish dot is found on the fold beneath the middle of the wing. There is a small cloudy darker spot on the costa at two-thirds and a cloudy darker dot above the tornus, as well as a cloudy spot of dark fuscous suffusion on the termen above the tornus and an elongate blackish mark in the disc near the apex. The hindwings are slaty grey.
