= Symmetrischema altisona =

Scientific classification
- Kingdom: Animalia
- Phylum: Arthropoda
- Class: Insecta
- Order: Lepidoptera
- Family: Gelechiidae
- Genus: Symmetrischema
- Species: S. altisona

Binomial name
- Symmetrischema altisona (Meyrick, 1917)

Synonyms
- Phthorimaea altisona Meyrick, 1917

Species of moth

Symmetrischema altisona is a moth in the family Gelechiidae. It was described by Edward Meyrick in 1917. It is found in Peru.

The wingspan is 11–12 mm. The forewings are dark fuscous, slightly whitish sprinkled, and with the dorsal area tinged with ochreous brown. The stigmata are cloudy and black, with the plical obliquely before the first discal. The hindwings are bluish grey.
