= Frechinia texanalis =

Scientific classification
- Domain: Eukaryota
- Kingdom: Animalia
- Phylum: Arthropoda
- Class: Insecta
- Order: Lepidoptera
- Family: Crambidae
- Genus: Frechinia
- Species: F. texanalis

Binomial name
- Frechinia texanalis Munroe, 1961

Species of moth

Frechinia texanalis is a moth in the family Crambidae. It was described by Eugene G. Munroe in 1961. It is found in North America, where it has been recorded from Texas.

The wingspan is about 14 mm. Adults have been recorded on wing in May.
