= Symmetrischema inexpectatum =

Scientific classification
- Kingdom: Animalia
- Phylum: Arthropoda
- Clade: Pancrustacea
- Class: Insecta
- Order: Lepidoptera
- Family: Gelechiidae
- Genus: Symmetrischema
- Species: S. inexpectatum

Binomial name
- Symmetrischema inexpectatum Povolný, 1967

Species of moth

Symmetrischema inexpectatum is a moth in the family Gelechiidae. It was described by Povolný in 1967. It is found in North America, where it has been recorded from Texas.
