= Symmetrischema kendallorum =

Scientific classification
- Domain: Eukaryota
- Kingdom: Animalia
- Phylum: Arthropoda
- Class: Insecta
- Order: Lepidoptera
- Family: Gelechiidae
- Genus: Symmetrischema
- Species: S. kendallorum

Binomial name
- Symmetrischema kendallorum Blanchard & Knudson, 1982

Species of moth

Symmetrischema kendallorum is a moth in the family Gelechiidae. It was described by André Blanchard and Edward C. Knudson in 1982. It is found in North America, where it has been recorded Texas.

The length of the forewings are 4.9–6 mm for males and 5-6.6 mm for females. The forewings are light ocherous, largely obscured by extensive fulvous overscaling and grayish-black patches. An extensive grayish-black patch occupies the middle of the forewing, from the costal margin to the fold and is interrupted by two fulvous spots in the cell. These are narrowly edged with the ground color. A single row of grayish-black scales extends along the dorsal margin, broadening to form a grayish-black patch near the base. The hindwings are light fuscous.

The larvae feed on Physalis virginiana var. spathulaefolia. They feed within galls on the upper stems. Pupation also takes place in these galls.
