= Symmetrischema insertum =

Scientific classification
- Kingdom: Animalia
- Phylum: Arthropoda
- Clade: Pancrustacea
- Class: Insecta
- Order: Lepidoptera
- Family: Gelechiidae
- Genus: Symmetrischema
- Species: S. insertum

Binomial name
- Symmetrischema insertum Povolný, 1988

Species of moth

Symmetrischema insertum is a moth in the family Gelechiidae. It was described by Povolný in 1988. It is found in Colombia.

The larvae feed on Solanum quitoense.
