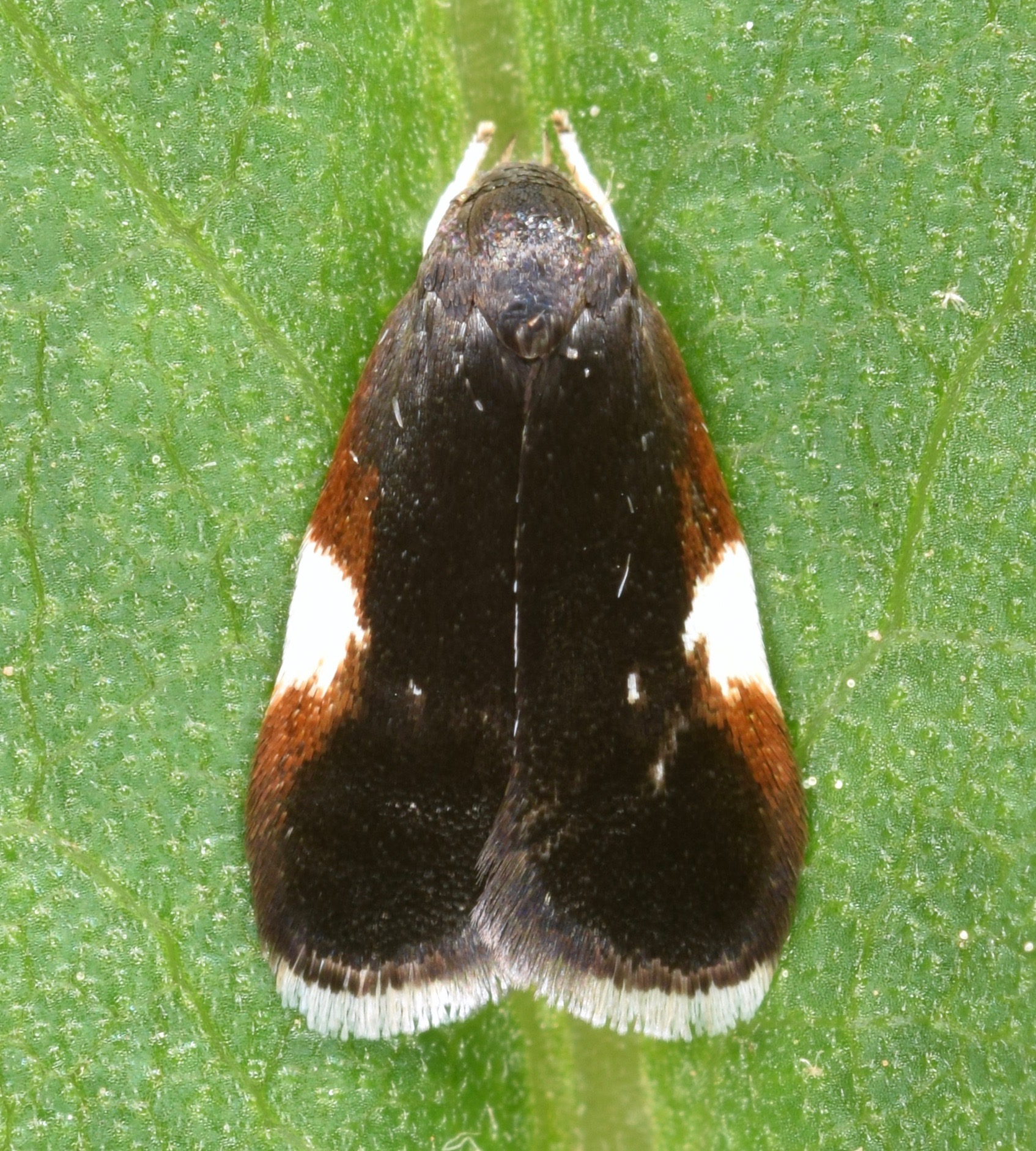
- Menesta melanella

Scientific classification
- Kingdom: Animalia
- Phylum: Arthropoda
- Clade: Pancrustacea
- Class: Insecta
- Order: Lepidoptera
- Family: Depressariidae
- Subfamily: Stenomatinae
- Genus: Menesta; Clemens, 1860

Synonyms
- Hyale Chambers, 1875

= Menesta =

Genus of moths

Menesta is a moth genus of the family Depressariidae.

== Species ==
- Menesta astronoma (Meyrick, 1909)
- Menesta cinereocervina (Walsingham, [1892])
- Menesta melanella Murtfeldt, 1890
- Menesta succinctella (Walker, 1864)
- Menesta tortriciformella Clemens, 1860
