= Symmetrischema fercularia =

Scientific classification
- Kingdom: Animalia
- Phylum: Arthropoda
- Class: Insecta
- Order: Lepidoptera
- Family: Gelechiidae
- Genus: Symmetrischema
- Species: S. fercularia

Binomial name
- Symmetrischema fercularia (Meyrick, 1929)

Synonyms
- Gnorimoschema fercularia Meyrick, 1929

Species of moth

Symmetrischema fercularia is a moth in the family Gelechiidae. It was described by Edward Meyrick in 1929. It is found in North America, where it has been recorded Texas.

The wingspan is 10–12 mm.
