= Symmetrischema lavernella =

Scientific classification
- Kingdom: Animalia
- Phylum: Arthropoda
- Clade: Pancrustacea
- Class: Insecta
- Order: Lepidoptera
- Family: Gelechiidae
- Genus: Symmetrischema
- Species: S. lavernella

Binomial name
- Symmetrischema lavernella (Chambers, 1874)

Synonyms
- Gelechia lavernella Chambers, 1874; Gelechia physalivorella Chambers, 1875

Species of moth

Symmetrischema lavernella is a moth in the family Gelechiidae. It was described by Vactor Tousey Chambers in 1874. It is found in North America, where it has been recorded Missouri, Texas, Illinois, Maine, Michigan, New Hampshire and the District of Columbia.

The forewings are gray, with the base of the costal margin dark brown, and from it a narrow, oblique, dark brown streak crosses the wing to the dorsal margin, in its course crossing almost at right angles an indistinct brown line which proceeds from a brown spot on the costal margin, and passes obliquely forwards nearly to the base of the wing. At the intersection of the lines, the brown spreads around them, forming another spot. These lines are irregular, and in some parts indistinct and behind the lines, the wing is densely dusted with fuscous to the tip.

The larvae feed on the flower buds and fruit of Physalis species.
