= Mary Murtfeldt =

American entomologist, botanist and botanical collector (1848–1913)

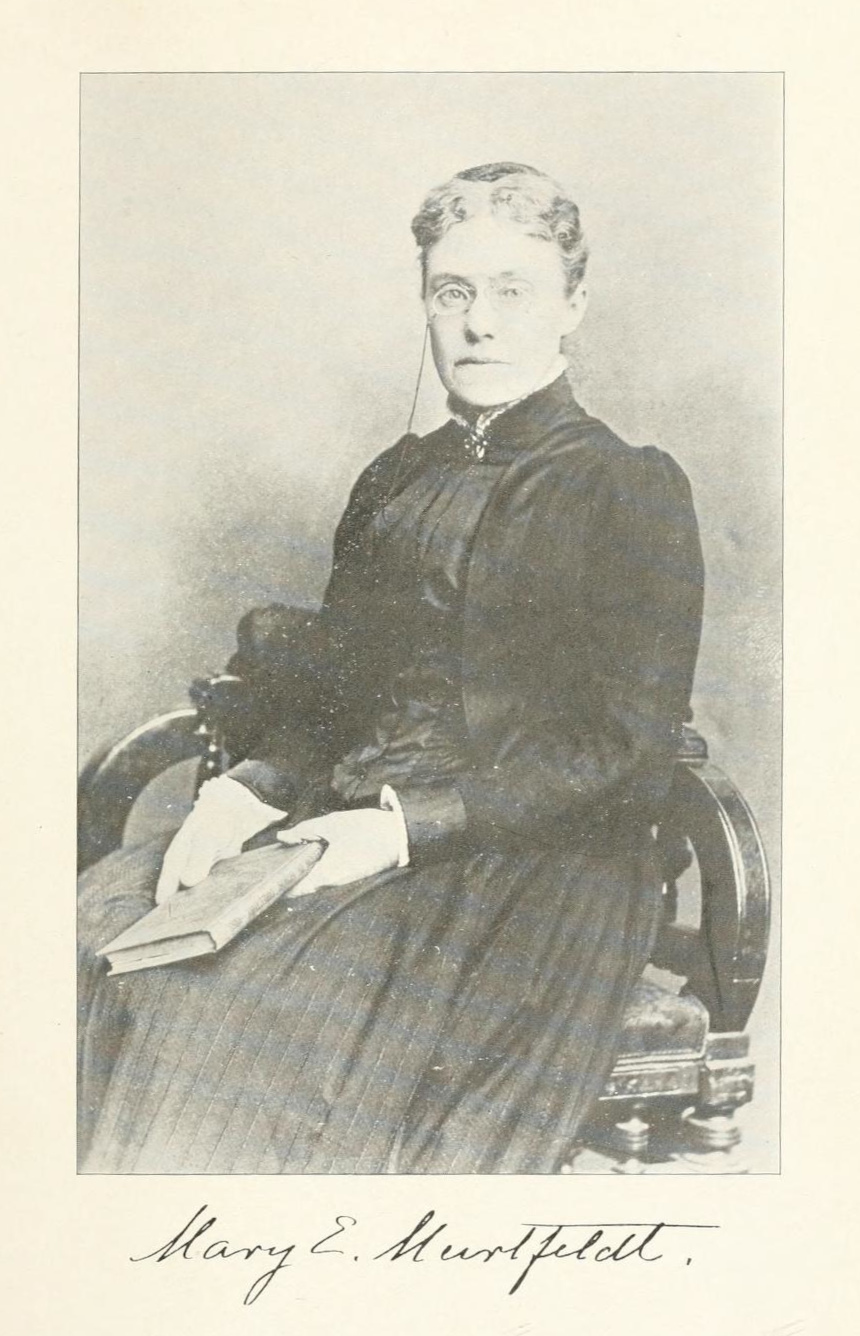
- Born: August 6, 1839; New York City
- Died: February 23, 1913 (aged 73)
- Alma mater: Rockford University
- Occupation: Entomologist, lepidopterist, editor, botanical collector
- Employer: United States Department of Agriculture
- Awards: Fellow of the American Association for the Advancement of Science

Mary Esther Murtfeldt (August 6, 1839, New York City – February 23, 1913, Kirkwood) was an American entomologist, botanist, botanical collector, writer and editor. She undertook research on the life histories of insects, describing several species new to science and wrote extensively on entomology. Murtfeldt created a collection of plant specimens that contributed to the scientific knowledge on the plants of Missouri.

== Life ==
Murtfeldt was born in New York City on August 6, 1839 to Esther and Charles W. Murtfeldt. She grew up in Rockford, Illinois but lived most of her adult life with her family in Kirkwood, Missouri. She was partially paralysed by polio in her youth and as a result her ability to walk was restricted. Murtfeldt was educated at home but went on to study at Rockford College from 1858 to 1860. She developed an interest in entomology and botany. This interest was encouraged by the then Missouri state entomologist Charles Valentine Riley who lived with the Murtfeldt family around 1870.

Murtfeldt began publishing scientific papers in 1872. She was employed as the assistant to the Missouri State entomologist from 1876 to 1877. Murtfeldt then became a field agent at the Bureau of Entomology of the U.S. Department of Agriculture. She served in that position from 1880—1893. From 1896 She was employed at the St Louis Republic, becoming the staff contributor in botany and entomology, and editing the journal Farm Progress.

During the 1870s Murtfeldt investigated the life histories of insects, particularly moths, and described several new species. The work was used by the Missouri State entomologist (Riley) in his much admired reports. She published a significant body of work including texts used to introduce farmers and horticulturalists to entomology as well as a text book on insects used to educate school children. She also worked at the interface between entomology and botany researching the pollination of the Yucca plant by moths. She created a significant collection of plant species from the St Louis, Missouri area. These specimens assisted Samuel Mills Tracy when writing his Flora of Missouri. Murtfeldt was a member of the Entomological Society of America.

Murtfeldt died at her home in Kirkwood on February 23, 1913.

Several species have been named in her honor, including Andricus murtfeldtae and Caloptilia murtfeldtella.

== Works ==
- 'New species of Tineidae', Canadian Entomologist 13 (1881). pp. 242–246.
- Outlines of entomology, 1891
- 'Report on Present Status of American Women in Entomology', Proceedings of the National Science Club, 3 (April 1897), pp. 11–14
- Stories of insect life : second series, summer and autumn, 1900
