= Lago de Oviedo =

- Laguna de Oviedo
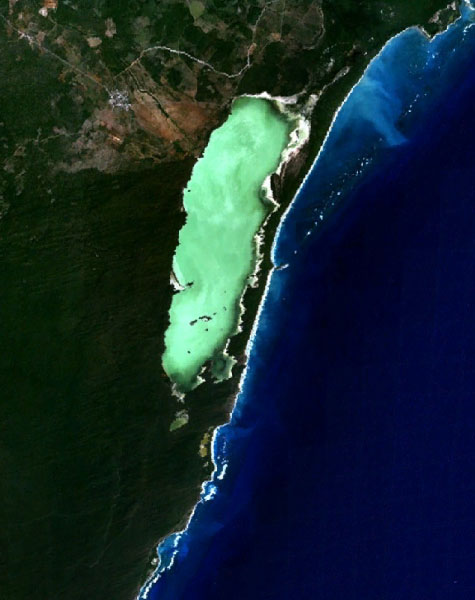

- Location within the Dominican Republic
- Location: Jaragua National Park, Pedernales Province
- Coordinates: 17.75915°N 71.366501°W
- Type: saltwater lake
- Basin countries: Dominican Republic

Lago de Oviedo, also known as Laguna de Oviedo, is a saltwater lake in Jaragua National Park, Pedernales Province, Dominican Republic.

== Size ==
It is approximately 25 km^{2} in area, making it the second largest body of water in the Dominican Republic after Lake Enriquillo.

== Geology ==
Although receiving freshwater from the Bahoruco Mountain Range, the lake is hypersaline due to sea water flowing into the lake through an underground system caused by a karstic depression. Salinity levels show seasonal changes due to precipitation, evaporation and the amount of freshwater input. One of the most notable aspects of the lake is the greenish aspect of its water, caused by limestone sediments being dragged into the lake by the underground water flow.

== Ecology ==
Its unique flora and fauna are perhaps its most interesting feature; in mangroves, American flamingos, rhinoceros iguanas, and various species of endemic birds and several cays inside the lake can be found.
