= Argyrotaenia felisana =

Scientific classification
- Kingdom: Animalia
- Phylum: Arthropoda
- Clade: Pancrustacea
- Class: Insecta
- Order: Lepidoptera
- Family: Tortricidae
- Genus: Argyrotaenia
- Species: A. felisana

Binomial name
- Argyrotaenia felisana Razowski, 1999

Species of moth

Argyrotaenia felisana is a species of moth of the family Tortricidae. Adults of the species have a forewing length of 6.0–8.0 mm (0.24–0.31 in) and a wingspan of 18 mm (0.71 in). It is endemic to the Dominican Republic, where it is found on every large mountain range except for the Baoruco Mountain Range in Pedernales Province. It is an inhabitant of cloud forests, broadleaf forests, pine forests, secondary forests, and grasslands at elevations of 860–1,880 m (3,000–6,000 ft).

== Taxonomy ==
Argyrotaenia felisana was formally described by the Polish entomologist Józef Razowski in 1999 based on a male collected from the Sierra de Nebia mountain range in Independencia Province, Dominican Republic.

== Description ==
Argyrotaenia felisana has an appearance that is fairly typical for members of its genus. Adults of the species have a forewing length of 6.0–8.0 mm (0.24–0.31 in) and a wingspan of 18 mm (0.71 in). The head is generally fuscous in color.

Argyrotaenia felisana is extremely similar to A. bisignata in its appearance and can only reliably be distinguished from that species by the appearance of its male genitalia and its range. Females can only be differentiated by their range or by the presence of conspecific males.

== Distribution and habitat ==
Argyrotaenia felisana has to-date only been recorded from the Dominican Republic, where it is wide-ranging, being found on every large mountain range except for the Baoruco Mountain Range in Pedernales Province. It is known from the provinces of Azua, Barahona, Elías Piña, Independencia, La Vega, Monseñor Nouel, Peravia, and Puerto Plata. The moth inhabits cloud forests, broadleaf forests, pine forests, secondary forests, and grasslands at elevations of 860–1,880 m (3,000–6,000 ft), but its ecology is otherwise poorly known.
