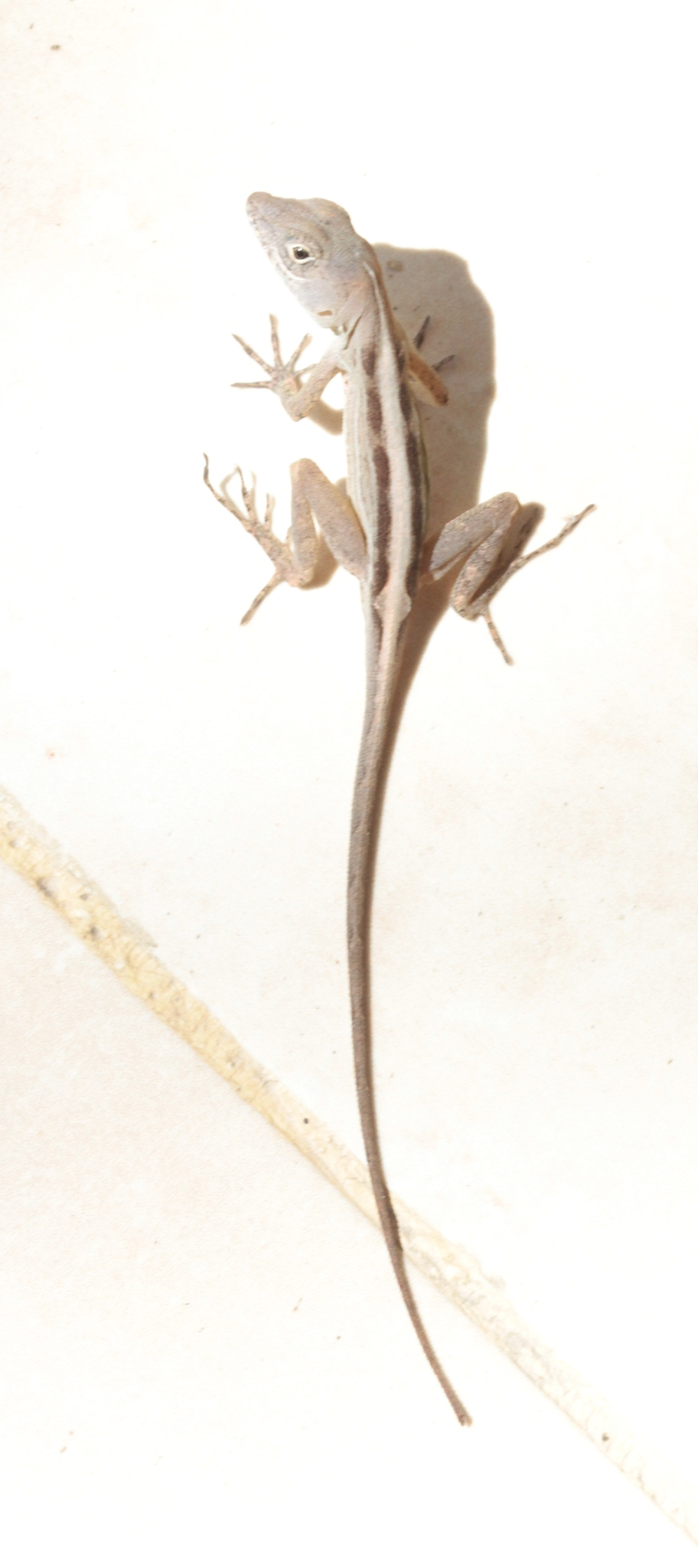

Scientific classification
- Kingdom: Animalia
- Phylum: Chordata
- Class: Reptilia
- Order: Squamata
- Suborder: Iguania
- Family: Dactyloidae
- Genus: Anolis
- Species: A. australis

Binomial name
- Anolis australis (Köhler, Zimmer, McGrath, & Hedges, 2019)

Synonyms
- Audantia australis Köhler et al., 2019

= Anolis australis =

Species of lizard

Anolis australis, the southern stout anole, is a species of lizard in the family Dactyloidae. Males grow to 69 mm (2.7 in) and females to 64 mm (2.5 in) in snout–vent length. Males have dirty-white dewlaps with a yellow or orange hue and regularly-arranged gorgetals, smaller in size towards the center of the dewlap. It is endemic to southern Hispaniola, where it is found on the Tiburón Peninsula of Haiti and nearby localities south of the Baoruco Mountain Range in the Dominican Republic. It inhabits a variety of habitats at elevations of up to 1,630 m (5,350 ft).

== Taxonomy ==
Anolis australis was formally described in 2019 as Audantia australis based on a specimen from near Aceitillar in the Pedernales Province of the Dominican Republic. The specific epithet is derived after the Latin word meaning "southern", alluding to, in the words of the authors, "[its] distribution[...]on the southern paleo-island of Hispaniola". It has the common name southern stout anole.

Specimens of Anolis australis were historically considered to represent Anolis cybotes. A. australis is most closely related to A. cybotes, with the clade formed by these two species being further sister to A. aridius. The extremely large genus Anolis is sometimes split into several smaller genera; under this arrangement, Anolis australis is placed in the genus Audantia, a group of more than a dozen species endemic to Hispaniola.

== Description ==
Males of the species grow to a snout–vent length of 69 mm (2.7 in) and females to 64 mm (2.5 in). Males have dirty-white dewlaps with a yellow or orange hue and regularly-arranged gorgetals, smaller in size towards the center of the dewlap. They also have dark stripes on the throat.

== Distribution and ecology ==
Anolis australis is endemic to Hispaniola, a large Caribbean island in the Greater Antilles that is politically split between the Dominican Republic and Haiti. A. australis is restricted to the south of the island, with a range in the medial and eastern Tiburón Peninsula, as well as nearby localities south of the Baoruco Mountain Range in the DR. The anole lives in a variety of habitats, such as secondary growth, at elevations of up to 1,630 m (5,350 ft). These anoles can be seen sleeping on vegetation up to meter high at night.

Anolis australis has not been evaluated by the IUCN, but the authors who described the species recommended it be classified as being of least concern due to its sufficiently large range and tolerance of disturbed habitat.
