= Baoruco =

Baoruco (or Bahoruco) may refer to:

- Baoruco Province, in the Dominican Republic
- Baoruco Mountain Range with Sierra de Bahoruco National Park
- Bahoruco River
