= Hispaniola racer =

Conservation status
- Vulnerable (IUCN 3.1)

Scientific classification
- Kingdom: Animalia
- Phylum: Chordata
- Class: Reptilia
- Order: Squamata
- Suborder: Serpentes
- Family: Colubridae
- Genus: Haitiophis; Hedges & Vidal, 2009
- Species: H. anomalus

Binomial name
- Haitiophis anomalus (Peters, 1863)

Synonyms
- Zamenis anomalus; Dromicus anomalus; Alsophis anomalus; Ocyophis anomalus; Caraiba anomala

Snake species endemic to Hispaniola

The Hispaniola racer or Hispaniolan brown racer (Haitiophis anomalus) is a snake that is endemic to the Caribbean island of Hispaniola (split between the Dominican Republic and Haiti). It is monotypic in the genus Haitiophis.

== Description ==
At an average length of 2 meters (6 ft 7 in), H. anomalus is the largest colubrid snake in the Americas, and the longest snake species in the West Indies. True to its name, it is brown in coloration, with a pale yellow underbelly.

=== Behavior ===
When cornered, individuals may produce a hood and rear up, similar to many Old World cobras. The species may also strike; however, it is mildly venomous.

== Diet ==
H. anomalus has a varied diet. Frogs and lizards (particularly Anolis species) are the most common prey item; however, individuals have also been recorded to prey on smooth-billed ani (Crotophaga ani), house mouse (Mus musculus) and native boas (Chilabothrus sp.). Pursuits of juvenile rhinoceros iguanas (Cyclura cornuta) and rats (Rattus sp.) have also been recorded. While hunting, it has been recorded to wait at the exit hole of iguana burrows.

== Distribution and habitat ==
The historic range of H. anomalus believed to be island-wide; however, its range has heavily contracted over time. The majority of the racer's range lies in the Dominican Republic, where it is found in the southwest of the country (in the arid areas surrounding Lake Enriquillo, Pedernales Province, and Isla Beata) as well as a relict population in Monte Cristi Province. In Haiti, the racer is only known to exist on Tortuga. The Hispaniola racer is primarily found in xeric open-thorn forest, as well as transitional areas into oases and river valleys.

== Threats ==
Agricultural expansion, deforestation for charcoal production (especially in Haiti), and predation from invasive species, such as feral cats (Felis catus) and small Indian mongooses (Urva auropunctata) are all factors that have resulted in the range and population reduction of H. anomalus. Predation from the native red-tailed hawk (Buteo jamaicensis) is inferred, but has not been recorded.
