= Sierra de Bahoruco National Park =

National park in the Dominican Republic

- IUCN category II (national park)
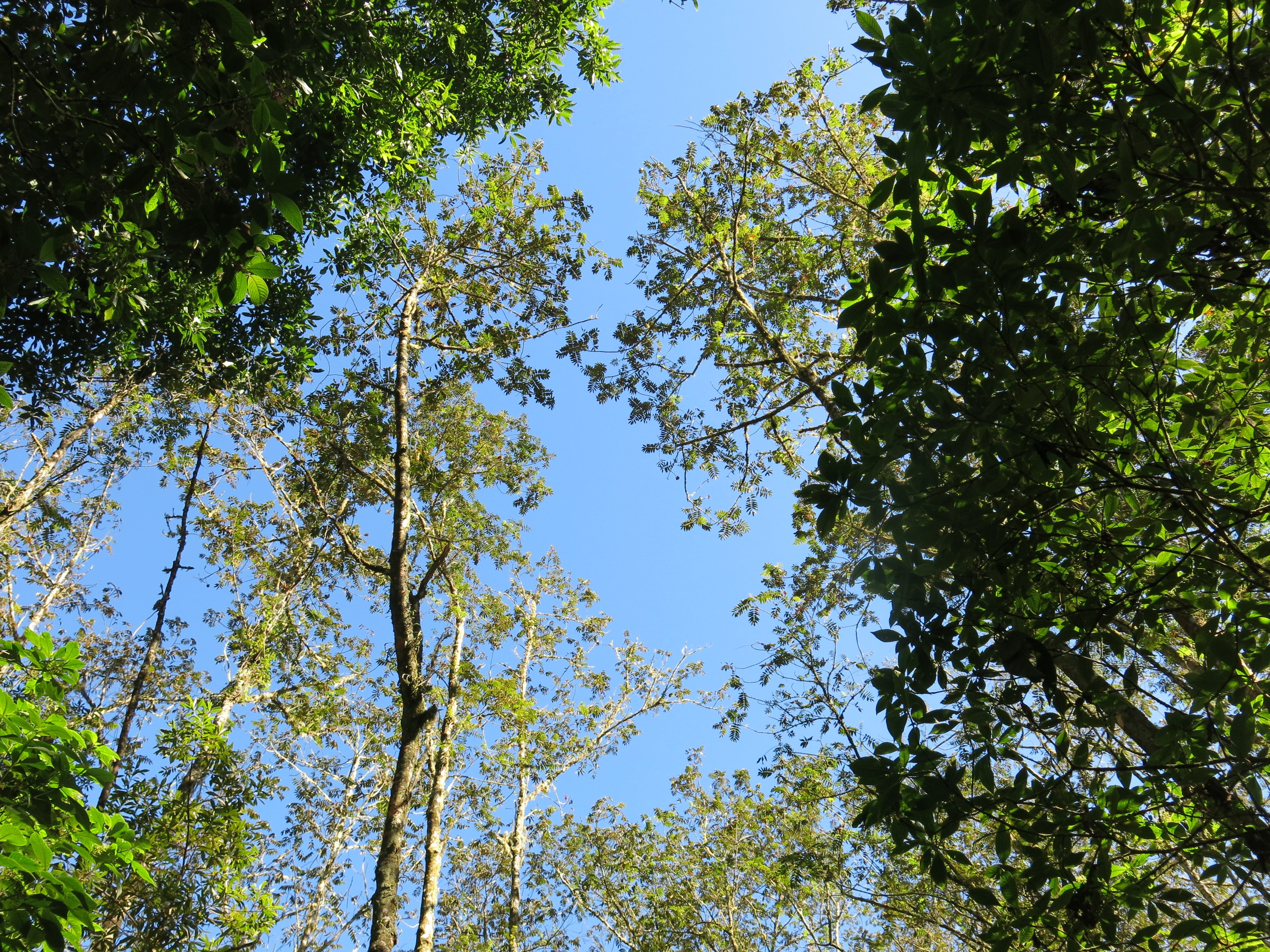
- A stand of Brunellia trees in the park

- Location within the Dominican Republic
- Interactive map of Sierra de Bahoruco National Park
- Location: Pedernales Province, Independencia Province and Barahona Province in Dominican Republic
- Coordinates: 18.16°N 71.5°W
- Area: 278,240 acres (1,126.0 km^{2})
- Established: 1983

The Sierra de Bahoruco National Park is an environmentally protected national park located in the South-western region of Dominican Republic. It was created in 1983 by Presidential Decree (No. 1315/83) during the presidency of Salvador Jorge Blanco.

== Geography ==
The park is bordered by Lake Enriquillo and Jaragua National Park. Together with the two parks, it constitutes the Jaragua-Bahoruco-Enriquillo biosphere reserve, created on November 6, 2002.

The park is located within the provinces of Pedernales Province, Independencia Province and Barahona Province and borders Haiti. It has an area of approximately 1126 km^{2}. Part of the park includes the Bahoruco Mountain Range.

Also located South-west of the Bahoruco Peninsula is Bahía de las Águilas (Bay of Eagle's), a bay which stretches out 8.5 km in length, 5.4 km of which constitutes beach area in its central region, and is a highly protected part of the Biosphere-reserve for its concentration of endemic and endangered species like The Hispaniolan Solenodon, The Hutia (Hutia Conga), and Rhino Iguanas.

== Climate ==
There are a variety of biomes in the park, ranging from tropical and subtropical dry broadleaf forests at sea level, to temperate rainforest in the center of the park. In the mountains, the average temperature is 18 °C, and the average annual rainfall is between 1000mm and 2500mm.

== Geology ==
The geological formation of the Bahoruco Mountain Range rests atop sedimentary limestone and marl-stone from the Eocene and Pliocene eras, which contain various species of algae, and is at its base supported by volcanic rock from the caribbean plateau.

Sierra de Bahoruco is home to one of the most emblematic sites on the Bahoruco Peninsula, El Hoyo del Pelempito (Pelempito's Hole), located 361 meters below sea level, Pelempito is the product of a collapsing of cave systems below its surface millions of years ago, due to pressure from underlying tectonic plates.

El Hoyo del Pelempito has a width of 2.5 kilometers and length of 7 kilometers, forming a triangular shaped depression with an oscillating temperature of 15 to 25 degrees Celsius, while the surrounding border mountains can reach up to and surpass 1,800 meters in height.

== Vegetation and fauna ==
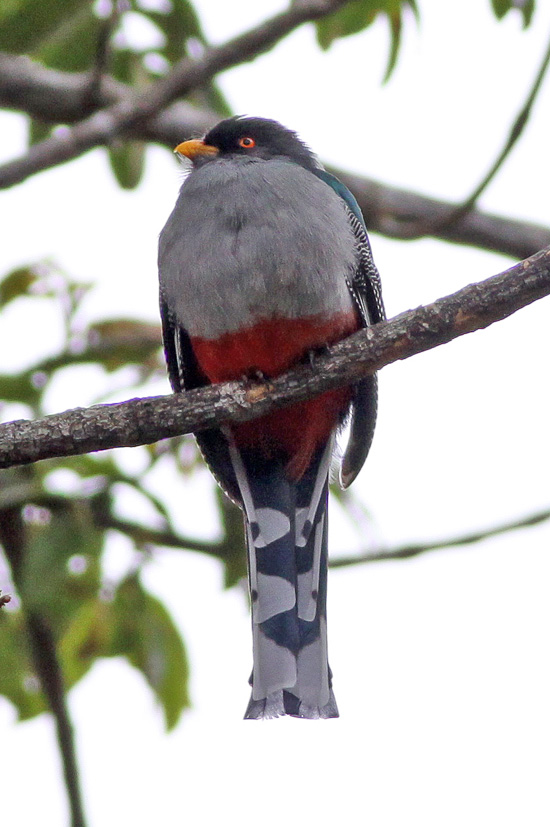
Hispaniolan trogon

The park contains vast areas of pine forest and large broad-leaved trees, mixed forest and a wide variety of orchids.

There are 32 species of endemic birds that inhabit the island, of which 30 can be found in the park. The park is home to several threatened species, including bay-breasted cuckoos, Hispaniolan amazons, the least poorwill, white-necked crows, western chat-tanagers and La Selle thrushes. The park also has populations of Stygian owls and sharp-shinned hawks.
