= Jaragua National Park =

National park in the Dominican Republic

- Parque Nacional Jaragua
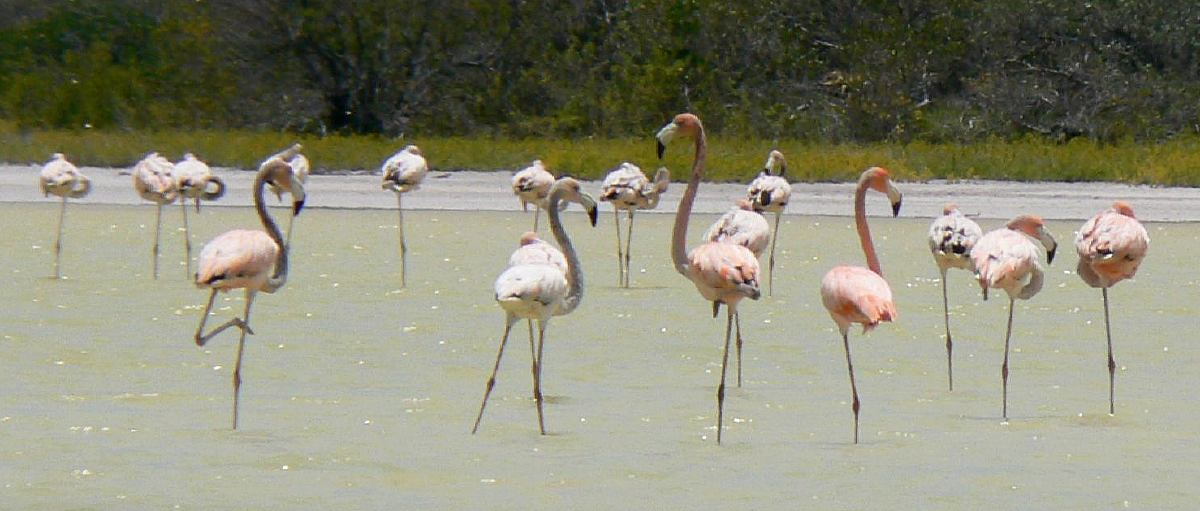
- A flock of American flamingos (Phoenicopterus ruber)

- Location within the Dominican Republic
- Interactive map of Jaragua National Park
- Location: Pedernales Province, Dominican Republic
- Nearest city: Pedernales
- Coordinates: 17.789228°N 71.499023°W
- Area: 1,374 km^{2} (531 sq mi)
- Designation: National Park
- Established: August 11, 1983

Jaragua National Park (Spanish: Parque Nacional Jaragua) is a Dominican national park located in Pedernales Province, in the extreme southwest of the Dominican Republic. Jaragua has a total area of 1,374 km^{2} (905 km^{2} of which are offshore marine habitats), the largest such protected area in the Caribbean.

It has part of the Man and the Biosphere Programme.

== Geography and ecology ==
Jaragua National Park, named after the Taíno chiefdom of Xaragua, was established by Presidential Decree No. 1315 on August 11, 1983, to protect the Dominican Republic's Hispaniolan dry forests ecoregion and its endemic species. Spanning the southern slopes of the Baoruco Mountain Range, from Oviedo to Cabo Rojo, Jaragua National Park includes dry forest, coastal mangroves and scrub, as well as dry, terrestrial areas inland and protected offshore marine habitats.

Beata Island (Isla Beata), Alto Velo Island and Bahía de las Águilas (Eagle Bay) are part of the park, as well as Lago de Oviedo, a saltwater lake ecosystem known for its diverse avifauna. Birds seen in the area include many migratory and breeding waterfowl, wading and passerine species common to the Americas, as well as psittaciformes (parrots), hummingbirds and several birds of prey. Endemic avian species include the Greater Antillean bullfinch (Melopyrrha violacea), American flamingo (Phoenicopterus ruber), Antillean piculet (Nesoctites micromegas), Greater Antillean grackle (Quiscalus niger), Hispaniolan emerald (Riccordia swainsonii), Hispaniolan mango (Anthracothorax dominicus), Abbott's northern potoo (Nyctibius jamaicensis abbottii), vervain hummingbird (Mellisuga minima) and the Hispaniolan parrot (Amazona ventralis), among many others.

Among the variety of habitats found within the bounds of Jaragua are the numerous lagoons, such as Lagunas Oviedo, Salada, Manuel Matos, La Rabiza, Puerto en Medio, Bucán Base, and Salado Bucán.

Jaragua is the only protected area of the Paleoisla del Sur geoformation, one of two land masses to form from the foundation of Hispaniola between 20,000 and 30,000 B.C. The park has been designated an Important Bird Area (IBA) by BirdLife International.

== Sources ==
- Cohen, Saul B. (ed). "Parque Nacional Jaragua." Columbia Gazetteer of North America. New York: Columbia, 2002.
- "Jaragua National Park, Dominican Republic." The Nature Conservancy.
- "Jaragua National Park." UNESCO.
