= Cabo Beata =

Southernmost point of Hispaniola, in the Dominican Republic

Coordinates: 17°36′N 71°25′W

Cabo Beata is the southernmost point of the island of Hispaniola, in the Pedernales Province of the Dominican Republic. The small island of Isla Beata stands about 4 mi (7 km) southwest of the cape.
