= Juancho =

- Location of Pedernales in the Dominican Republic
- Coordinates: 17°52′12″N 71°16′48″W
- Country: Dominican Republic
- Province: Pedernales

Population (2002)
  - Total: 3,426
  - Urban: 1,554
- Climate: Aw

Juancho is a town in the Pedernales Province of the Dominican Republic. It is a municipal district of the municipality of Pedernales.

== Sources ==
- – World-Gazetteer.com
