= Cabo Rojo, Dominican Republic =

Cape and beach in the Dominican Republic

Coordinates: 17°54′N 71°40′W

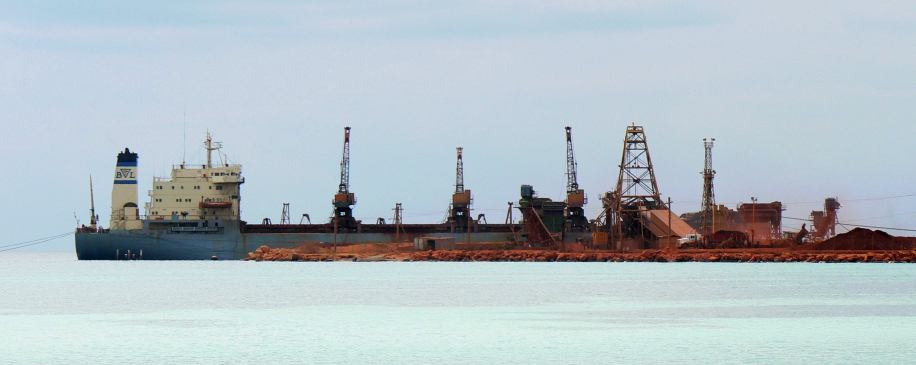
Bauxite being loaded at Cabo Rojo, Dominican Republic, to be shipped elsewhere for processing; 2007

Literally meaning "Red Cape", is both a cape on the southwestern coast of the Dominican Republic, and a beach on the same location. More specifically, it belongs to Pedernales in Pedernales Province, the southernmost province of the country.

This part of the country is known for its bauxite mines and its beautiful beaches like Bahía de las Águilas and Cabo Rojo. The area is being rapidly changed as a major cruise ship port opened here in 2024.
