= Oviedo, Dominican Republic =

Oviedo
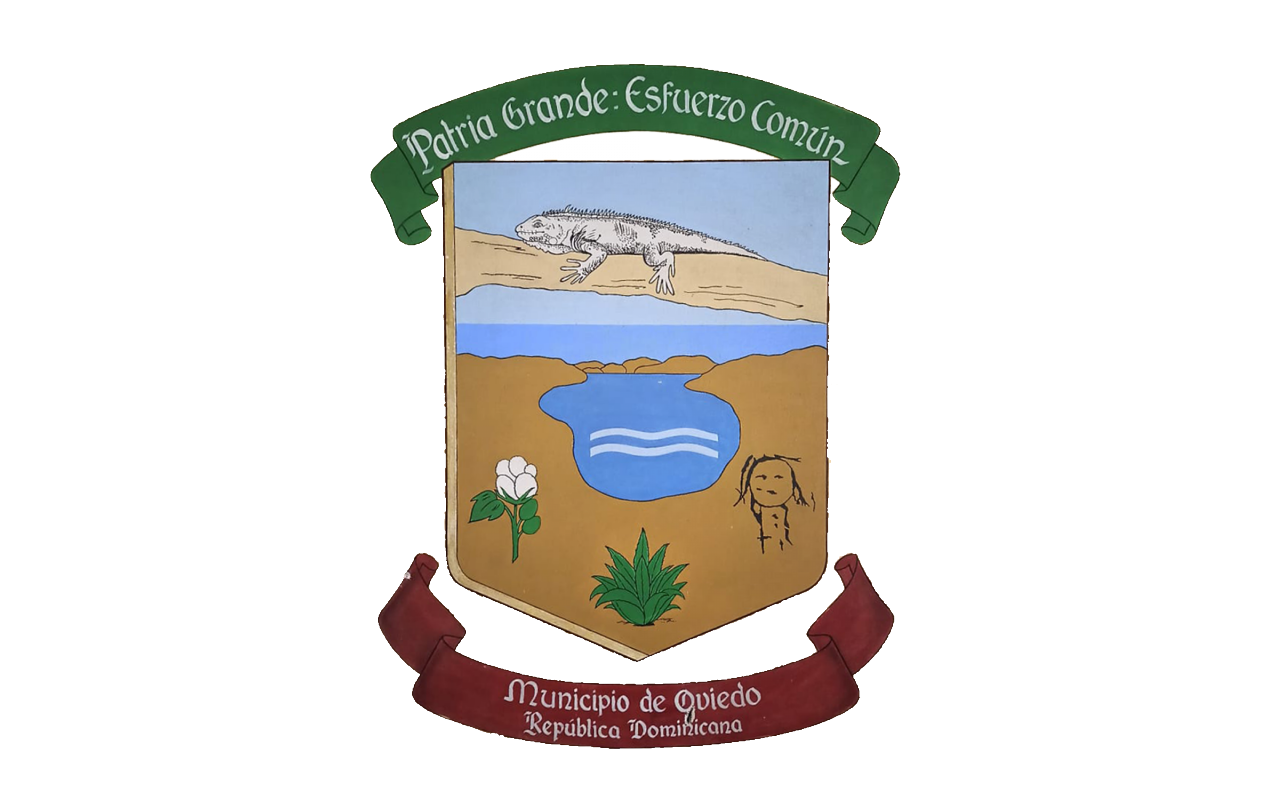
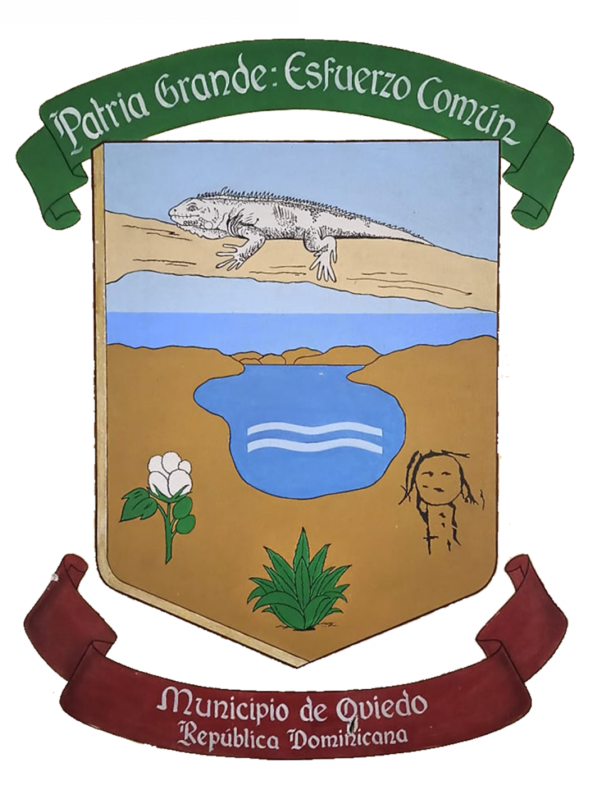
- Flag Coat of arms

- Location of Oviedo in the Dominican Republic
- Coordinates: 17°46′48″N 71°22′12″W
- Country: Dominican Republic
- Province: Pedernales
- Municipality since: 1957

Area
  - Total: 799.86 km^{2} (308.83 sq mi)

Population (2012)
  - Total: 10,986
  - Density: 13.735/km^{2} (35.573/sq mi)
- Distance to – Pedernales: 60 km
- Municipal Districts: 0
- Climate: Aw

Oviedo is a city and municipality in the Pedernales province of the Dominican Republic. It is the southernmost city of the Dominican Republic and Hispaniola.

== Climate ==
Climate data for Oviedo, Dominican Republic (1961–1990)
Month	Jan	Feb	Mar	Apr	May	Jun	Jul	Aug	Sep	Oct	Nov	Dec	Year
Record high °C (°F)	33.0 (91.4)	33.2 (91.8)	35.5 (95.9)	34.5 (94.1)	35.6 (96.1)	36.3 (97.3)	38.0 (100.4)	38.0 (100.4)	36.2 (97.2)	35.3 (95.5)	35.0 (95.0)	33.0 (91.4)	38.0 (100.4)
Mean daily maximum °C (°F)	28.9 (84.0)	29.1 (84.4)	29.8 (85.6)	30.2 (86.4)	30.7 (87.3)	31.0 (87.8)	31.6 (88.9)	32.2 (90.0)	31.8 (89.2)	31.0 (87.8)	30.0 (86.0)	28.9 (84.0)	30.4 (86.7)
Mean daily minimum °C (°F)	19.3 (66.7)	19.7 (67.5)	20.9 (69.6)	21.7 (71.1)	22.4 (72.3)	23.2 (73.8)	24.0 (75.2)	24.0 (75.2)	23.3 (73.9)	22.2 (72.0)	20.9 (69.6)	19.5 (67.1)	21.8 (71.2)
Record low °C (°F)	13.8 (56.8)	15.0 (59.0)	16.0 (60.8)	16.9 (62.4)	15.0 (59.0)	19.0 (66.2)	19.0 (66.2)	17.4 (63.3)	16.0 (60.8)	17.3 (63.1)	16.0 (60.8)	15.5 (59.9)	13.8 (56.8)
Average rainfall mm (inches)	33.3 (1.31)	24.0 (0.94)	22.6 (0.89)	32.9 (1.30)	95.8 (3.77)	95.0 (3.74)	66.0 (2.60)	98.7 (3.89)	161.5 (6.36)	113.3 (4.46)	58.8 (2.31)	30.3 (1.19)	832.2 (32.76)
Average rainy days (≥ 1.0 mm)	3.5	3.1	2.7	3.7	6.6	7.7	4.6	5.6	7.3	8.1	4.7	3.2	60.8
Source: NOAA

== Sources ==
- – World-Gazetteer.com
