= Bahía de las Águilas =

- Beach
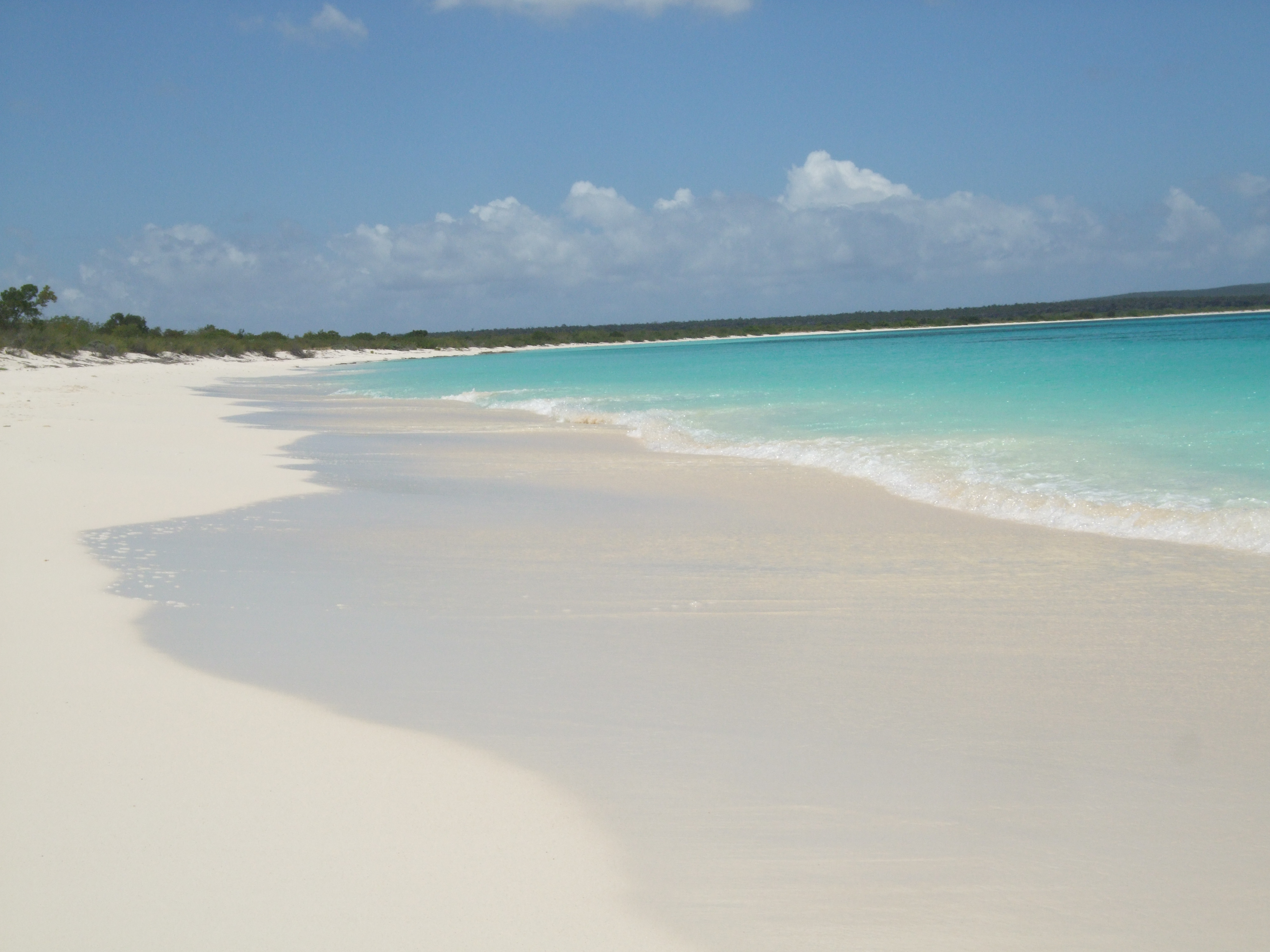
- Bahía de las Águilas, Dominican Republic

- Location within the Dominican Republic
- Coordinates: 17°51′43″N 71°38′44″W
- Country: Dominican Republic
- Activities: Swimming Diving

Bahía de las Águilas (Spanish: [baˈia ðe las ˈaɣilas]; literally "Eagles’ Bay"), is an 8 km-long (5 mi) beach along the southwestern coast of the Dominican Republic in the province of Pedernales near the southernmost part of the land border with Haiti. The bay is part of the Jaragua National Park, and it is considered one of the most crystalline beaches in the world, according to some travel opinion writers. The bay is a protected area as is the surrounding park; hence there is an abundance of sea life a few steps off the beach within its waters.

== Geography ==
The beach is utterly isolated. 323 km from Santo Domingo and approximately 25 km from Pedernales (the nearest town), this beach stands out in the middle of the deserted steppe of the park. Departing from Pedernales, one reaches a small village called "La Cueva" ("The Cave") so named because of the numerous caves surrounding the village, which up until 2007, were occupied by local fishermen. La Cueva is located on a tip of land called Cabo Rojo (Red Cape/Point). Here one of the local villagers can be hired to take visitors to the beach bordering the coast on a small motorboat, on foot or with an all-wheel-drive vehicle.

== Territory ==
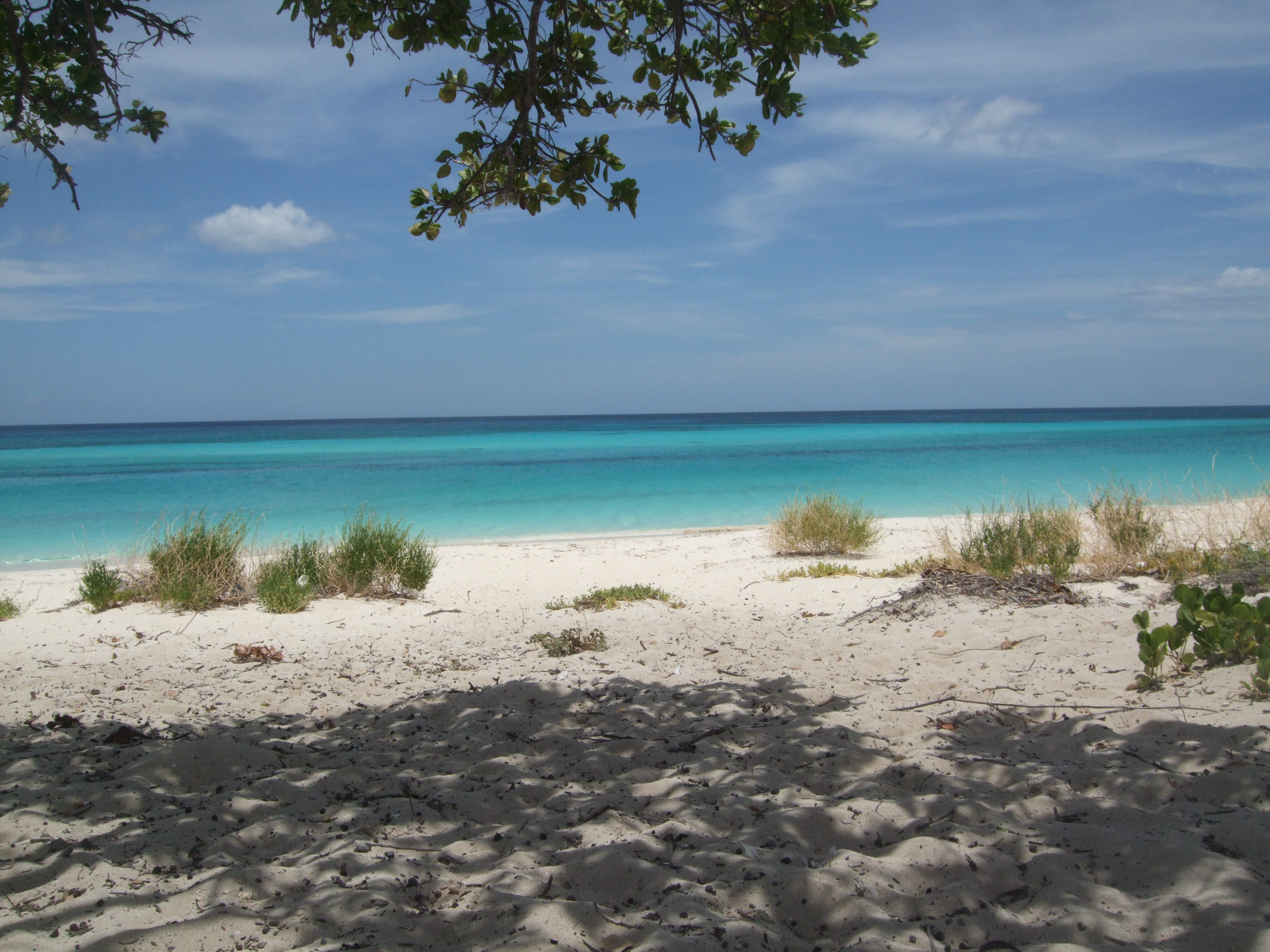

There was a legal process that began in 1997 as the territories on which Bahía de las Águilas is located were supposed to be "acquired" by persons with political connections. That generated a lot of reactions from civil society as these acquisitions were attributed to corrupt practices. Justice did prevail, and Bahía de las Águilas was declared public land and is now a part of a widescale plan for development by the Dominican Republic government.

Although Bahía de las Águilas has caught the eye of major international hotel and resort chains like Marriott Group, which has 10 facilities throughout the Dominican Republic and 13 additional projects underway, President Luis Abinader has stated that no construction of any kind will be taking place in zones which are under environmental protection.

== Flora and fauna ==
Given Bahía de las Águilas's location within the Jaragua National Park, its coasts offer a subtropical climate and semi-arid terrain of bushes and shrubs to a range of diverse flora such as canelillas, raft trees, balsa palms, and even horned melon fruits.

Among its most notable and endemic mammals are the pre-historic Hispaniolan Solenodons (Solenodon paradoxus), and the Hutia (Hutia conga), both endangered species, along with the likes of reptiles and amphibians: ricord iguanas, rhinoceros iguanas, and Hispaniolan sliders.

There are also numerous bird species flying in the area like sooty terns, plain and white-crowned pigeons being the most abundant.

== Marine ecosystem ==
The Bahía de las Águilas Caribbean sea floor is composed largely of uncontaminated coral reefs, and abundant sea grass prairies which serve as a key source of nutrients for legions of queen conch, Panulirus argus (spiny lobster), and even larger species like the Antillean manatee.

Seeking refuge in its waters, endangered species of hawksbill turtles, leatherbacks and green sea turtles rely on areas like Bahía de las Águilas to reproduce and live free of poaching.

== Views ==
Photographs of Bahía de las Águilas reveal it to be quite remote and largely devoid of people.

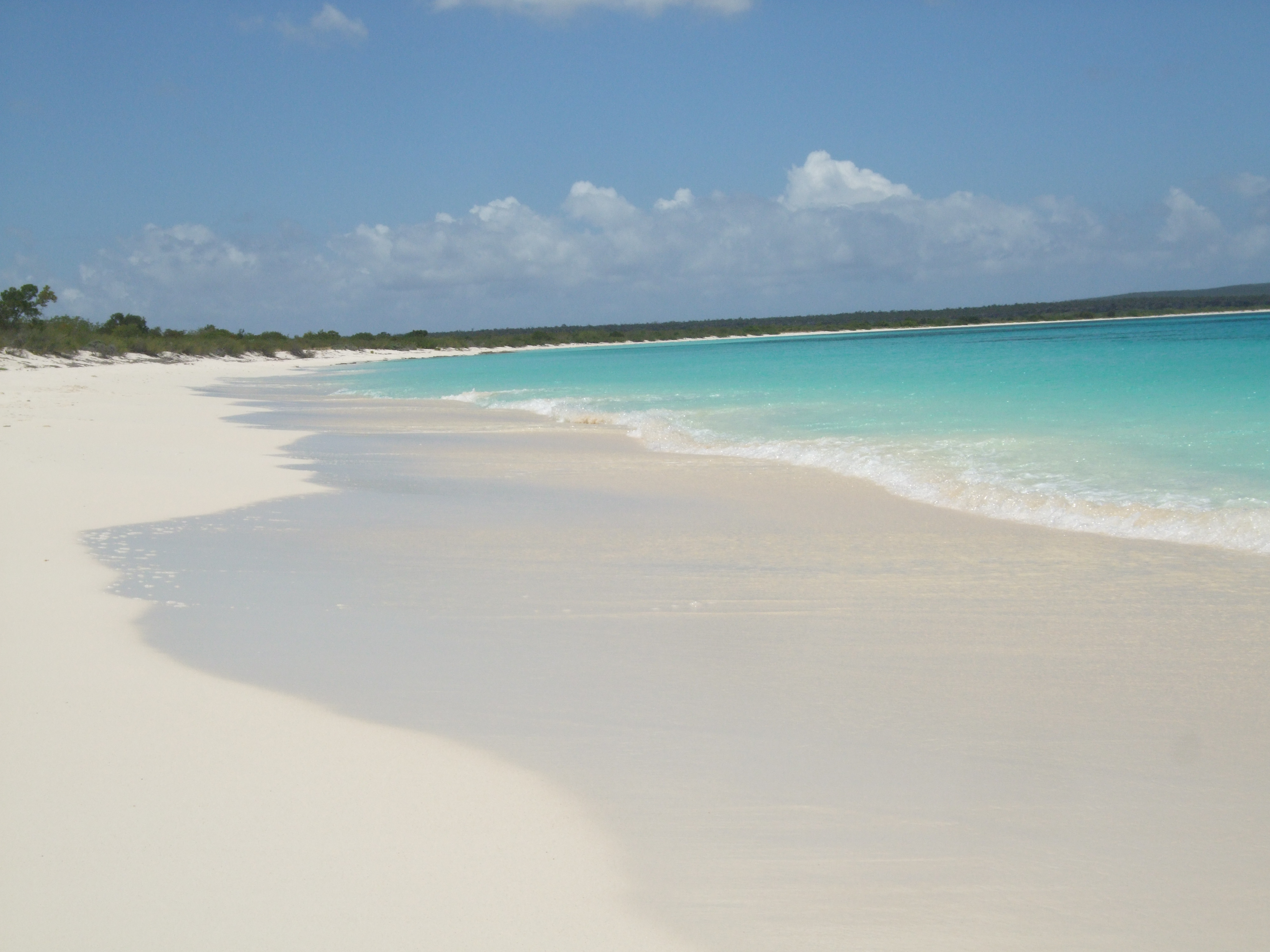

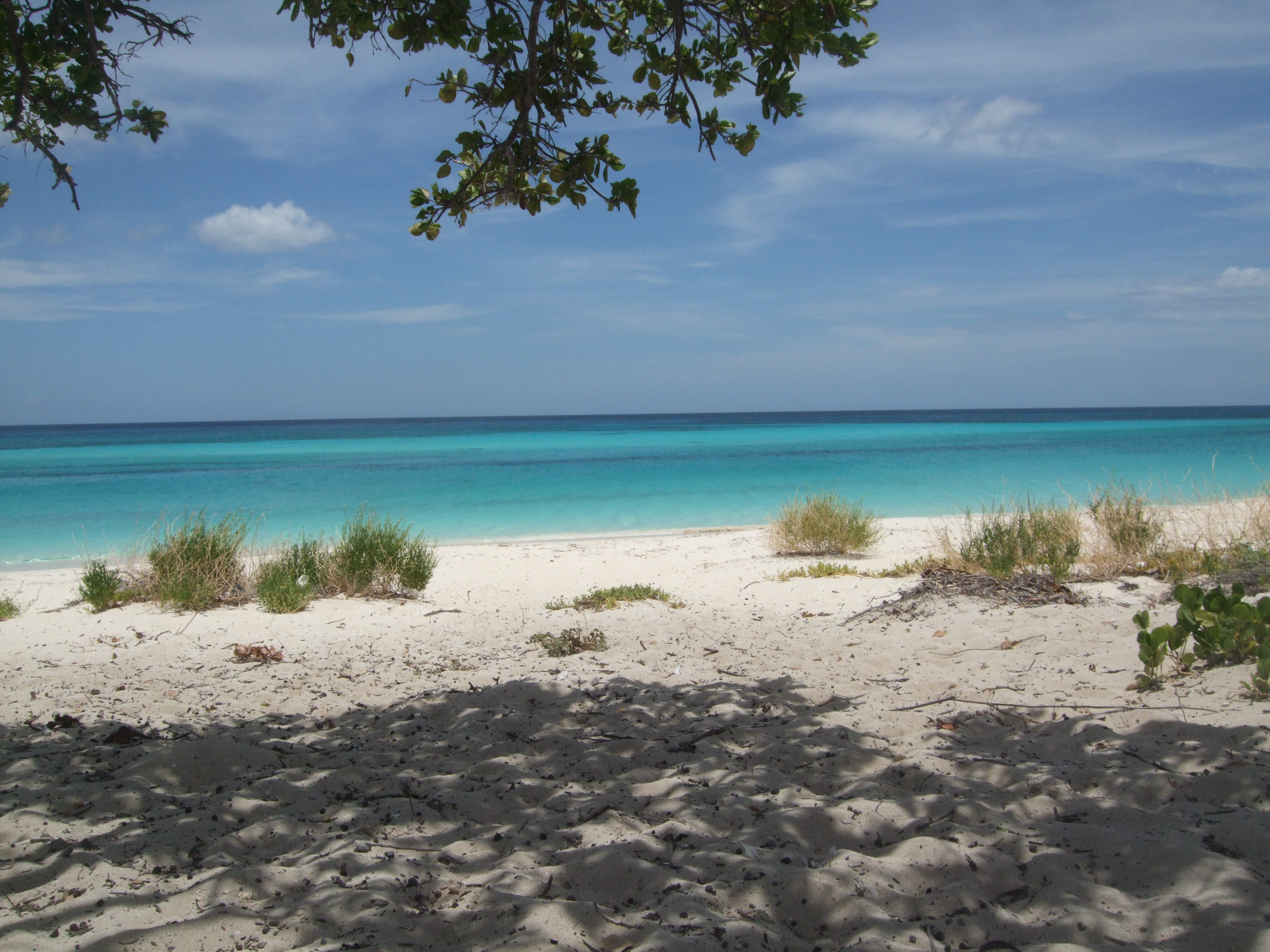

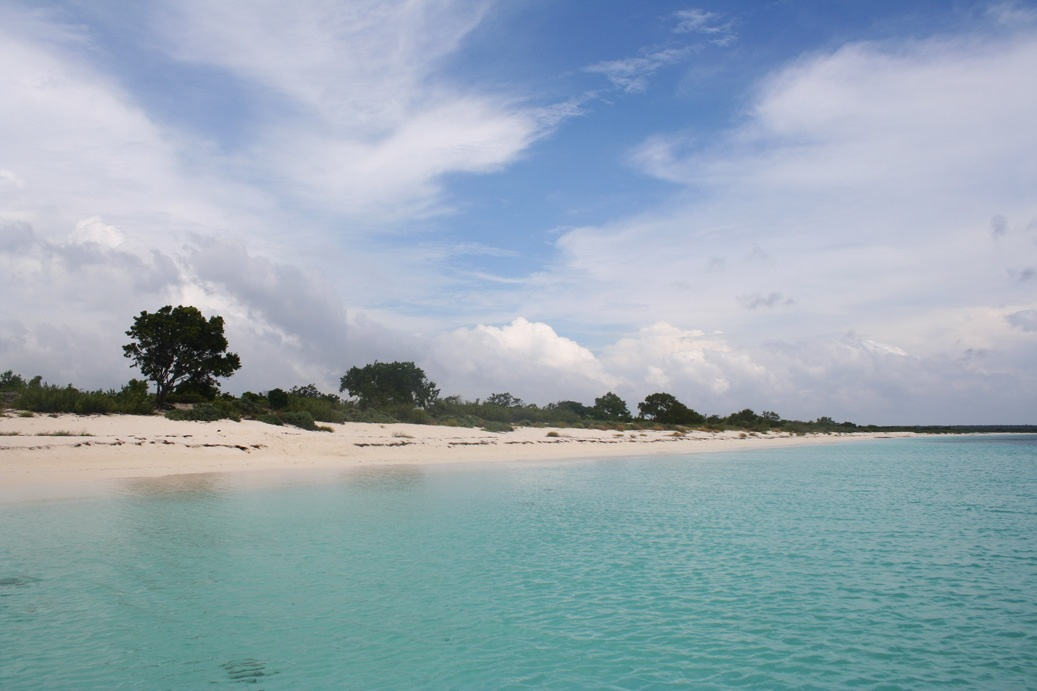

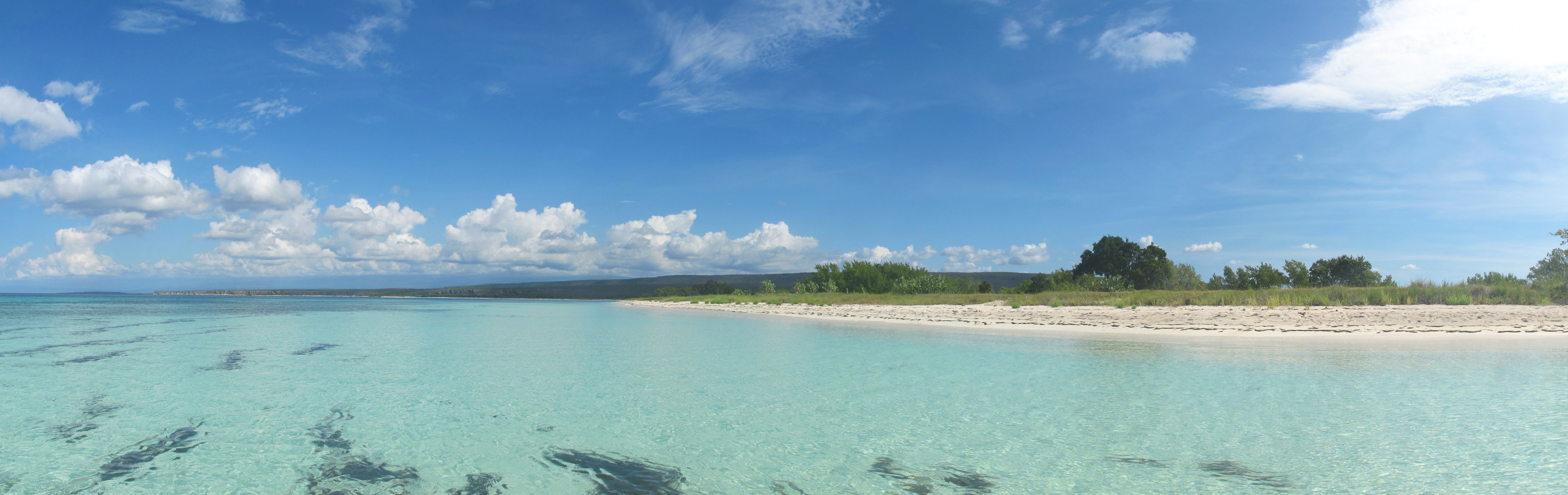

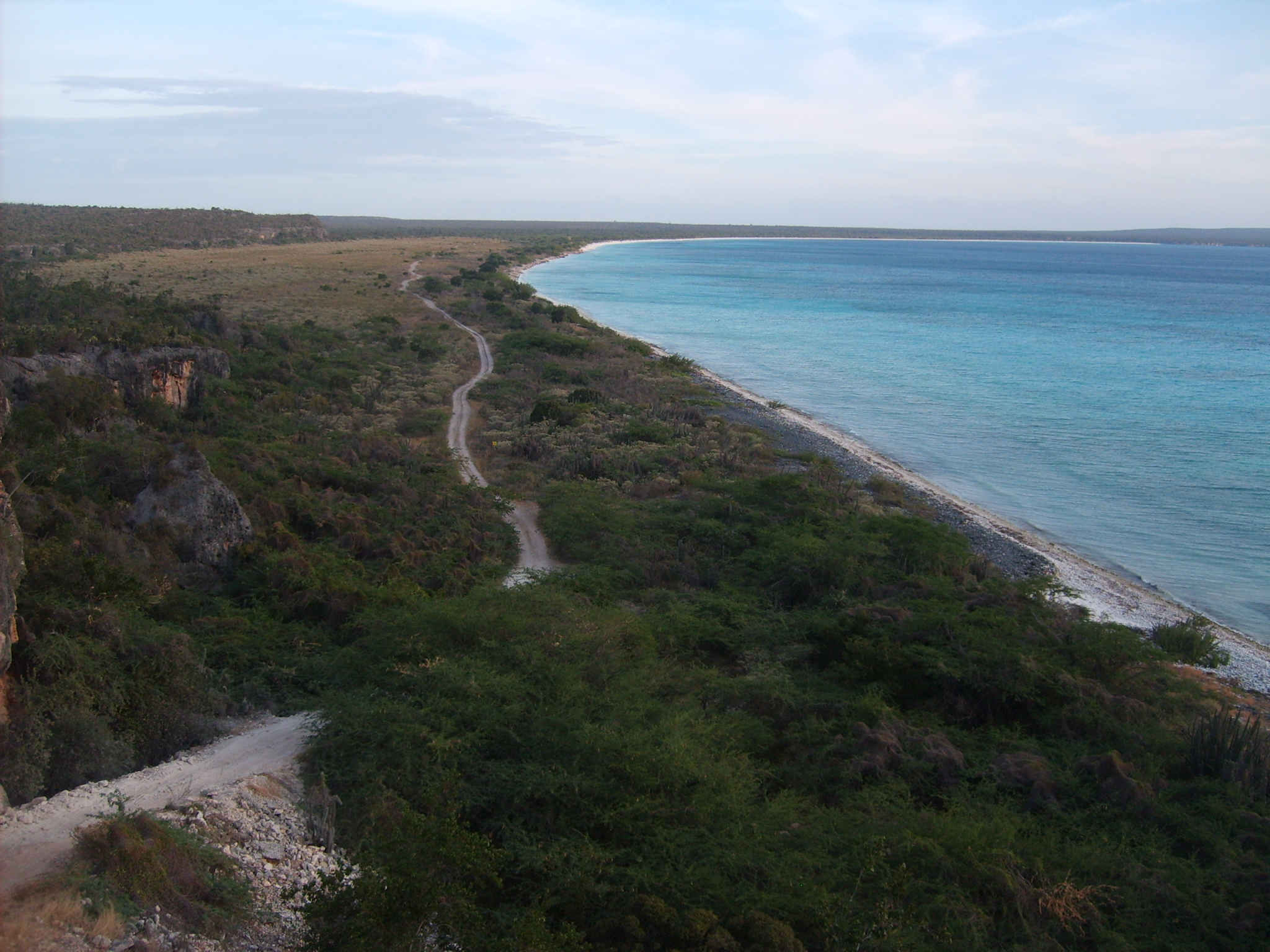

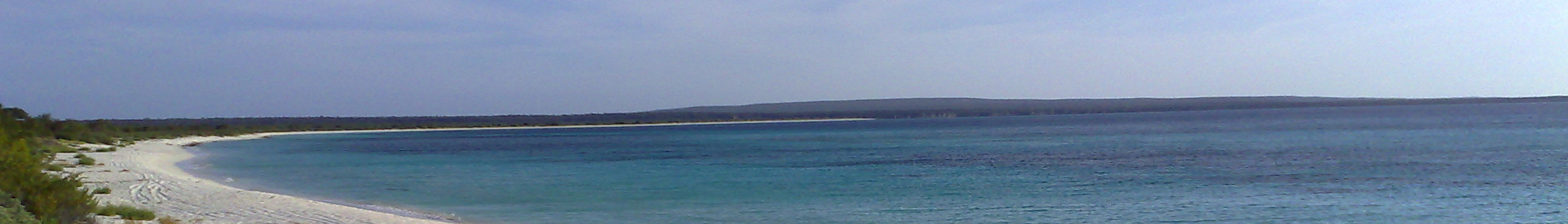
