= Cyclura cornuta onchiopsis =

Conservation status
- Extinct (late 20th century) (IUCN 3.1)

Scientific classification
- Kingdom: Animalia
- Phylum: Chordata
- Class: Reptilia
- Order: Squamata
- Suborder: Iguania
- Family: Iguanidae
- Genus: Cyclura
- Species: C. cornuta
- Subspecies: †C. c. onchiopsis

Trinomial name
- †Cyclura cornuta onchiopsis Cope, 1885

Synonyms
- C.[yclura] onchiopsis Cope, 1885; C.[yclura] nigerrima Cope, 1885; Cyclura onchiopsis – Cope, 1886; Cyclura cornuta onchiopsis – Schwartz & Thomas, 1975; Cyclura cornuta onchiopsis – Schwartz & Carey, 1977; Cyclura onchiopsis – Powell, 1999

Extinct subspecies of lizard

Cyclura cornuta onchiopsis, the Navassa Island iguana, was a subspecies of rhinoceros iguana that was found on the Caribbean island of Navassa.

== Taxonomy ==
Its specific name, cornuta, is the feminine form of the Latin adjective cornutus, meaning "horned" and refers to the horned projections on the snouts of males of the species. The species was first described by American herpetologist Edward Drinker Cope in 1885.

In 1885, Cope first described the lizard as two species in the same paper: C. onchiopsis and C. nigerrima, due to the animal's almost black coloration. A year later he renamed it as C. onchiopsis. Herpetologists Albert Schwartz and Richard Thomas officially reclassified it as a subspecies of C. cornuta 90 years later, based on the writings of Thomas Barbour and Robert Mertens, yet presented numerous data relating to scale count that suggested otherwise. In 1977, Schwartz and Carey wrote “It is even conceivable that onchiopsis should be considered a species distinct from C. cornuta on the basis of this single character (distinctly smaller dorsolateral scales) (plus perhaps other modalities), but to do so would obscure its obvious affinities with the latter species.” The IUCN still considers the iguana to be its own species C. onchiopsis.

In 1999, Dr Robert Powell wrote that, based on these prior studies, this animal should be elevated to full species status, distinct from C. cornuta.

== Description ==
These lizards varied in length from 60 to 136 cm (24 to 54 in), with skin colors ranging from a steely gray to a dark green and even brown, and possessed a bony-plated pseudo-horn or outgrowth which resembled the horn of a rhinoceros.

== Status ==
Navassa Island was visited in 1966 and 1967 and no animals were present. An entomologist visited the island again in 1986 and saw no signs of any iguanas, although he was not specifically looking for them. An extensive search again in 1999 failed to find any iguanas. Military occupation of the island prior to the 1960s may have been responsible for its demise, or years of mining guano for fertilizer; the introduction of feral dogs, goats, and rats may have also been to blame. Dr Robert Powell's research while at the Department of Natural Sciences, Avila College, Kansas City, Missouri, suggests that the iguanas disappeared before the introduction of feral species, as a result of habitat change or hunting by man. Noted herpetoculturist David Blair maintains that some of these animals may remain in captivity somewhere in the world, but admits they would be very aged specimens.
