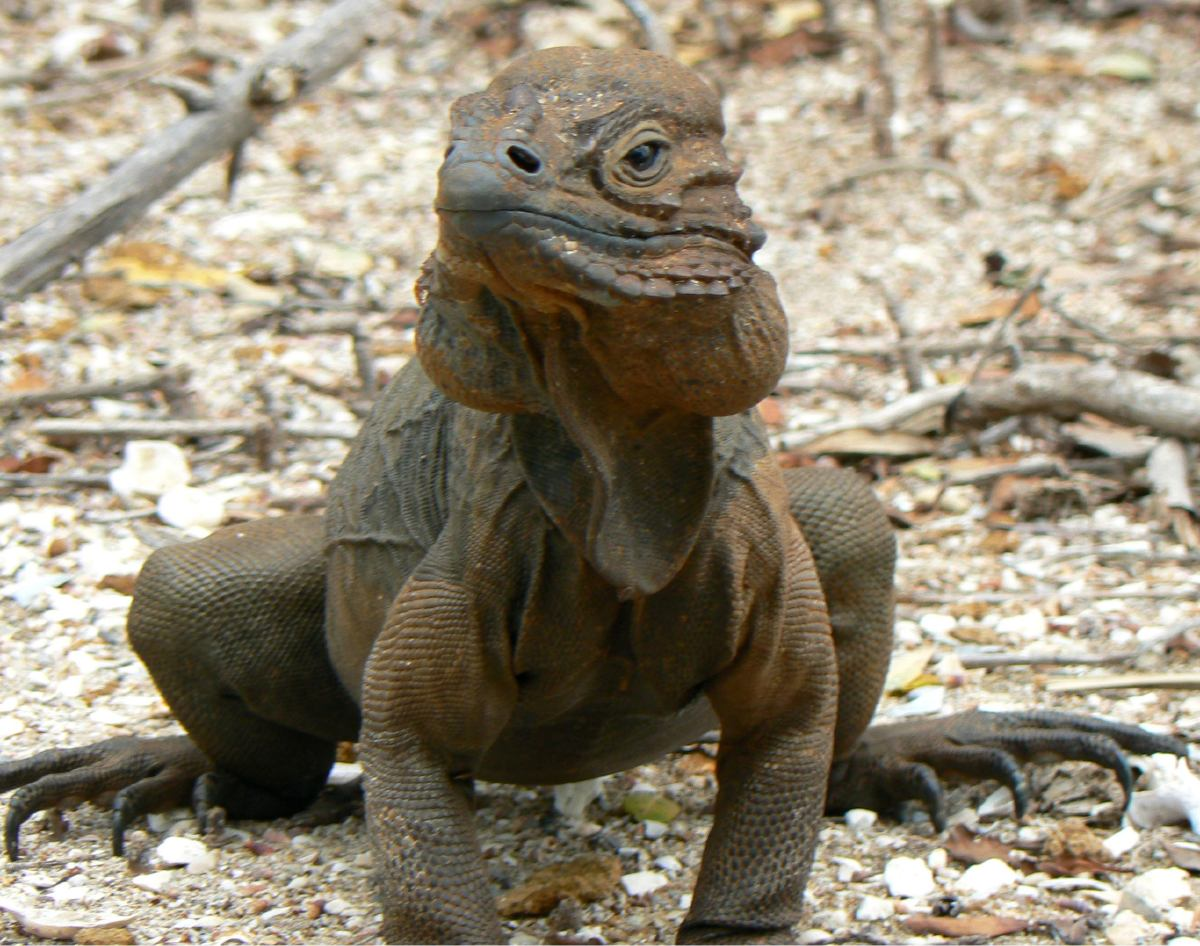
- A male rhinoceros iguana, Pedernales, Dominican Republic

Conservation status
- Endangered (IUCN 3.1)
- CITES Appendix I

Scientific classification
- Kingdom: Animalia
- Phylum: Chordata
- Class: Reptilia
- Order: Squamata
- Suborder: Iguania
- Family: Iguanidae
- Genus: Cyclura
- Species: C. cornuta

Binomial name
- Cyclura cornuta (Bonnaterre, 1789)

Subspecies
- C. c. cornuta; †C. c. onchiopsis

= Rhinoceros iguana =

Species of iguana endemic to the Caribbean

The rhinoceros iguana (Cyclura cornuta) is an endangered species of iguana that is (habituated) endemic to the Caribbean island of Hispaniola (shared by Haiti and the Dominican Republic) and its surrounding islands. A large lizard, they vary in length from 60 to 136 centimetres (24 to 54 in), and skin colours range from a steely grey to a dark green and even brown. Their name derives from the bony-plated pseudo-horn or outgrowth which resembles the horn of a rhinoceros on the iguana's snout. It is known to coexist with the Ricord's iguana (C. ricordii); the two species are the only taxa of rock iguana to do so.

== Taxonomy ==
The rhinoceros iguana is a species of lizard belonging to the genus Cyclura. The rhinoceros iguana's specific name, cornuta, is the feminine form of the Latin adjective cornutus, meaning "horned" and refers to the horned projections on the snouts of males of the species. The species was first identified by Pierre Joseph Bonnaterre in 1789.

In addition to the nominate race (C. c. cornuta) found on Hispaniola, the other subspecies is the extinct Navassa Island iguana (C. c. onchiopsis). The Mona ground iguana (Cyclura stejnegeri) from Puerto Rico was originally thought to be a subspecies (and still is by some taxonomists), as Cyclura cornuta stejnegeri.

== Anatomy and morphology ==
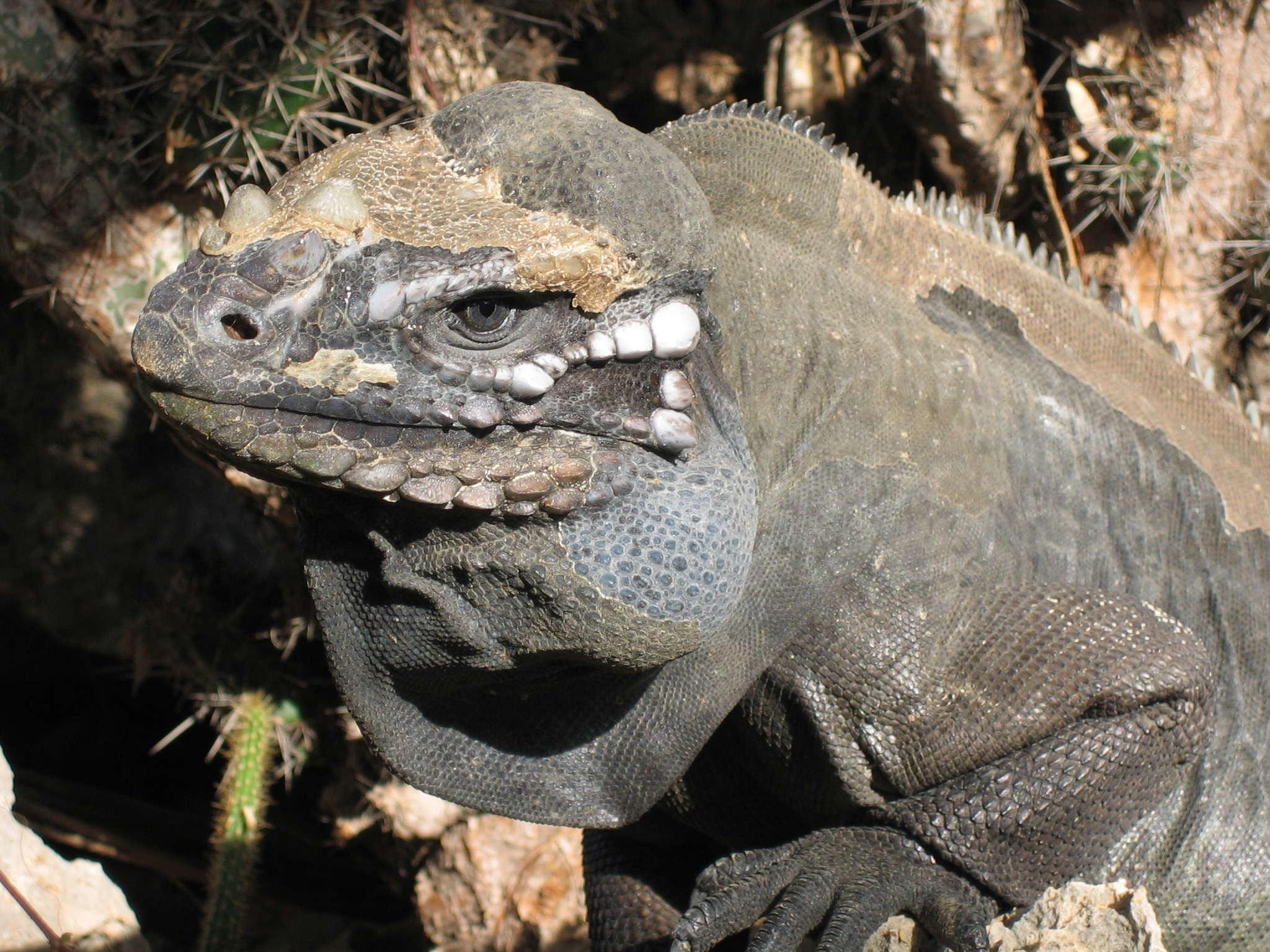
Bust; Jaragua National Park

The rhinoceros iguana, like other members of the genus Cyclura, is a large-bodied, heavy-headed lizard with strong legs and a vertically flattened tail. A crest of pointed horned scales extends from the nape of their neck to the tip of their tail. Their color is a uniform gray to brown drab. Most adults weigh 4.56 to 9 kilograms (10.1 to 19.8 lb). Like all reptiles, rhinoceros iguanas are cold-blooded, meaning they need external sources to heat themselves; they move as the sun shifts in order to get an optimal internal temperature.

These iguanas are characterized by the growth of bony prominent tubercles on their snouts which resemble horns. Males possess an adipose pad in the form of a "helmet" on the occipital region of the head, and a large dewlap. This species, like other species of Cyclura, is sexually dimorphic; males are larger than females, and have more prominent dorsal crests and "horns" in addition to large femoral pores on their thighs, which are used to release pheromones.

== Distribution and habitat ==
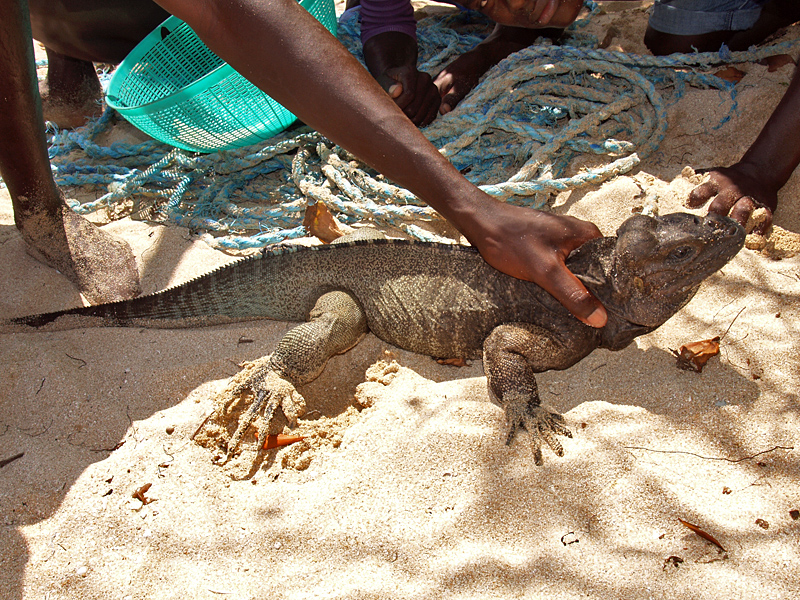
A rhinoceros iguana on Limbe Island, Haiti

Ranging in scattered locations throughout Hispaniola (in both Haiti and the Dominican Republic), populations are stable only on Isla Beata and the extreme of the Barahona Peninsula, inside Jaragua National Park. There are moderately dense populations in the southeastern region of Haiti and its offshore islands, including the brackish lake of Étang Saumâtre, as well as the Dominican hypersaline Lake Enriquillo and its lake island, Isla Cabritos. Populations in Haiti are even more endangered due to deforestation, poaching for bushmeat, and human clearing practices.

Though not restricted to one single habitat, the iguanas are found most abundantly in scrub woodlands of the Hispaniolan dry forests (characterized by xeric, rocky terrain of eroded limestone with minimal flora), coastal terraces, lowlands of the mainland, plus several offshore islands and small cays, all with slightly different habitat types. The favored biome of the rhinoceros iguana to live within is one that receives very little rain and has few trees or shrubs. True to the name "rock" iguana, they favor rather barren landscapes with smooth, large boulder formations and rocky outcrops for basking on, with adequate crevices and sheltered areas for retreating into. They will immediately flee into the rocks and crevasses to hide from predators such as humans, birds of prey, feral dogs and cats.

Descending down a rock face; Colchester Zoo

This species has been known to exhibit phenotypic plasticity like other iguanas. While historically present near coastlines, human activity and introduced predators have forced rhinoceros iguanas inland.

An individual was photographed on May 4, 2008 on Limbe Island in northern Haiti. It had been caught by a group of fishermen from Bas-Limbe, Bord de Mer village. The rhinoceros iguanas caught on Limbe Island are illegally eaten by the local population. This sighting represents a new area previously not thought to be in the range of C. cornuta.

Aside from Hispaniola and its surrounding islands, the rhinoceros iguana was previously found on Navassa Island (with an endemic subspecies: C. c. onchiopsis), but was extirpated there.

== Behaviour ==
Rhinoceros iguanas, like most members of Cyclura, are usually docile and well-tempered. As with many lizard species, "head-bobbing" is a commonly observed form of communication used by the rhinoceros iguana. Males, especially, appear to "nod" their heads toward one another as an assertion of dominance, or announcing their "ownership" of an area. It is oftentimes a warning to not come any closer, as well as to communicate (with females) their desire to mate. At times, this form of body language is directed at humans (by both wild and captive iguanas) as a warning, or as a sort of "greeting" to their human caretaker(s). The females (more or less) only nod their heads to ward off incessant advances from males, and female-to-female head bobbing is infrequent, though not nonexistent.

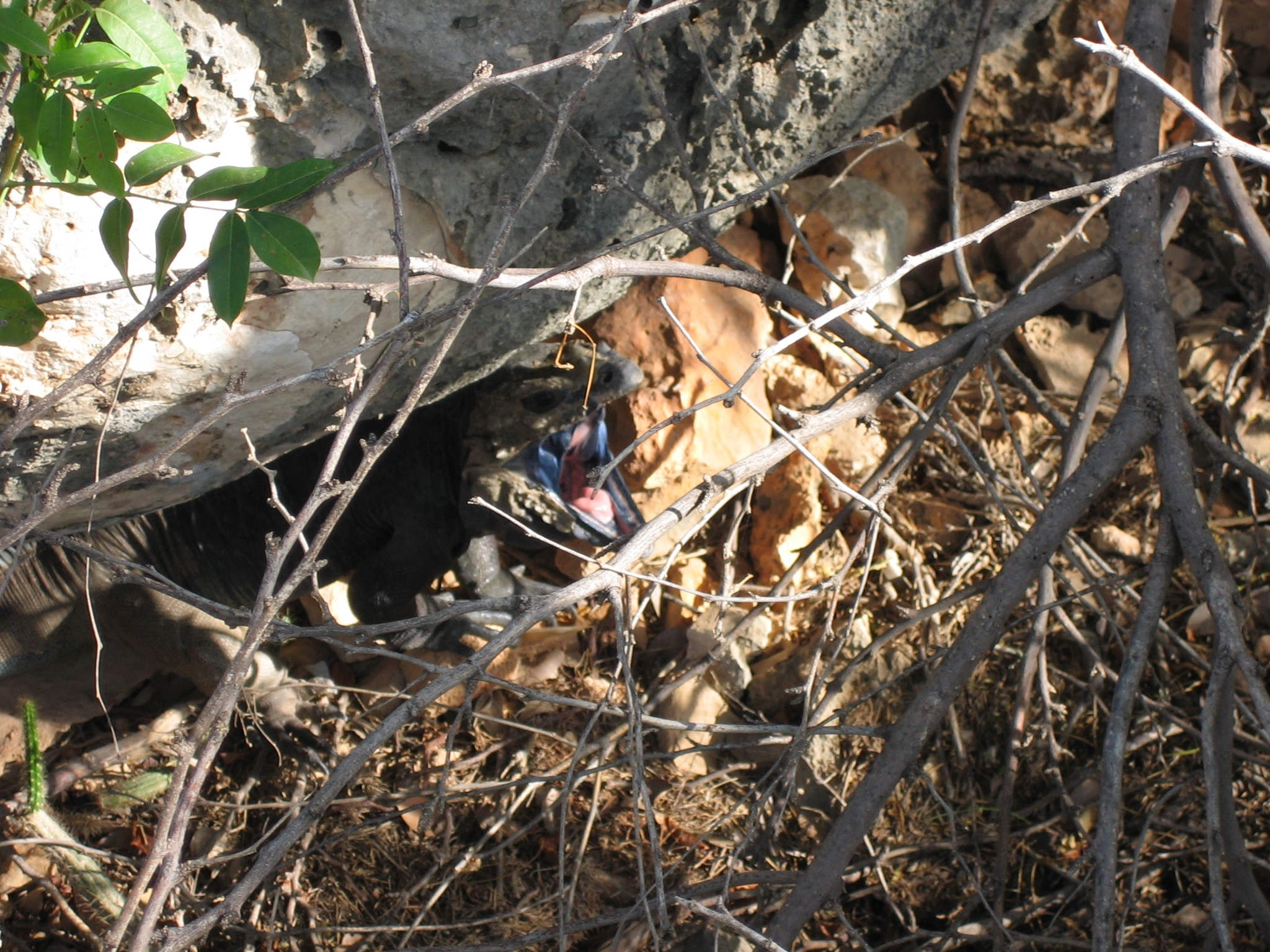
C. cornuta threat display from lair, Jaragua National Park

In general, rhinoceros iguanas (especially captive bred individuals) are among the most docile and human-tolerant of reptiles; some iguanas appear to desire human attention, seeming to enjoy being petted as much as a domestic dog or cat would. Even with this overall docility, levels of human tolerance can vary greatly from iguana to iguana, season to season, and even day by day. Iguanas are highly in-tune with their surroundings, being particularly sensitive to atmospheric and energetic nuances. A normally friendly iguana may have "mood swings", or show a desire to be left alone, for unknown reasons. Though they prefer to flee when attacked or threatened, they will aggressively attack by biting and repeatedly striking with their thick tail if cornered. Their long claws can also cause significant scratches (even drawing blood), though this is not necessarily a defensive act, but can simply result from handling a more friendly iguana. Some owners opt to wear thick, long leather gloves, even with docile individuals.

=== Diet ===
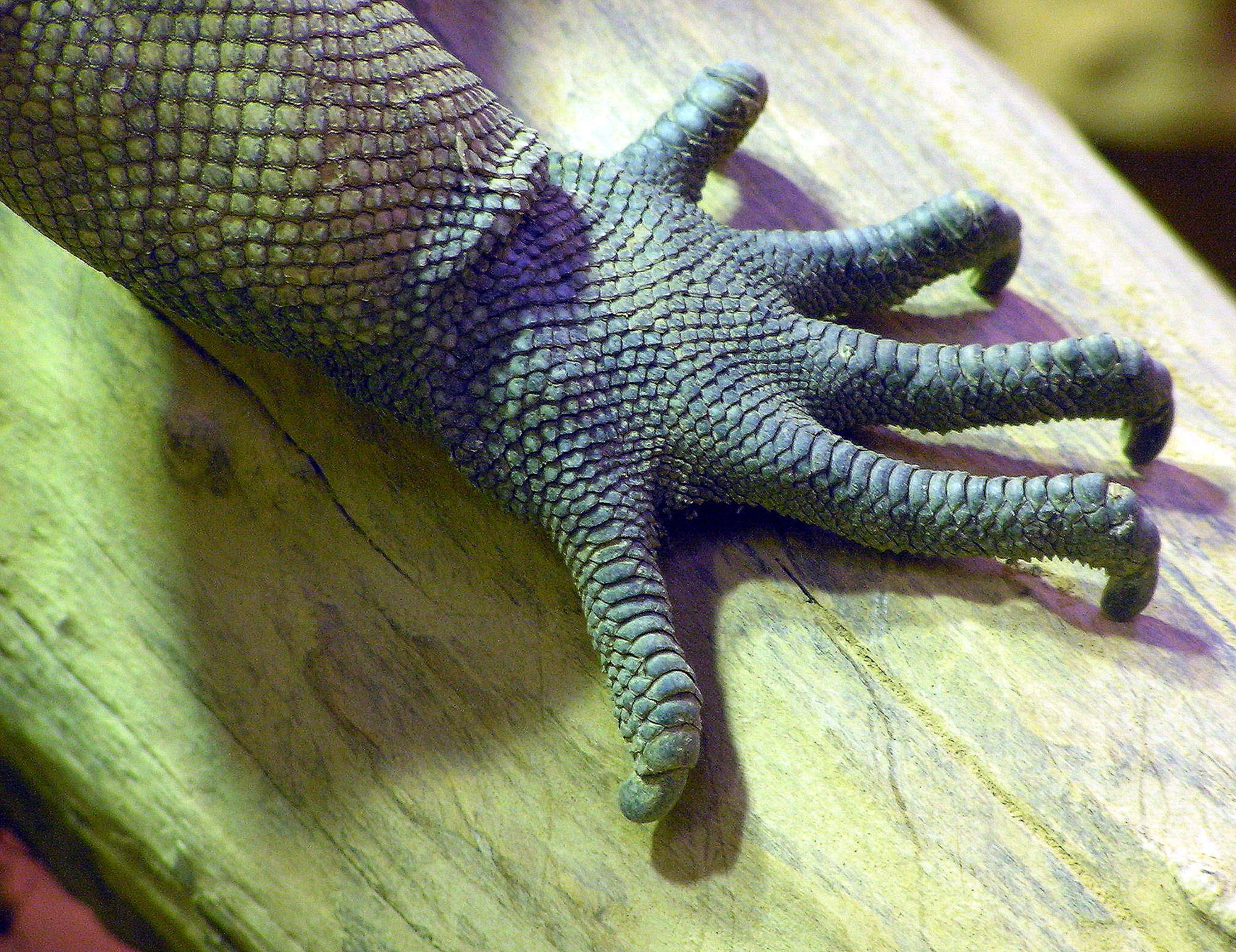
The forepaw of a rhinoceros iguana at Bristol Zoo

The rhinoceros iguana, like most Cyclura species, is primarily herbivorous, consuming leaves, flowers, seeds, berries, and fruits from different plant species. A study in 2000 by Dr Allison Alberts of the San Diego Zoo revealed that seeds passing through the digestive tracts of Cyclura species germinate more rapidly than those that do not. These seeds in the fruits consumed by cycluras have an adaptive advantage by sprouting before the end of very short rainy seasons. The rhinoceros iguana is also an important means of distributing these seeds to new areas (particularly when females migrate to nesting sites) and, as the largest native herbivores of their island's ecosystem, they are essential for maintaining the balance between climate and vegetation. Rhinoceros iguanas do appear to be opportunistic carnivores, as individual animals have been observed eating small lizards, snakes, land crabs, insects, and carrion (especially dead birds and fish).

=== Mating and reproduction ===
Male rhinoceros iguanas, unlike other members of the genus Cyclura, reach sexual maturity at four to five years of age. Females become sexually mature at two to three years of age. Male rhinoceros iguanas are territorial and the most aggressive males will have the largest range of territory. Mating takes place at the beginning of, or just prior to, the first rainy season of the year (May to June) and lasts for two to three weeks. Females lay from 2 to 34 eggs, with an average clutch size of 17, within 40 days. Females guard their nests for several days after laying their eggs, and incubation lasts approximately 85 days.

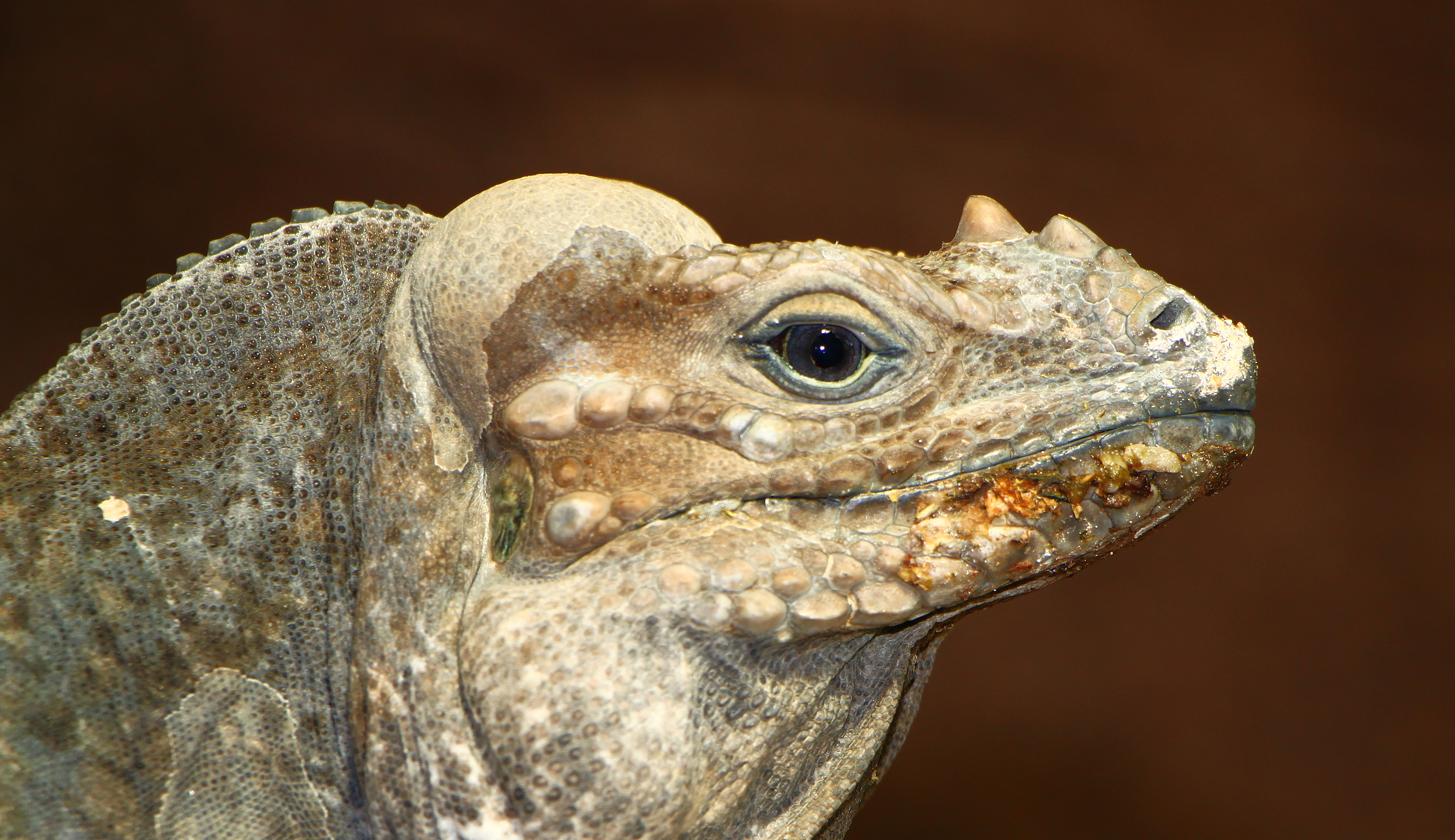
The horns of rhinoceros iguana are not a dimorphic feature

Notably, despite rhinoceros iguanas exhibiting some sexual dimorphism in size and horn development, they exhibit comparatively less sexual dimorphism than most other iguanas. Both male and female rhinoceros iguanas lack prominent mid-dorsal spines on their neck (which are typically very large in male iguanas of other species), both have well-developed dewlaps, and both develop horns. By contrast, in many other animals that exhibit horns such as ungulates or rhinoceros beetles, horns are often only present in males. Rhinoceros iguanas are also reported to show less dimorphism in size than other iguana species. This reduced dimorphism has been suggested to be due to intense female-female competition in rhinoceros iguanas, given the scarcity of nesting sites in their island environment, and females will use their horns to fight with one another over access to nesting sites much as males fight for access to females. Similar female-female combat over nesting sites has been documented in other island iguanas such as the marine iguana.

=== Predators ===
The rhinoceros iguana's only confirmed native predator is the Hispaniola racer (Haitiophis anomalus), a large snake which has been recorded to give chase to juvenile iguanas, as well as wait for them outside the exit holes of their burrow. However, most predation of iguanas comes from invasive species like feral dogs (Canis familiaris), feral cats (Felis catus), small Indian mongooses (Urva auropunctata), and feral pigs (Sus domesticus), which all feed on eggs, adults, and juveniles.

== Conservation ==
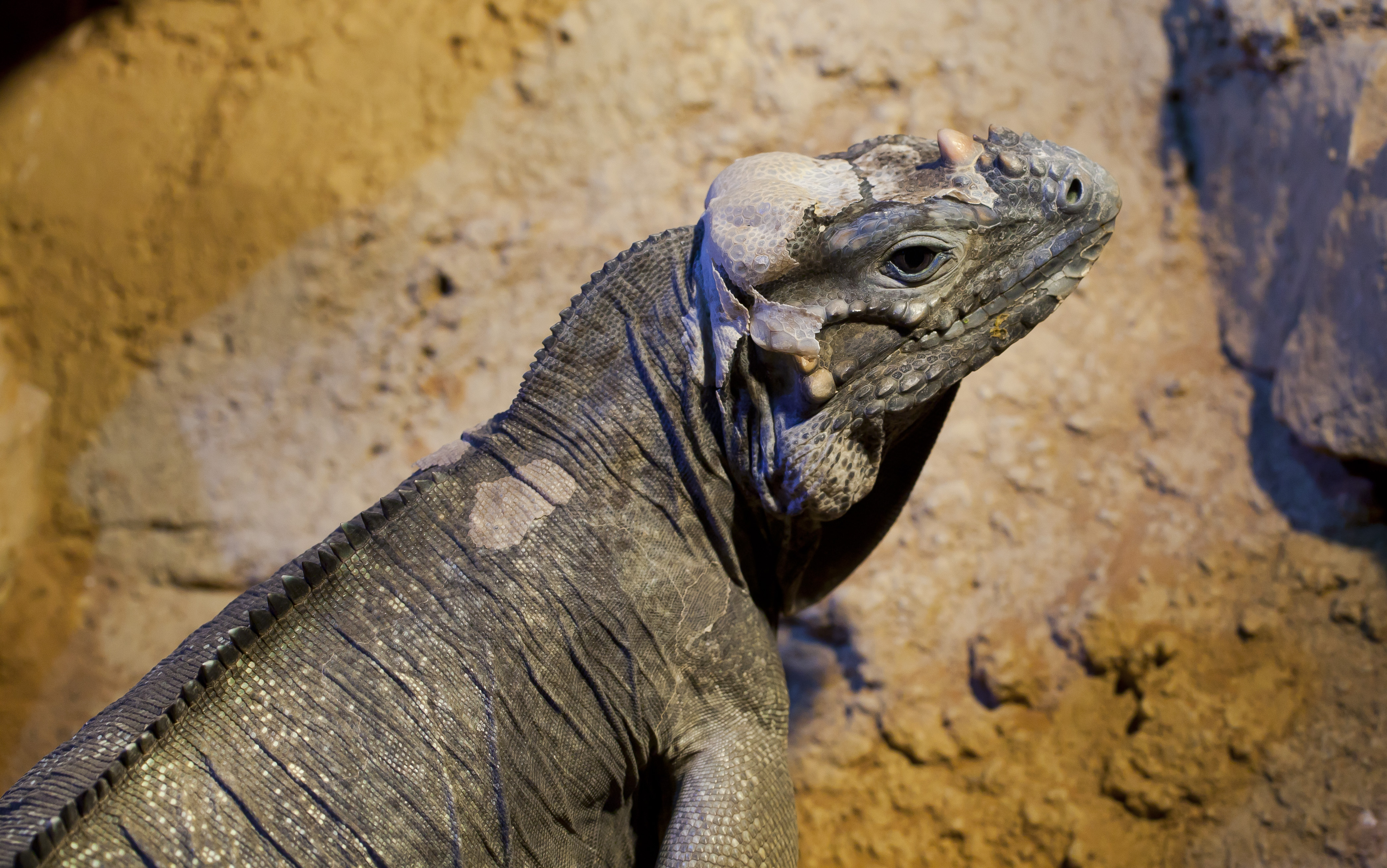
Rhinoceros iguana at the Munich Zoo

Although rhinoceros iguanas are the most common species of Cyclura kept in captivity, as of 1996, approximately 10,000-17,000 iguanas remained in the wild. A successful breeding program existed at the Parque Zoológico Nacional of the Dominican Republic (ZooDom) from 1974 to 1994, with an average of 100 babies hatching annually. These efforts included reintroductions of captive-bred "head-started" young to several protected areas in the southwest Dominican Republic, in order to reduce the odds of predation by snakes and introduced carnivorans, such as mongooses or feral cats and dogs. The program has not continued since 1995, due to an administrative change at the zoo. International trade in the species is regulated under the Appendix I of the Convention on International Trade in Endangered Species. Illegal logging, competition from domestic grazers (cows, pigs, goats), predation on young by invasive species, limestone mining, harvesting for the pet trade, hunting for bushmeat, pollution, and wildfires are all manmade threats to the rhinoceros iguana's survival.

== Captivity ==
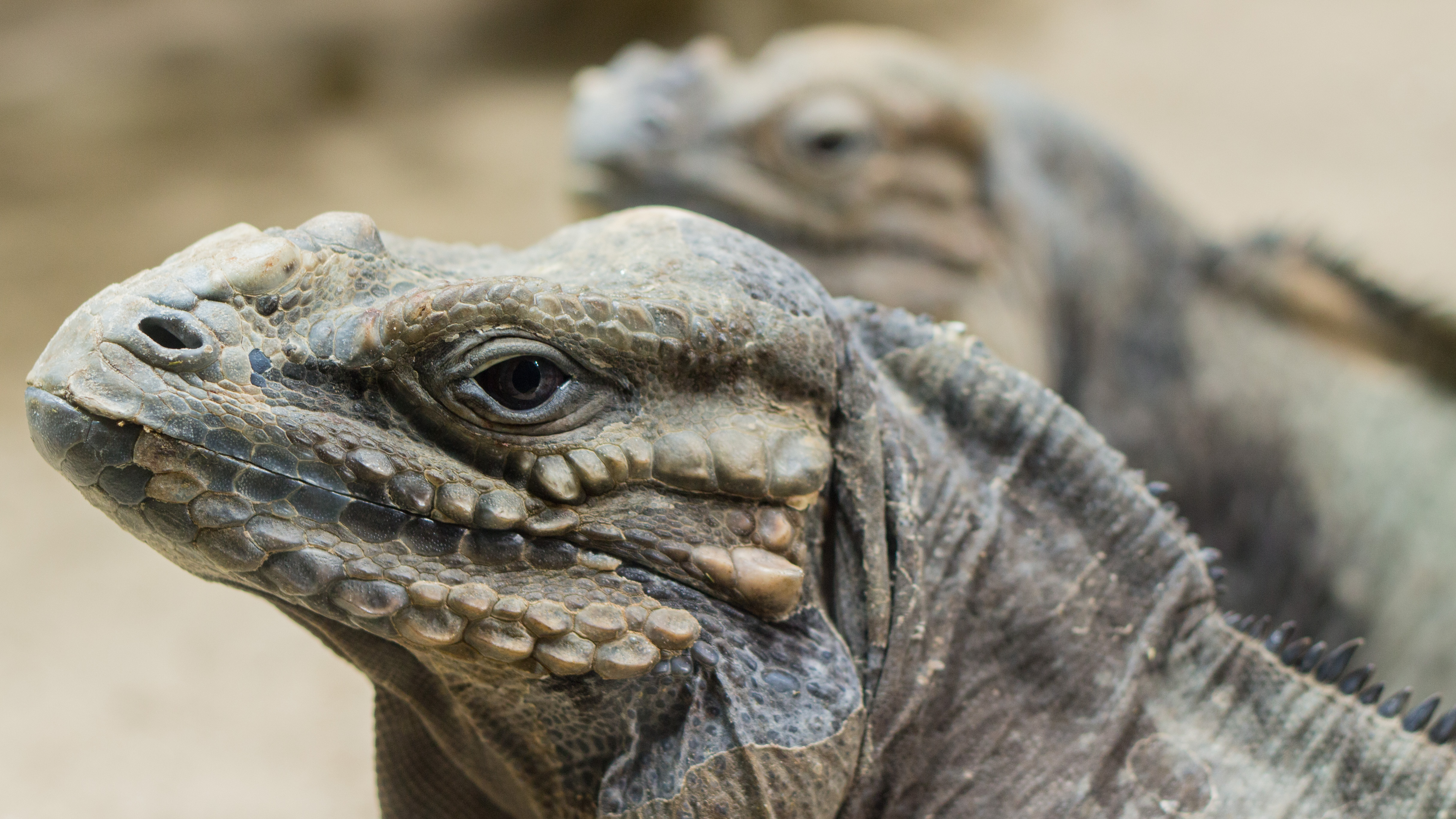
Rhinoceros iguanas at the Schönbrunn Zoo in Vienna.

The rhinoceros iguana is well established in captivity, both in public and private collections. As of 2007, rhinoceros iguanas were present in captivity throughout the United States (total 39 males, 32 females, and 36 undetermined individuals) at 20 zoological institutions, with an additional 533 animals of unassigned subspecies, reported by seven American Zoological and Aquarium Association institutions. 77 zoos in Europe also hold rhinoceros iguanas, all of which are assumed to be of the nominate subspecies (C. cornuta cornuta), including 14 zoos in the United Kingdom and 12 in Germany. The actual number may be much higher, considering most of these zoos hold multiple individuals and there are even more animals kept at South/Central American and Asian zoos, as well as the amount kept as pets in private collections. As a result, the demand for wild-caught animals to supply zoos and the pet trade has been reduced.
