= Beata Island =

Small island on the Caribbean Sea

Beata Island, Pedernales
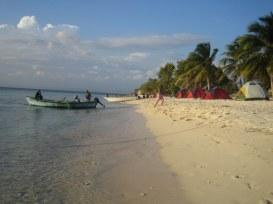
- Beata's shore

- Location within the Dominican Republic

Geography
- Coordinates: 17°34′42″N 71°30′42″W
- Area: 41 km^{2} (16 sq mi)

Administration
- Dominican Republic
- Province: Pedernales Province

Demographics
- Population: 10 (2010)
- Pop. density: 0.41/km^{2} (1.06/sq mi)

Beata Island (Spanish: Isla Beata) is a small island in the Caribbean Sea, located 7 km (4 mi) southwest from Cape Beata. Some 12 km (7 mi) southwest of it lies the smaller Alto Velo Island. It is politically part of the Dominican Republic, and is roughly triangle-shaped and fairly flat, with an approximate area of 41 km^{2} (16 sq mi).

The island, along with Alto Velo Island, is part of the UNESCO Biosphere Reserve named the Jaragua National Park.

== History ==
Beata Island was discovered by Europeans during the second voyage of Christopher Columbus in 1494. Originally populated by Taíno natives, the island became a colonial asset of the Captaincy General of Santo Domingo and the greater Spanish Empire. The island was the site of various military engagements between the Spanish and roving pirates.

== Geography ==
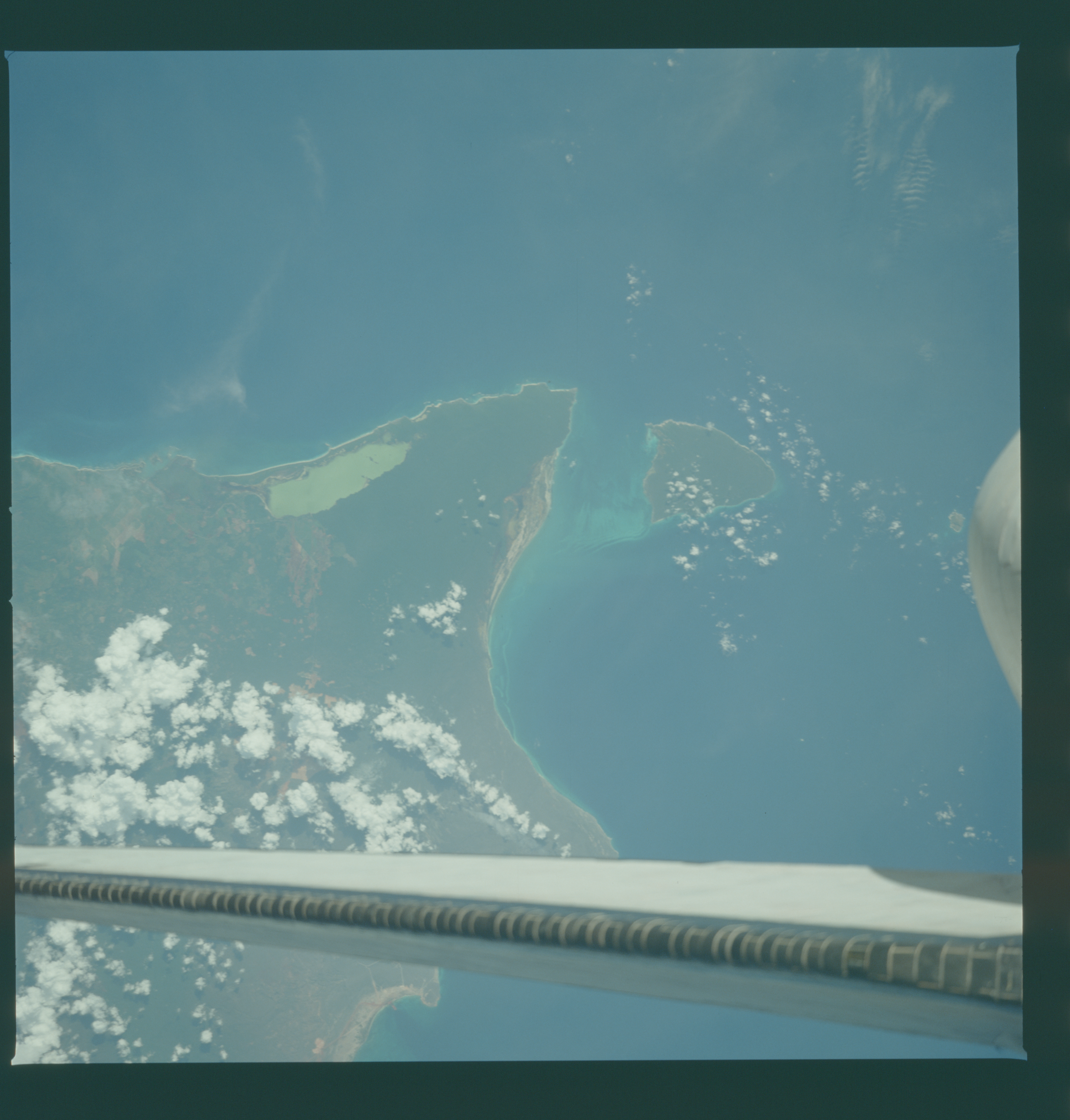
Satellite image of Isla Beata.

The landscape is somewhat varied, with mangrove swamps on parts of the North shore, sandy coves and beaches on the west coast. Most of the interior of the island is covered by various subtypes of xeric semi-deciduous limestone forests.

Geologically, the island is basically made out of limestone, the erosion of which causes very jagged surfaces on exposed rocks (called diente de perro or dogtooth), and several sinkholes and cenotes. It has a large population of rhinoceros iguanas. Beata Island is currently uninhabited, save for short stays by fishermen from the mainland and a permanent Dominican military base with rotating personnel.

== See also ==
- Geography of the Dominican Republic
