= Pedernales, Dominican Republic =

Capital of Pedernales Province, Dominican Republic

Pedernales
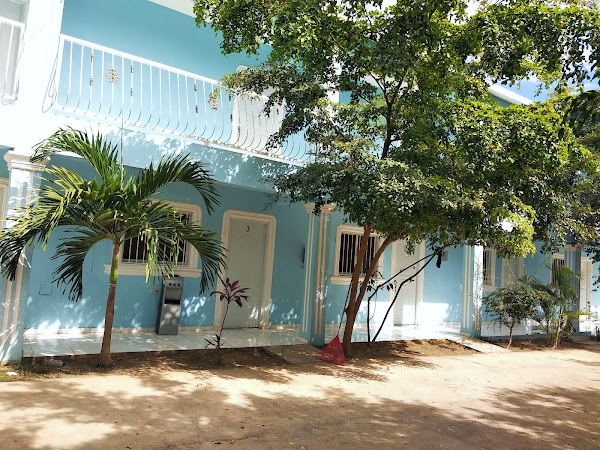
- Pedernales Dominican Republic town house.

- Location of Pedernales in the Dominican Republic
- Coordinates: 18°02′N 71°45′W
- Country: Dominican Republic
- Province: Pedernales
- Founded: 1927
- Municipality since: 1957

Area
  - Total: 2,080.93 km^{2} (803.45 sq mi)
- Elevation: 10 m (33 ft)

Population (2012)
  - Total: 37,955
  - Density: 18.239/km^{2} (47.240/sq mi)
  - Demonym: Pedernalense
- Distance to – Santo Domingo: 335 km
- Municipal Districts: 2
- Climate: BSh

Pedernales (Spanish pronunciation: [peðeɾˈnales]) is the capital of the Pedernales Province, in the Dominican Republic. It is located in the southwest of the country, on the Dominican Republic–Haiti border, and has a crossing to the Haitian town of Anse-à-Pitres.

== National Parks ==
- Parque Nacional Jaragua
- Parque Nacional Sierra de Bahoruco

These two parks, along with Lake Enriquillo and adjoining zones of the Municipality Pedernales, form the first biosphere reserve in the country.

== History ==
The official foundation of the colony of Pedernales came about in the year 1927 during the Government of Horacio Vásquez, who appointed as Administrator the well-known writer Sócrates Nolasco.

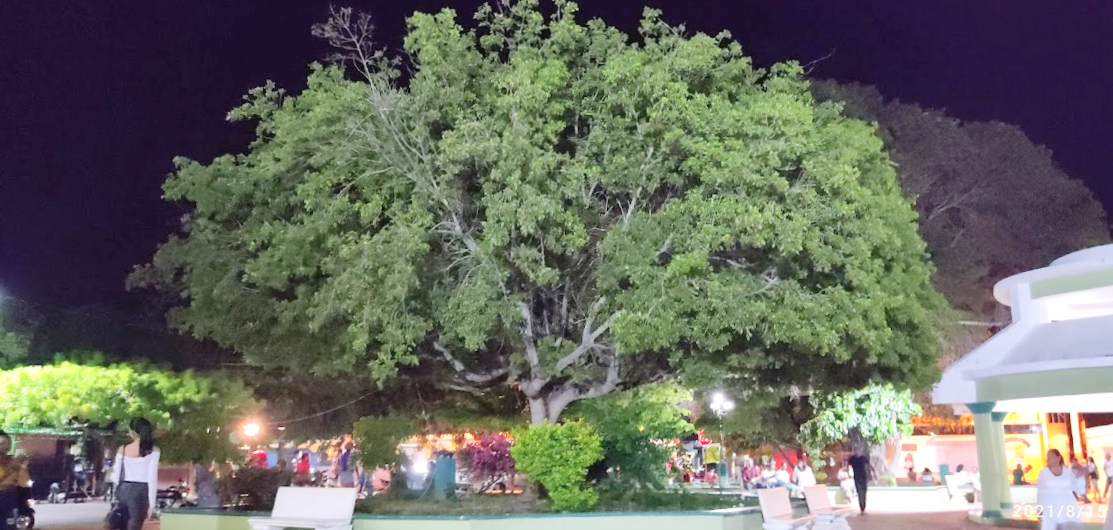
Park of Pedernales Dominican Republic

The colonists came mostly from Duvergé. The first one was Mr. Genaro Pérez Rocha, a prosperous rancher, who would later bring the first resident families who came from Duvergé. In the year 1937 the highway was built to join this locality and Oviedo, in whose building 500 men participated, divided into brigades of 10 each.

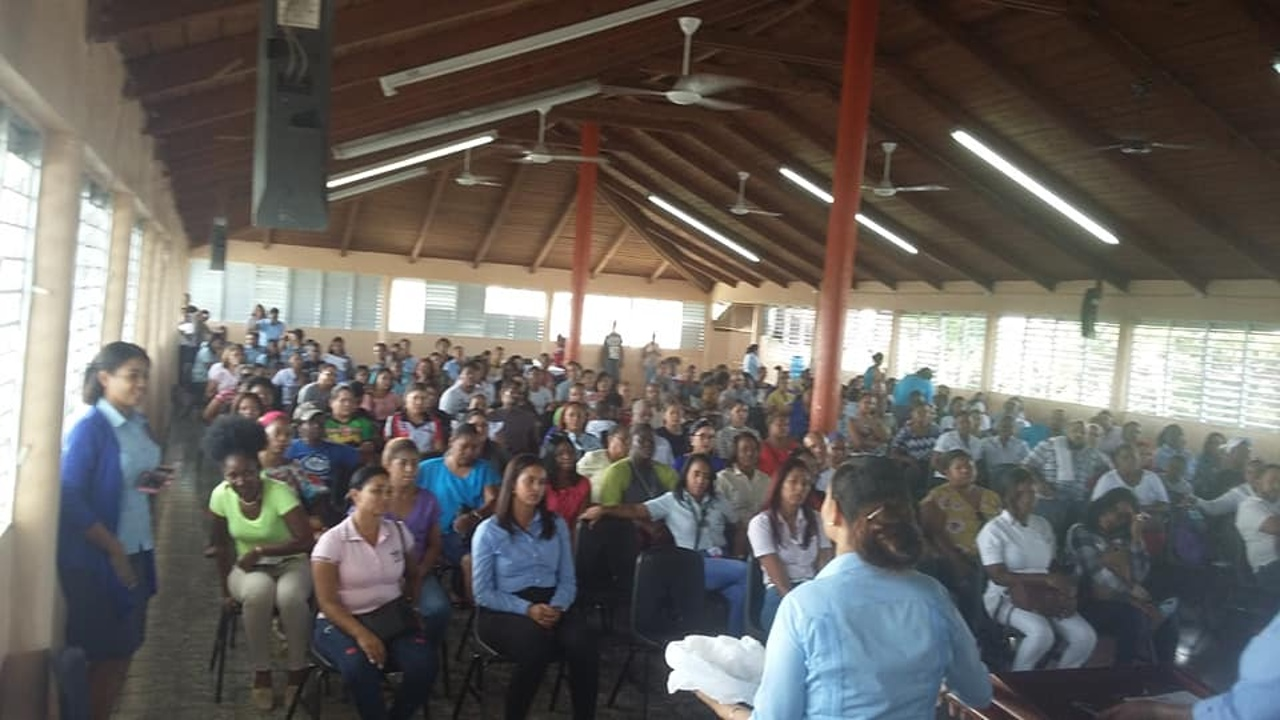
Pedernales, Dominican Republic people

By Resolution of the City Hall of Enriquillo in 1938, Pedernales was raised to Municipal District.

The name of Pedernales stems from the mineral flint (pedernal in Spanish), which is a very common variety of quartz of yellowish color "that produces spark with the link". This stone is found in the river of Pedernales, which marks the southernmost part of the frontier between Haiti and the Dominican Republic.

== Bahía de las Águilas ==
Pedernales lies a short way from Bahía de las Águilas, an isolated, unspoilt beach known for its great beauty and biodiversity.

== Touristic Places ==
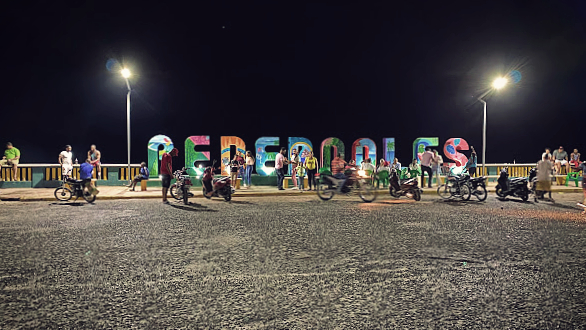
Park of Pedernales Dominican Republic

- Hoyo de Pelempito
- Cabo Rojo
- Río de Paso Sena
- El Mulito
- Playa Pedernales
- Playa Bahía de las Águilas

== Culture ==
- Grupo de Baile Folklórico
- Baton Ballet
- Banda de Música
- Cockfighting
- Palos y Atabales

== Climate ==
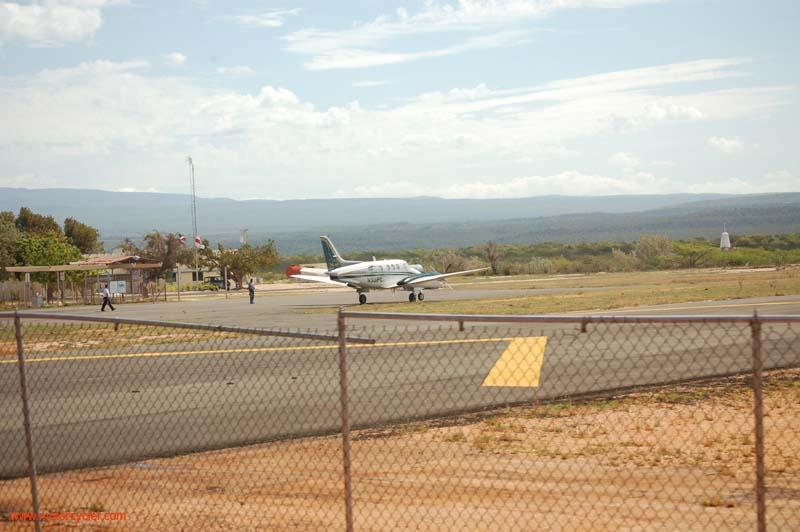
Airport in the Cabo Rojo area

Pedernales has a hot semi-arid climate (Köppen BSh) characterized by consistently high temperatures year-round. It has a location over a number of rain shadows through the highlands of Hispaniola from the northeasterly trade winds. Rainfall is highest in September and October when tropical cyclones may strike the whole island, and temperatures are generally warmer during the day and night than in much of the tropics, making one of the warmest and driest areas in the Dominican Republic.

Climate data for Pedernales, Dominican Republic (1961–1990)
Month	Jan	Feb	Mar	Apr	May	Jun	Jul	Aug	Sep	Oct	Nov	Dec	Year
Record high °C (°F)	36.0 (96.8)	35.5 (95.9)	37.5 (99.5)	38.5 (101.3)	39.1 (102.4)	39.0 (102.2)	39.7 (103.5)	39.3 (102.7)	38.9 (102.0)	38.9 (102.0)	37.5 (99.5)	36.7 (98.1)	39.7 (103.5)
Mean daily maximum °C (°F)	31 (88)	31 (88)	32 (90)	33 (91)	33 (91)	33 (91)	33 (91)	33 (91)	33 (91)	32 (90)	31 (88)	31 (88)	32 (90)
Daily mean °C (°F)	26.5 (79.7)	26.5 (79.7)	27.5 (81.5)	28.5 (83.3)	29 (84)	29.5 (85.1)	29.5 (85.1)	29.5 (85.1)	29.5 (85.1)	29 (84)	28 (82)	27 (81)	28.5 (83.3)
Mean daily minimum °C (°F)	22 (72)	22 (72)	23 (73)	24 (75)	25 (77)	25 (77)	25 (77)	26 (79)	26 (79)	25 (77)	24 (75)	23 (73)	24.2 (75.6)
Record low °C (°F)	15.3 (59.5)	15.3 (59.5)	13.7 (56.7)	15.4 (59.7)	14.0 (57.2)	11.5 (52.7)	15.7 (60.3)	16.0 (60.8)	14.0 (57.2)	15.8 (60.4)	15.0 (59.0)	15.5 (59.9)	11.5 (52.7)
Average rainfall mm (inches)	8.5 (0.33)	9.4 (0.37)	20.2 (0.80)	42.0 (1.65)	71.1 (2.80)	24.1 (0.95)	27.0 (1.06)	57.2 (2.25)	91.4 (3.60)	83.6 (3.29)	42.8 (1.69)	20.3 (0.80)	497.6 (19.59)
Average rainy days (≥ 1.0 mm)	1.3	1.2	2.2	3.6	4.6	2.3	2.8	3.8	6.0	6.2	3.4	1.6	39.0
Source 1: NOAA
Source 2:
