= Baoruco Mountain Range =

Mountain range in the Dominican Republic

Coordinates: 18°07′N 71°25′W

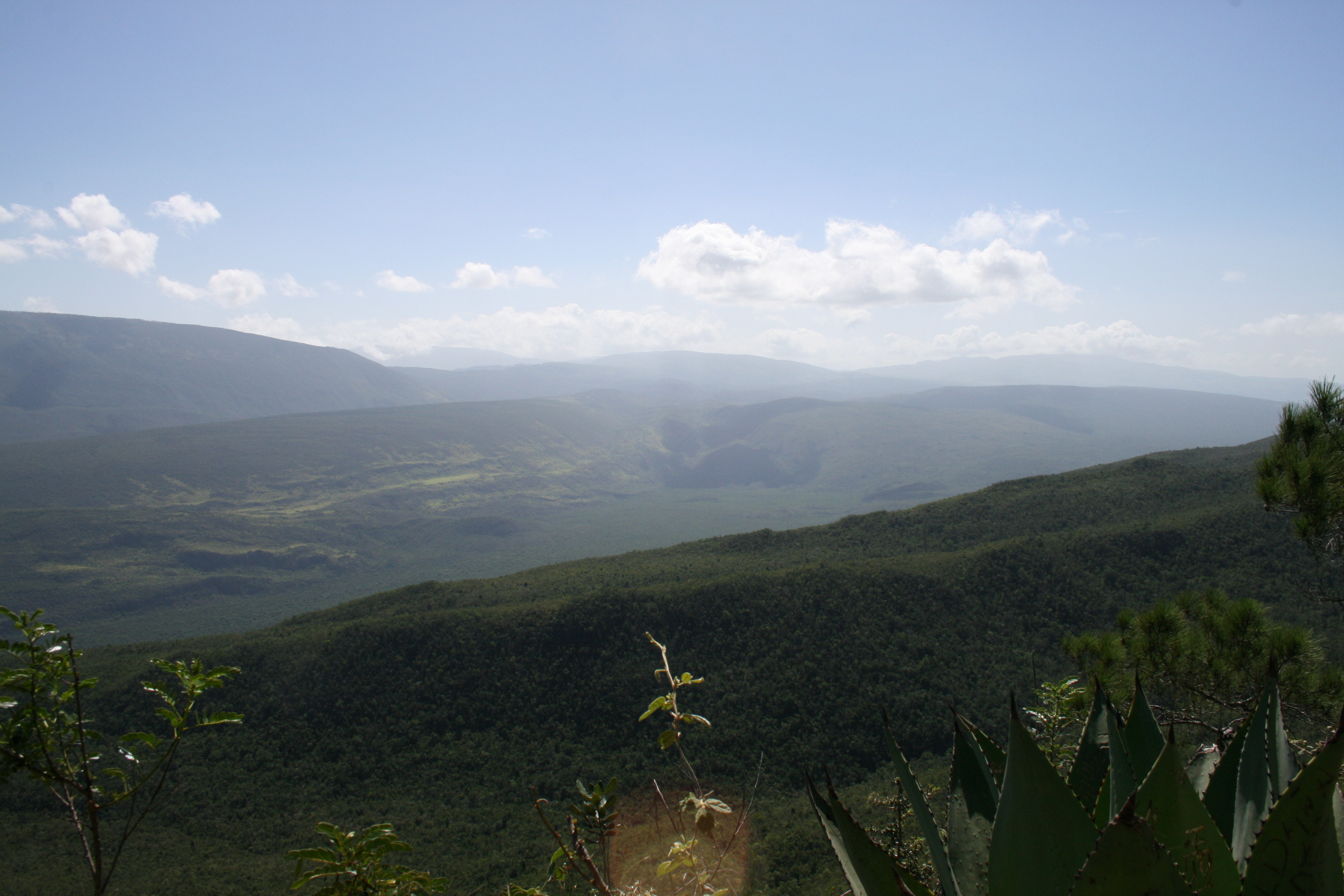
Hoyo de Pelempito, part of Sierra de Bahoruco

The Bahoruco Mountain Range—Sierra de Bahoruco (or Sierra de Bahoruco) is a mountain range located in the far southwestern region of the Dominican Republic. It is within Pedernales, Independencia, Barahona, and Bahoruco Provinces. A large part of the area is protected within the Sierra de Bahoruco National Park (Parque Nacional Sierra de Bahoruco), also a Biosphere reserve.

Its name is mentioned for the first time by Bartolomé de las Casas in his "Brief History of the Indies", who takes it from the phonetic sound used by the Taino Indians to describe that region.

It is rich in deposits of salt and gypsum, and also has a lagoon in the southern part (Oviedo lagoon) and between this mountain range and the Neiba mountain range is Lake Enriquillo, the largest in the Antilles.

== Geology ==
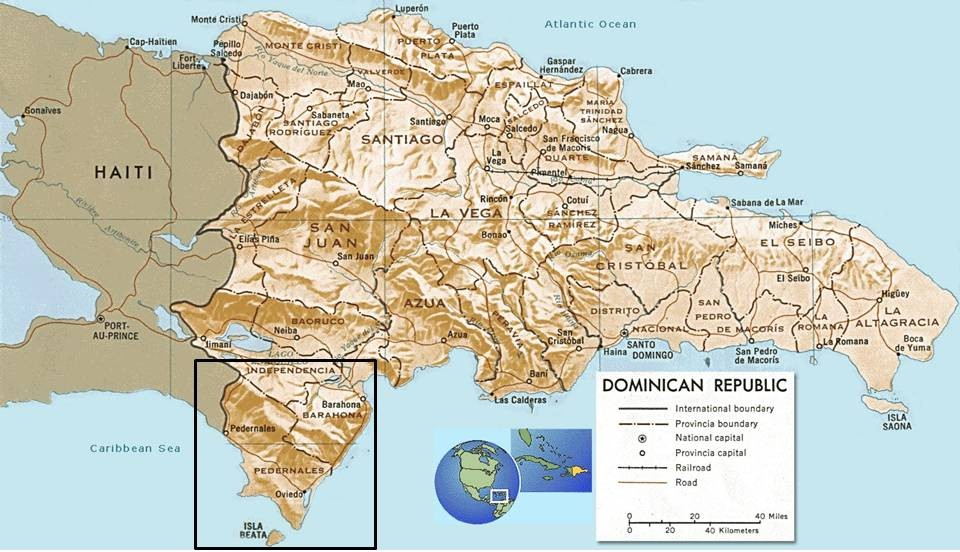
Location of the Sierra de Bahoruco mountain range.

The mountain range is a massif of volcanic origin from the Cretaceous period (from 145 to 66 million years ago) and later covered by a layer of calcareous sediment of marine origin, this means that the entire mountain range was once submerged under the sea and in mostly inhabited by corals that left their sediments.

The mountain range is formed by a complex of tectonic faults resulting from the collision of the Caribbean and Atlantic plates, rising and leaving the sea. This means that we can find rocks at more than 2000 meters high that at first glance can be seen remains of ancient corals that were in the sea.

== Etymology ==
Julian Granberry and Gary Vescelius (2004) suggest a Macoris etymology for the name Bahoruco, comparing it with baho-ro-eku 'within the jungle' in the purportedly related Warao language of the Orinoco Delta.

== Larimar ==
The Sierra de Bahoruco are noted for the blue colored concretions called larimar, which formed in the range's volcanic vesicles.

Larimar is the Dominican name for a mineral assemblage of acidic silicate hydrates of calcium and sodium. Larimar is a specific type of pectolite (occasionally as ratholite), a pyroxenoid mineral.
