= Pedernales Province =

Province of the Dominican Republic

Pedernales
- Province
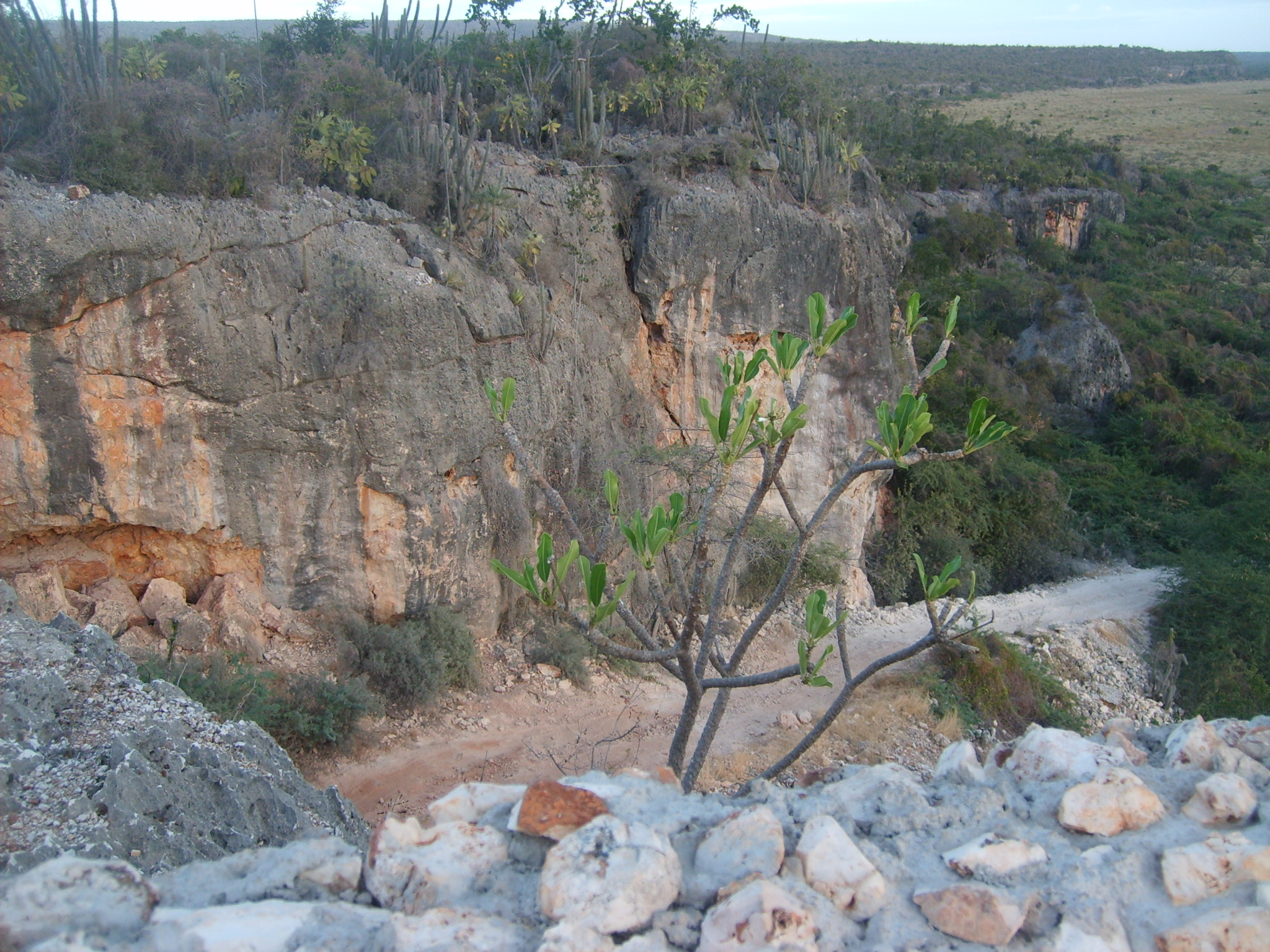
- Jaragua National Park in Pedernales, Dominican Republic

- Coat of arms

- Location of the Pedernales Province
- Country: Dominican Republic
- Province since: 1957
- Capital: Pedernales

Government
  - Type: Subdivisions
  - Body: 2 municipalities 2 municipal districts
  - Congresspersons: 1 Senator; 2 Deputies

Area
  - Total: 2,080.95 km^{2} (803.46 sq mi)

Population (2022 census)
  - Total: 34,375
  - Density: 16.519/km^{2} (42.784/sq mi)
- Time zone: UTC-4 (AST)
- Area code: 1-809 1-829 1-849
- ISO 3166-2: DO-16
- Postal Code: 84000

Pedernales (from Spanish 'flints'; pronounced [peðeɾˈnales]) is the southernmost province of the Dominican Republic, including the offshore island of Isla Beata. It was split from Barahona in 1957. Of its 2,080.95 km^{2}, 1,374 km^{2} belongs to the Jaragua National Park. A third of its population is of Haitian origin, the highest ratio within the country.

The capital of the province, Pedernales, was originally called Juan López, who was a Spanish inhabitant who had settled in the area around the 19th century.

The province was called Pedernales after the river located on the border with Haiti, in which flint is abundant. The indigenous people of the Dominican Republic, the Taíno, used them to make sharp tools, such as axes and arrowheads.

== Geography ==
The province of Pedernales is located in the southwest of the Dominican Republic, sharing its borders with the neighboring Haiti. It is located 330 km (kilometers) from Santo Domingo, the Dominican capital. It is part of the region called Enriquillo, and it is the seventh largest province in the country, with 2,042.40 km^{2} (square kilometers). It borders the province of Independencia to the north, and the province of Barahona to the east.

Pedernales is located in a geomorphological region known as Procurrente de Barahona. The area of Pedernales has some of the most arid lands in the country. It is formed by successive marine terraces. The lowest part of these is on the edge of the coast, less than 100 m s. n. m. (meters above sea level). As one moves away from the sea, the elevations grow to 400 m. Upon entering the north, the ground continues to rise up to the Sierra de Bahoruco. Mount Vincent, with an elevation of about 2046 m, is the highest point of the province.

The territory of Pedernales has several adjacent lands, such as Isla Beata, Isla Los Frailes, Alto Velo Island, and Cayo Piedra Negra making it a strategic place for fishermen. Historically it was considered important, as it served as an orientation for Spanish and French ships during the colonial era that wanted to reach the Western expanse of the island. In addition, its natural conditions allow the nesting of seabirds and other endemic species.

== History ==
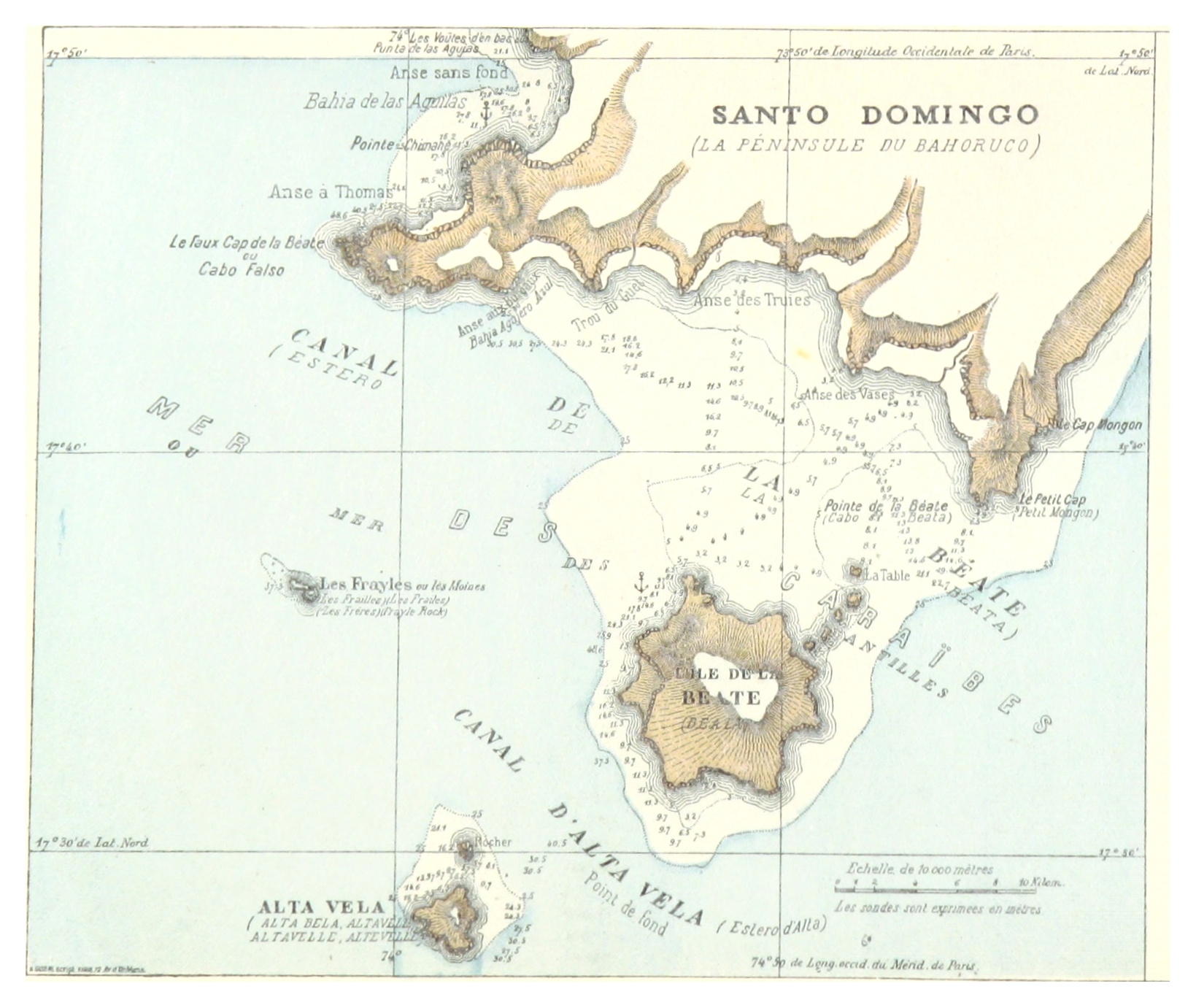
Historical map of Pedernales area

The Taíno arrived in Hispaniola around the 8th century A.D. They lived from agriculture, fishing, hunting, and gathering fruits.

At that time, the island was divided into 5 chiefdoms or regions. The Province of Pedernales occupies the territory of what was previously the chiefdom of Jaragua. When the Spanish arrived, Cacique Bohechío was the head of this chiefdom. The inhabitants of this land were characterized by their rebellion, since they were against the oppression that the Spanish subjected them. During the sixteenth century, this land was a refuge for the chief Enriquillo, a Taíno prince, as he was rebelling.

In 1493, Christopher Columbus discovered Beata Island, and considered it a strategic point for ships, due to its geographical location. This attracted several people who later settled on the shores of the island. The Spanish also kept cattle on the island for the new maritime expeditions. When Hispaniola was divided into a French and a Spanish colony, the Pedernales River was set as a border limit. From 1844, until the signing of the territorial division treaty (1929-1936), there were several incidents and border conflicts in the Enriquillo and Pedernales region. In 1867, the island of Alto Velo was granted to a North American company. Salt extraction was also started in the Beata lagoons.

The settlement of Pedernales began in 1927, during the government of Horacio Vásquez. It was included in the border colonization plan, which aimed to integrate the area with the rest of the country.

Its first administrator was Socrates Nolasco, appointed on April 13, 1927, by Rafael Espaillat, Minister of Agriculture and Immigration (a descendant of Ulises Francisco Espaillat). He was in charge of coordinating the construction of the first town of Pedernales. Pedernales was created on December 16, 1957.

== Economy and population ==
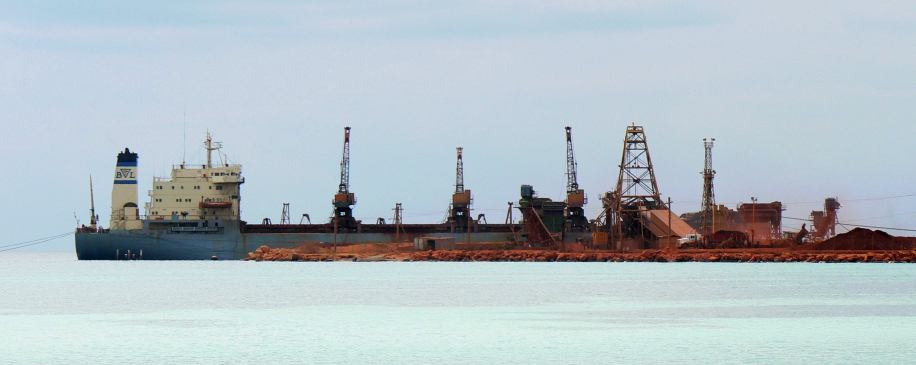
Bauxite mining in Cabo Rojo

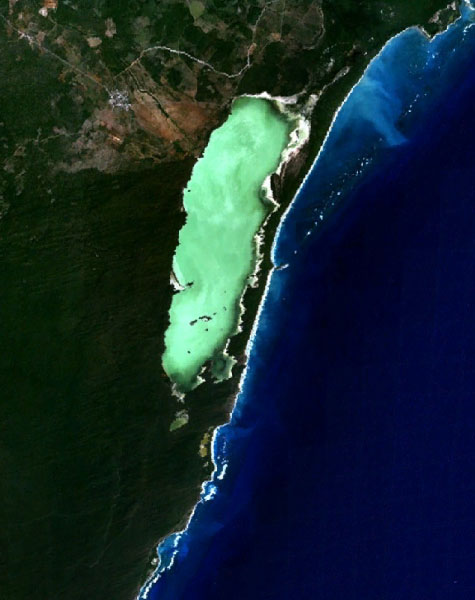
Lago de Oviedo in Jaragua National Park

The main activity in the province is currently agriculture, producing coffee and beef cattle. Fishing is also an important activity, being one of the provinces with the highest catch of fish and lobsters. Limestone mining in Cabo Rojo is also important.

The number of farms in the province amounts to a total of 1,128, which represents only 0.004% of the total number of farms in the country, though relatively arid Pedernales has some areas where the land can be very fertile, mainly based on irrigation canals. This has allowed the cultivation of products such as cotton, beans, peanuts, bananas, cassava, coffee, corn, tobacco, coconut, among others.

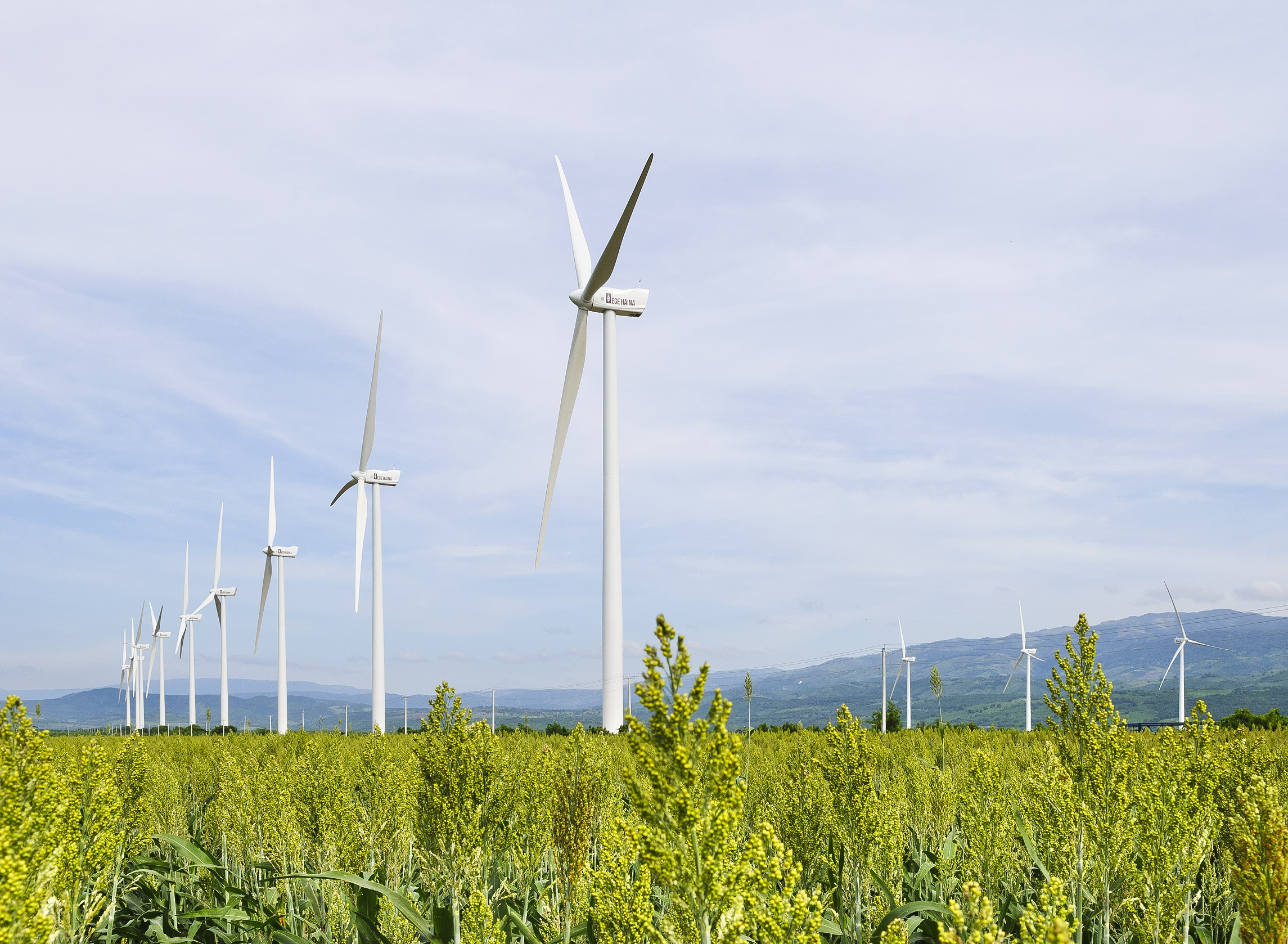
Juancho, Pedernales wind farm

According to statistical data, Pedernales is the least densely populated province in the Dominican Republic. For 2010, the total population reached 31,587 people: 16,895 men and 14,692 women, with a density of 15.7 inhabitants / km^{2} (inhabitants per square kilometer). The predominant ethnic groups are 78% mulatto or mestizo, 13% black and 9% white.

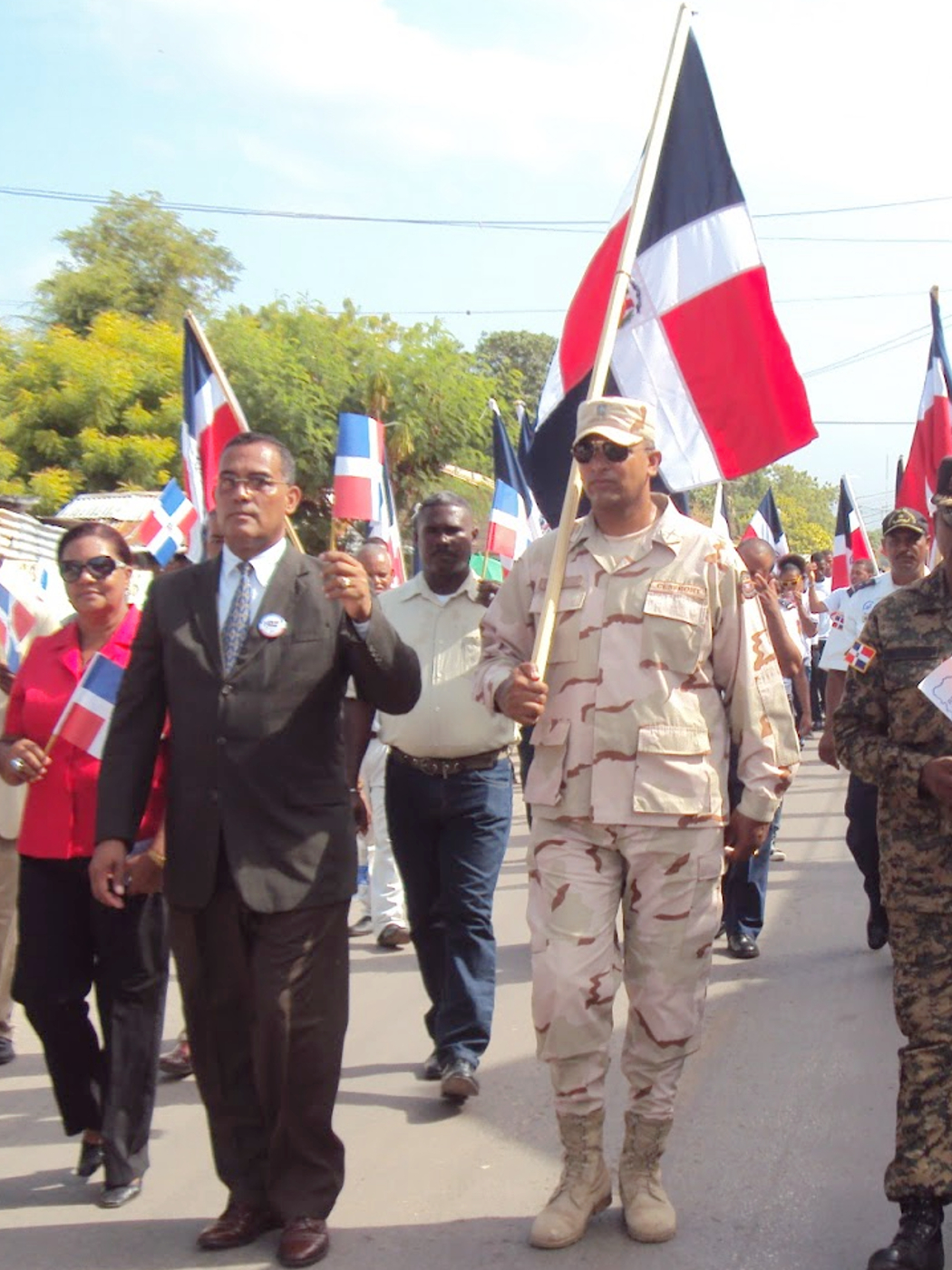
Pedernales, Dominican Republic border area

Until 1927, before the Rafael Trujillo regime, the area was inhabited almost entirely by Haitians. Together with the founding of the province, the government imposed measures to raise the Dominican population, stop the Haitian migration, and integrate the province more into the rest of the country.

In 2024 a major cruise ship port was opened at Cabo Rojo, and it is expected that a number of big resorts will be built in the area. This development is expected to substantially change the economy of the southwest part of the Dominican Republic. New road development will make travel to this area easier as well. However there are concerns that the natural character of the region will be heavily impacted, with the wildlife in the national park at particular risk.

== Municipalities and municipal districts ==
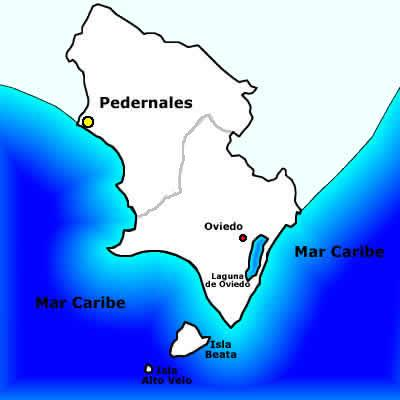
Municipalities of Pedernales Province

The province as of June 20, 2006 is divided into the following municipalities (municipios) and municipal districts (distrito municipal - M.D.) within them:

- Pedernales, head municipality of the province
  - José Francisco Peña Gómez (M.D.)
- Oviedo
  - Juancho (M.D.)

The following is a sortable table of the municipalities and municipal districts with population figures as of the 2012 census. Urban population are those living in the seats (cabeceras literally heads) of municipalities or of municipal districts. Rural population are those living in the districts (Secciones literally sections) and neighborhoods (Parajes literally places) outside of them.

For comparison with the municipalities and municipal districts of other provinces see the list of municipalities and municipal districts of the Dominican Republic.

| Name | Total population | Urban population | Rural population |
|---|---|---|---|
| Oviedo | 10,986 | 3,699 | 7,287 |
| Pedernales | 27,955 | 16,967 | 10,988 |
| Pedernales province | 38,941 | 20,666 | 18,275 |
