= Argyrotaenia subcordillerae =

Scientific classification
- Domain: Eukaryota
- Kingdom: Animalia
- Phylum: Arthropoda
- Class: Insecta
- Order: Lepidoptera
- Family: Tortricidae
- Genus: Argyrotaenia
- Species: A. subcordillerae

Binomial name
- Argyrotaenia subcordillerae Razowski & Wojtusiak, 2008

Species of moth

Argyrotaenia subcordillerae is a species of moth of the family Tortricidae. It is found in Ecuador in the provinces of Carchi and Pastaza.

The wingspan is 18.5–21 mm.

== Etymology ==
The species name refers to the similarity with Argyrotaenia cordillerae plus Latin sub (meaning near, close).
