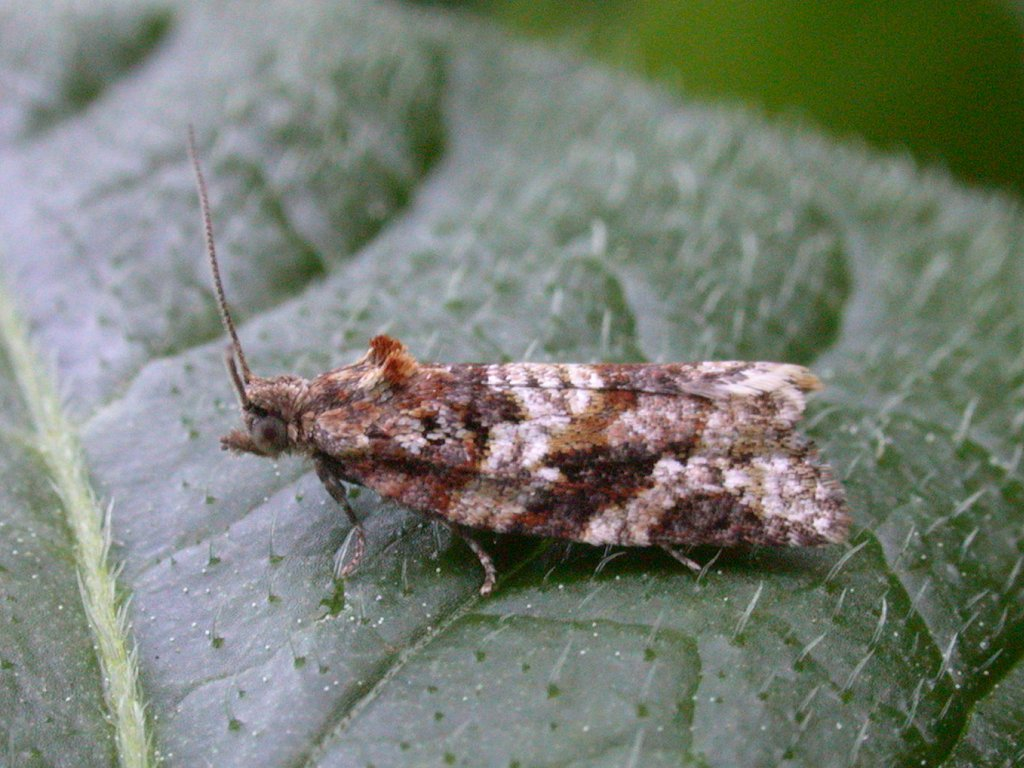
- Argyrotaenia ljungiana (Tortricidae)

Scientific classification
- Kingdom: Animalia
- Phylum: Arthropoda
- Clade: Pancrustacea
- Class: Insecta
- Order: Lepidoptera
- Family: Tortricidae
- Tribe: Archipini
- Genus: Argyrotaenia; Stephens, 1852

Synonyms
- Subargyrotaenia Obraztsov, 1961

= Argyrotaenia =

Genus of tortrix moths

Argyrotaenia is a genus of moths in the tribe Archipini within the family Tortricidae.

== Species ==
- Argyrotaenia albosignata Razowski & Becker, 2000
- Argyrotaenia alisellana (Robinson, 1869)
- Argyrotaenia altera Razowski & Wojtusiak, 2008
- Argyrotaenia amatana (Dyar, 1901)
- Argyrotaenia artocopa (Meyrick, 1932)
- Argyrotaenia atima (Walsingham, 1914)
- Argyrotaenia atrata Razowski & Wojtusiak, 2009
- Argyrotaenia bialbistriata Brown & Cramer, 2000
- Argyrotaenia bisignata Razowski, 1999
- Argyrotaenia brimuncus Razowski & Becker, 2000
- Argyrotaenia burnsorum Powell, 1960
- Argyrotaenia burroughsi Obraztsov, 1961
- Argyrotaenia cacaoticaria (Razowski & Wojtusiak, 2006)
- Argyrotaenia ceramica Razowski, 1999
- Argyrotaenia chiapasi Razowski & Becker, 2010
- Argyrotaenia chillana Razowski, 1999
- Argyrotaenia chroeca Razowski & Becker, 2000
- Argyrotaenia cibdela Razowski, 1988
- Argyrotaenia citharexylana (Zeller, 1866)
- Argyrotaenia coconinana Brown & Cramer, 2000
- Argyrotaenia coloradanus (Fernald, 1882)
- Argyrotaenia confinis Razowski & Becker, 2000
- Argyrotaenia cordillerae Razowski & Wojtusiak, 2006
- Argyrotaenia cubae Razowski & Becker, 2010
- Argyrotaenia cupreographa Razowski & Becker, 2000
- Argyrotaenia cupressae Powell, 1960
- Argyrotaenia dearmata Razowski & Becker, 2000
- Argyrotaenia dichotoma (Walsingham, 1914)
- Argyrotaenia dichroaca (Walsingham, 1914)
- Argyrotaenia dispositana (Zeller, 1877)
- Argyrotaenia dorsalana (Dyar, 1903)
- Argyrotaenia felisana Razowski, 1999
- Argyrotaenia ferruginea Razowski & Wojtusiak, 2006
- Argyrotaenia flavoreticulana Austin & Dombroskie, 2019
- Argyrotaenia floridana Obraztsov, 1961
- Argyrotaenia fortis Razowski & Becker, 2000
- Argyrotaenia fragosa Razowski & Becker, 2000
- Argyrotaenia franciscana (Walsingham, 1879)
- Argyrotaenia glabra Razowski & Becker, 2000
- Argyrotaenia gogana (Kearfott, 1907)
- Argyrotaenia graceana Powell, 1960
- Argyrotaenia granpiedrae Razowski & Becker, 2010
- Argyrotaenia graviduncus Razowski & Wojtusiak, 2010
- Argyrotaenia griseina Razowski & Wojtusiak, 2010
- Argyrotaenia guatemalica (Walsingham, 1914)
- Argyrotaenia haemothicta (Meyrick, 1926)
- Argyrotaenia hemixia Razowski, 1991
- Argyrotaenia heureta (Walsingham, 1914)
- Argyrotaenia hodgesi Heppner, 1989
- Argyrotaenia interfasciae Razowski & Wojtusiak, 2010
- Argyrotaenia iopsamma (Meyrick, 1931)
- Argyrotaenia isolatissima Powell, 1964
- Argyrotaenia ivana (Fernald, 1901)
- Argyrotaenia jamaicana Razowski & Becker, 2000
- Argyrotaenia juglandana (Fernald, 1879)
- Argyrotaenia kimballi Obraztsov, 1961
- Argyrotaenia klotsi Obraztsov, 1961
- Argyrotaenia lautana Powell, 1960
- Argyrotaenia levidensa Razowski, 1991
- Argyrotaenia lignea (Meyrick, 1917)
- Argyrotaenia lignitaenia Powell, 1965
- Argyrotaenia ljungiana (Thunberg, 1797)
- Argyrotaenia lobata Razowski, 1988
- Argyrotaenia lojalojae Razowski & Becker, 2010
- Argyrotaenia loxonephes (Meyrick, 1937)
- Argyrotaenia magnuncus Razowski & Wojtusiak, 2008
- Argyrotaenia mariana (Fernald, 1882)
- Argyrotaenia martini Powell, 1960
- Argyrotaenia mesosignaria Razowski, 1999
- Argyrotaenia minisignaria Razowski, 1999
- Argyrotaenia montezumae (Walsingham, 1914)
- Argyrotaenia neibana Razowski, 1999
- Argyrotaenia nigrorbis Razowski & Wojtusiak, 2010
- Argyrotaenia niscana (Kearfott, 1907)
- Argyrotaenia nuezana Razowski, 1999
- Argyrotaenia obvoluta Razowski & Becker, 2000
- Argyrotaenia occultana Freeman, 1942
- Argyrotaenia ochrochroa Razowski, 1999
- Argyrotaenia octavana Brown & Cramer, 2000
- Argyrotaenia oligachthes (Meyrick, 1932)
- Argyrotaenia onorei Razowski & Pelz, 2004
- Argyrotaenia oriphanes (Meyrick, 1930)
- Argyrotaenia paiuteana Powell, 1960
- Argyrotaenia parturita Razowski & Becker, 2000
- Argyrotaenia pilalona Razowski & Wojtusiak, 2008
- Argyrotaenia pinatubana (Kearfott, 1905)
- Argyrotaenia polvosana Obraztsov, 1961
- Argyrotaenia pomililiana Trematerra & Brown, 2004
- Argyrotaenia ponera (Walsingham, 1914)
- Argyrotaenia posticicnephaea Razowski & Wojtusiak, 2009
- Argyrotaenia posticirosea Razowski & Wojtusiak, 2010
- Argyrotaenia potosiana Razowski & Becker, 2010
- Argyrotaenia provana (Kearfott, 1907)
- Argyrotaenia purata (Meyrick, 1932)
- Argyrotaenia quadrifasciana (Fernald, 1882)
- Argyrotaenia quercifoliana Fitch, 1858
- Argyrotaenia repertana Freeman, 1944
- Argyrotaenia rufina Razowski & Wojtusiak, 2010
- Argyrotaenia rufescens Razowski & Wojtusiak, 2009
- Argyrotaenia sagata Razowski & Becker, 2000
- Argyrotaenia santacatarinae Razowski & Becker, 2010
- Argyrotaenia scotina Razowski & Pelz, 2004
- Argyrotaenia spaldingiana Obraztsov, 1961
- Argyrotaenia sphaleropa (Meyrick, 1909)
- Argyrotaenia spinacallis Brown & Cramer, 2000
- Argyrotaenia subcordillerae Razowski & Wojtusiak, 2008
- Argyrotaenia tabulana Freeman, 1944
- Argyrotaenia telemacana Razowski & Becker, 2010
- Argyrotaenia tenuis Razowski & Wojtusiak, 2008
- Argyrotaenia thamaluncus Razowski, 1999
- Argyrotaenia tristriata (Meyrick, 1931)
- Argyrotaenia tucumana Trematerra & Brown, 2004
- Argyrotaenia unda Brown & Cramer, 2000
- Argyrotaenia urbana (Busck, 1912)
- Argyrotaenia velutinana (Walker, 1863)
- Argyrotaenia venezuelana (Walker, 1863)
- Argyrotaenia vinalesiae Razowski & Becker, 2010

== See also ==
- List of Tortricidae genera
