= Argyrotaenia tucumana =

Scientific classification
- Domain: Eukaryota
- Kingdom: Animalia
- Phylum: Arthropoda
- Class: Insecta
- Order: Lepidoptera
- Family: Tortricidae
- Genus: Argyrotaenia
- Species: A. tucumana

Binomial name
- Argyrotaenia tucumana Trematerra & Brown, 2004

Species of moth

Argyrotaenia tucumana is a species of moth of the family Tortricidae. It is found in Tucumán Province, Argentina.

The length of the forewings is 5.1-7.1 mm for males and about 8 mm for females. Adults have been recorded on wing in February.

== Etymology ==
The species name refers to the type locality, Tucumán Province.
