= Argyrotaenia gogana =

Scientific classification
- Domain: Eukaryota
- Kingdom: Animalia
- Phylum: Arthropoda
- Class: Insecta
- Order: Lepidoptera
- Family: Tortricidae
- Genus: Argyrotaenia
- Species: A. gogana

Binomial name
- Argyrotaenia gogana (Kearfott, 1907)

Synonyms
- Olethreutes gogana Kearfott, 1907; Olethreutes crepuscularis Meyrick, 1912

Species of moth

Argyrotaenia gogana is a species of moth of the family Tortricidae. It is found in North America, where it has been recorded from British Columbia, Nevada and Washington.

Adults have been recorded on wing in April and from June to July.
