= Argyrotaenia chillana =

Scientific classification
- Domain: Eukaryota
- Kingdom: Animalia
- Phylum: Arthropoda
- Class: Insecta
- Order: Lepidoptera
- Family: Tortricidae
- Genus: Argyrotaenia
- Species: A. chillana

Binomial name
- Argyrotaenia chillana Razowski, 1999

Species of moth

Argyrotaenia chillana is a species of moth of the family Tortricidae. It is found in Ecuador.
