= Argyrotaenia lojalojae =

Scientific classification
- Kingdom: Animalia
- Phylum: Arthropoda
- Clade: Pancrustacea
- Class: Insecta
- Order: Lepidoptera
- Family: Tortricidae
- Genus: Argyrotaenia
- Species: A. lojalojae

Binomial name
- Argyrotaenia lojalojae Razowski & Becker, 2010

Species of moth

Argyrotaenia lojalojae is a species of moth of the family Tortricidae. It is found in Loja Province, Ecuador.

The wingspan is about 18 mm.

== Etymology ==
The species name refers to the type locality and the name of the province.
