= Argyrotaenia unda =

Scientific classification
- Domain: Eukaryota
- Kingdom: Animalia
- Phylum: Arthropoda
- Class: Insecta
- Order: Lepidoptera
- Family: Tortricidae
- Genus: Argyrotaenia
- Species: A. unda

Binomial name
- Argyrotaenia unda Brown & Cramer, 2000

Species of moth

Argyrotaenia unda is a species of moth of the family Tortricidae. It is found in Mexico (Morelos and the State of Mexico).

The length of the forewings is 9–10 mm for males and females.

== Etymology ==
The species name is derived from Latin unda (meaning wave).
