= Argyrotaenia lignea =

Scientific classification
- Kingdom: Animalia
- Phylum: Arthropoda
- Class: Insecta
- Order: Lepidoptera
- Family: Tortricidae
- Genus: Argyrotaenia
- Species: A. lignea

Binomial name
- Argyrotaenia lignea (Meyrick, 1917)

Synonyms
- Tortrix lignea Meyrick, 1917; Argyrotaenia lignaea Razowski & Becker, 2000

Species of moth

Argyrotaenia lignea is a species of moth of the family Tortricidae. It is found in Chimborazo Province, Ecuador.
