= Argyrotaenia dichroaca =

Scientific classification
- Domain: Eukaryota
- Kingdom: Animalia
- Phylum: Arthropoda
- Class: Insecta
- Order: Lepidoptera
- Family: Tortricidae
- Genus: Argyrotaenia
- Species: A. dichroaca

Binomial name
- Argyrotaenia dichroaca (Walsingham, 1914)

Synonyms
- Tortrix dichroaca Walsingham, 1914

Species of moth

Argyrotaenia dichroaca is a species of moth of the family Tortricidae. It is found in Costa Rica and Mexico (Guerrero, Federal District).
