= Argyrotaenia ponera =

Scientific classification
- Domain: Eukaryota
- Kingdom: Animalia
- Phylum: Arthropoda
- Class: Insecta
- Order: Lepidoptera
- Family: Tortricidae
- Genus: Argyrotaenia
- Species: A. ponera

Binomial name
- Argyrotaenia ponera (Walsingham, 1914)

Synonyms
- Tortrix ponera Walsingham, 1914

Species of moth

Argyrotaenia ponera is a species of moth of the family Tortricidae. It is found in Puebla, Mexico.

The length of the forewings is 11–13 mm.
