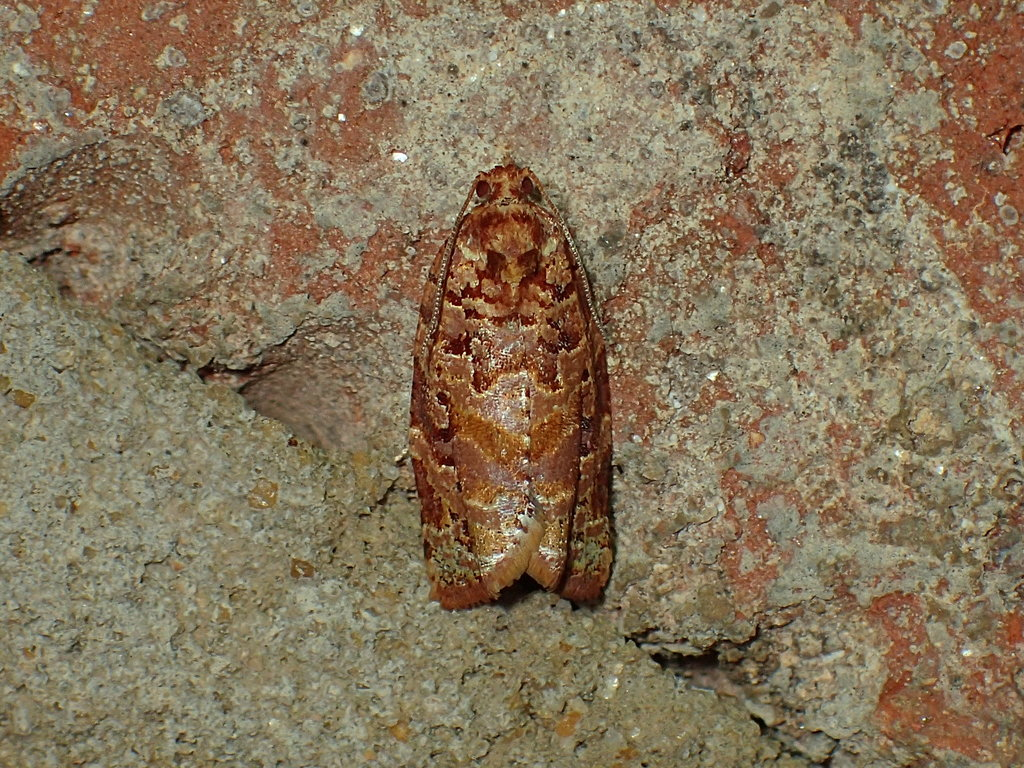

Scientific classification
- Kingdom: Animalia
- Phylum: Arthropoda
- Clade: Pancrustacea
- Class: Insecta
- Order: Lepidoptera
- Family: Tortricidae
- Genus: Argyrotaenia
- Species: A. floridana

Binomial name
- Argyrotaenia floridana Obraztsov, 1961

= Argyrotaenia floridana =

Species of moth

Argyrotaenia floridana is a species of moth of the family Tortricidae. It is found in the United States, where it has been recorded from Alabama, Arkansas, Florida, Kentucky, Louisiana, Maryland, Mississippi, New Jersey, North Carolina, Ohio, South Carolina, Tennessee, and Texas.

The length of the forewings is 5.5 mm for males and 7.5–9 mm for females. Adults have been recorded on wing year-round.
