= Argyrotaenia altera =

Scientific classification
- Kingdom: Animalia
- Phylum: Arthropoda
- Clade: Pancrustacea
- Class: Insecta
- Order: Lepidoptera
- Family: Tortricidae
- Genus: Argyrotaenia
- Species: A. altera

Binomial name
- Argyrotaenia altera Razowski & Wojtusiak, 2008

Species of moth

Argyrotaenia altera is a species of moth of the family Tortricidae. It is found in Carchi Province, Ecuador.

The wingspan is about 14 mm (0.55 in).
