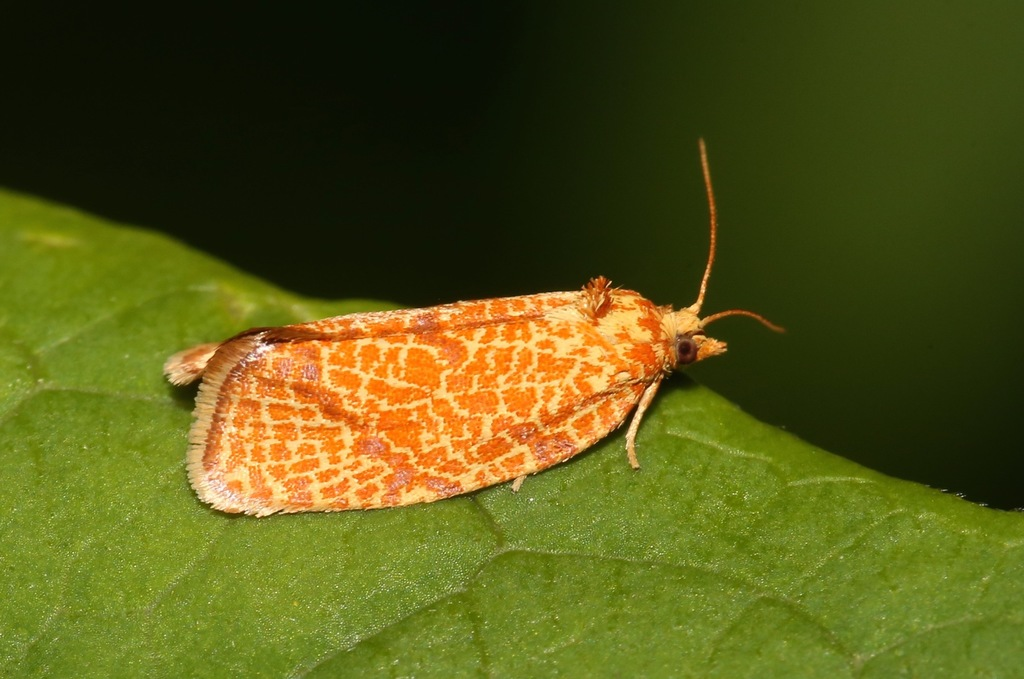

Scientific classification
- Kingdom: Animalia
- Phylum: Arthropoda
- Clade: Pancrustacea
- Class: Insecta
- Order: Lepidoptera
- Family: Tortricidae
- Genus: Argyrotaenia
- Species: A. quadrifasciana

Binomial name
- Argyrotaenia quadrifasciana (Fernald, 1882)

Synonyms
- Lophoderus quadrifasciana Fernald, 1882

= Argyrotaenia quadrifasciana =

Species of moth

Argyrotaenia quadrifasciana, the four-lined leafroller moth, four-banded leafroller or lesser all-green leafroller, is a species of moth of the family Tortricidae. It is found in North America, where it has been recorded from Nova Scotia to West Virginia, west to Arkansas and north to Alberta. The habitat consists of orchards and shrubby areas.

The wingspan is about 14–17 mm. Adults have been recorded on wing from May to August in one generation per year.

The larvae feed on the leaves of Amelanchier species (including Amelanchier alnifolia), Crataegus species, Malus sylvestris, Prunus species (including Prunus pensylvanica, Prunus serotina, Prunus virginiana) and Pyrus species. The species overwinters as a third-instar larva.
