= Argyrotaenia onorei =

Scientific classification
- Kingdom: Animalia
- Phylum: Arthropoda
- Class: Insecta
- Order: Lepidoptera
- Family: Tortricidae
- Genus: Argyrotaenia
- Species: A. onorei

Binomial name
- Argyrotaenia onorei Razowski & Pelz, 2004

Species of moth

Argyrotaenia onorei is a species of moth of the family Tortricidae. It is found in Ecuador in the provinces of Napo, Zamora-Chinchipe and Morona-Santiago.
