= Argyrotaenia pilalona =

Scientific classification
- Kingdom: Animalia
- Phylum: Arthropoda
- Clade: Pancrustacea
- Class: Insecta
- Order: Lepidoptera
- Family: Tortricidae
- Genus: Argyrotaenia
- Species: A. pilalona

Binomial name
- Argyrotaenia pilalona Razowski & Wojtusiak, 2008

Species of moth

Argyrotaenia pilalona is a species of moth of the family Tortricidae. It is found in Ecuador in the provinces of Cotopaxi, Napo, Pichincha and Morona-Santiago.

The wingspan is about 18.5 mm (0.73 in).

== Etymology ==
The species name refers to Pilaló, the type locality.
