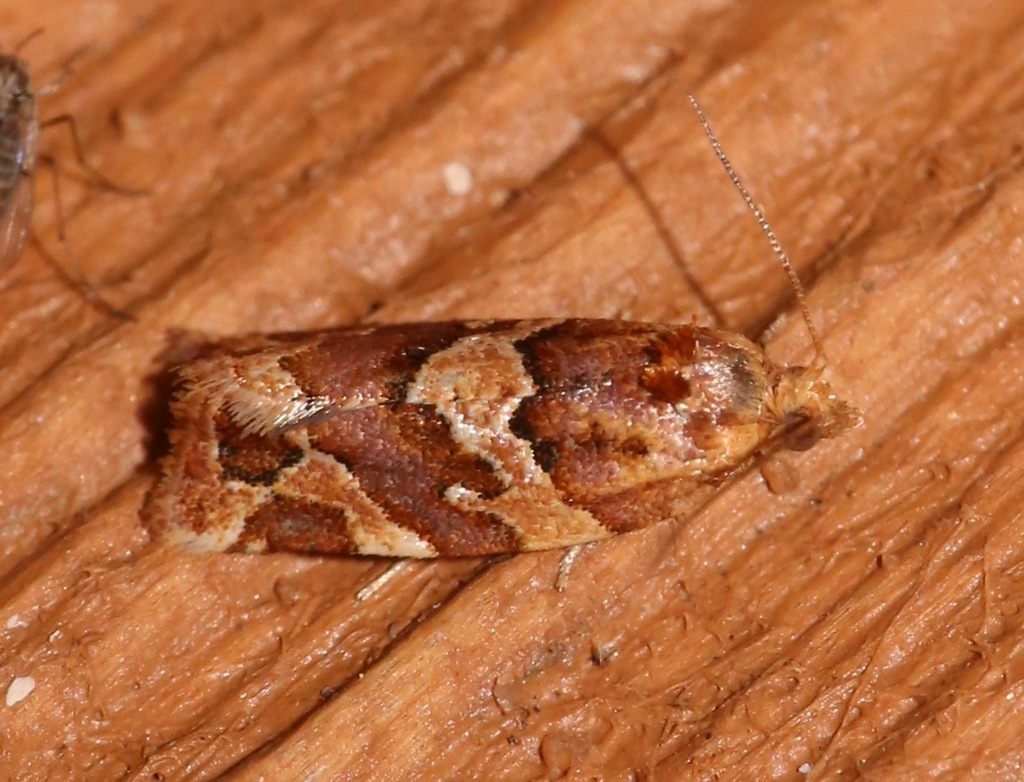

Scientific classification
- Kingdom: Animalia
- Phylum: Arthropoda
- Clade: Pancrustacea
- Class: Insecta
- Order: Lepidoptera
- Family: Tortricidae
- Genus: Argyrotaenia
- Species: A. hodgesi

Binomial name
- Argyrotaenia hodgesi Heppner, 1989

= Argyrotaenia hodgesi =

Species of moth

Argyrotaenia hodgesi is a species of moth of the family Tortricidae. It is found in the United States, where it has been recorded from Alabama, Florida, Louisiana, Maryland, Mississippi, South Carolina and Texas.

The length of the forewings is about 5.4 mm for males and 6.4 mm for females. Adults have been recorded on wing in July and August.
