= Argyrotaenia nuezana =

Scientific classification
- Kingdom: Animalia
- Phylum: Arthropoda
- Clade: Pancrustacea
- Class: Insecta
- Order: Lepidoptera
- Family: Tortricidae
- Genus: Argyrotaenia
- Species: A. nuezana

Binomial name
- Argyrotaenia nuezana Razowski, 1999

Species of moth

Argyrotaenia nuezana is a species of moth of the family Tortricidae. Adults of the species have a forewing length of 8.5–10.5 mm (0.33–0.41 in) and a wingspan of 18–20 mm (0.71–0.79 in). It is endemic to the Dominican Republic; it has a distribution centered around the Loma Alto de la Bandera mountain in the country's Cordillera Central. The moth inhabits pine forests, grasslands, humid montane forests, and mesic forests at elevations of 1,870–2,310 m (6,000–8,000 ft).

== Taxonomy ==
Argyrotaenia nuezana was formally described by the Polish entomologist Józef Razowski in 1999 based on a male collected from the La Vega Province in the Dominican Republic. A. nuezana is most closely related to a group of Argyrotaenia species native to Hispaniola, comprising A. bisignata, A. cryptica, A. felisana, A. paradisei, and A. razowskiana.

== Description ==
Argyrotaenia nuezana has an appearance that is fairly typical for members of its genus. Adults of the species have a forewing length of 8.5–10.5 mm (0.33–0.41 in) and a wingspan of 18–20 mm (0.71–0.79 in). The head is generally fuscous in color. There is a distinctive L-shaped maculation on its forewing that runs along the inside edge of the median fascia and cuts across it at around two-thirds of the way through.

== Distribution and habitat ==
Argyrotaenia nuezana has to-date only been recorded from the Dominican Republic, where it has a distribution centered around the Loma Alto de la Bandera mountain in the country's Cordillera Central. It occurs in the La Vega and San José de Ocoa provinces around the mountain and is thought to have a distribution limited to this region. The moth inhabits pine forests, grasslands, humid montane forests, and mesic forests at elevations of 1,870–2,310 m (6,000–8,000 ft). The dates on which it has been collected suggest that multiple generations of moths are born annually. The species is thought to feed on pines as a caterpillar.
