= Argyrotaenia sphaleropa =

Scientific classification
- Kingdom: Animalia
- Phylum: Arthropoda
- Class: Insecta
- Order: Lepidoptera
- Family: Tortricidae
- Genus: Argyrotaenia
- Species: A. sphaleropa

Binomial name
- Argyrotaenia sphaleropa (Meyrick, 1909)

Synonyms
- Tortrix sphaleropa Meyrick, 1909; Eulia fletcheriella Khler, 1940

Species of moth

Argyrotaenia sphaleropa is a species of moth of the family Tortricidae. It is found in South America, where it has been recorded from Colombia, Bolivia, Brazil, Peru, Uruguay and Argentina.

The wingspan is about 15 mm for females and about 12 mm for males.

The larvae feed on Baccharis salicifolia, Citrus species, Cosmos species, Diospyros kaki, Medicago sativa, Mimosa diplotricha, Mentha sauveolens, Persea species, Hibiscus rosa-sinensis, Rapanea umbellata, Rosa species, Solanum bonariense, Lantana camara, Vitis species (including Vitis vinifera) and Mikania cordifolia.
