= Argyrotaenia bisignata =

Scientific classification
- Kingdom: Animalia
- Phylum: Arthropoda
- Clade: Pancrustacea
- Class: Insecta
- Order: Lepidoptera
- Family: Tortricidae
- Genus: Argyrotaenia
- Species: A. bisignata

Binomial name
- Argyrotaenia bisignata Razowski, 1999

Species of moth

Argyrotaenia bisignata is a species of moth of the family Tortricidae. Adults of the species have a forewing length of 7.0–8.5 mm (0.28–0.33 in) and a wingspan of 16–18 mm (0.63–0.71 in). They are broadly whitish and brown in coloration. It is endemic to the island of Hispaniola; it has only been documented from the Baoruco Mountain Range in the Dominican Republic so far, but probably also inhabits the Chaîne de la Selle mountain range across the border in Haiti. It is an inhabitant of cloud forests at elevations of 1,250–2,070 m (4,000–7,000 ft).

== Taxonomy ==
Argyrotaenia bisignata was formally described by the Polish entomologist Józef Razowski in 1999 based on a male collected from the northeastern Los Arroyos sector of the Sierra de Bahoruco National Park.

== Description ==
Argyrotaenia bisignata has an appearance that is fairly typical for members of its genus. Adults of the species have a forewing length of 7.0–8.5 mm (0.28–0.33 in) and a wingspan of 16–18 mm (0.63–0.71 in). The head is broadly light to ochre-brown in color, with a dark brown vertex marked with light yellow and reddish-brown scales. The antennae are dark brown towards the base and light yellow towards the tip. The portions of the thorax closer to the head are the same color as the latter, but the thorax turns cream-ochre to fuscous towards the other end. The forewing is whitish with gray to brown markings. The hindwing is light yellow-white basally and grayish-brown apically.

Argyrotaenia bisignata is extremely similar to A. felisana in its appearance and can only reliably be distinguished from that species by the appearance of its male genitalia and its range. Females can only be differentiated by their range or by the presence of conspecific males.

== Distribution and habitat ==
Argyrotaenia bisignata has to-date only been recorded from the Dominican Republic, where it is restricted to the Baoruco Mountain Range in Pedernales Province. It probably also occurs across the border in Haiti's Chaîne de la Selle mountain range. The moth inhabits cloud forests at elevations of 1,250–2,070 m (4,000–7,000 ft), but its ecology is otherwise poorly known.
