= Argyrotaenia burnsorum =

Scientific classification
- Kingdom: Animalia
- Phylum: Arthropoda
- Clade: Pancrustacea
- Class: Insecta
- Order: Lepidoptera
- Family: Tortricidae
- Genus: Argyrotaenia
- Species: A. burnsorum

Binomial name
- Argyrotaenia burnsorum Powell, 1960

Species of moth

Argyrotaenia burnsorum is a species of moth of the family Tortricidae. It is found in the United States, where it has been recorded from Texas.

The wingspan is about 19–20 mm. Adults have been recorded on wing from February to April.
