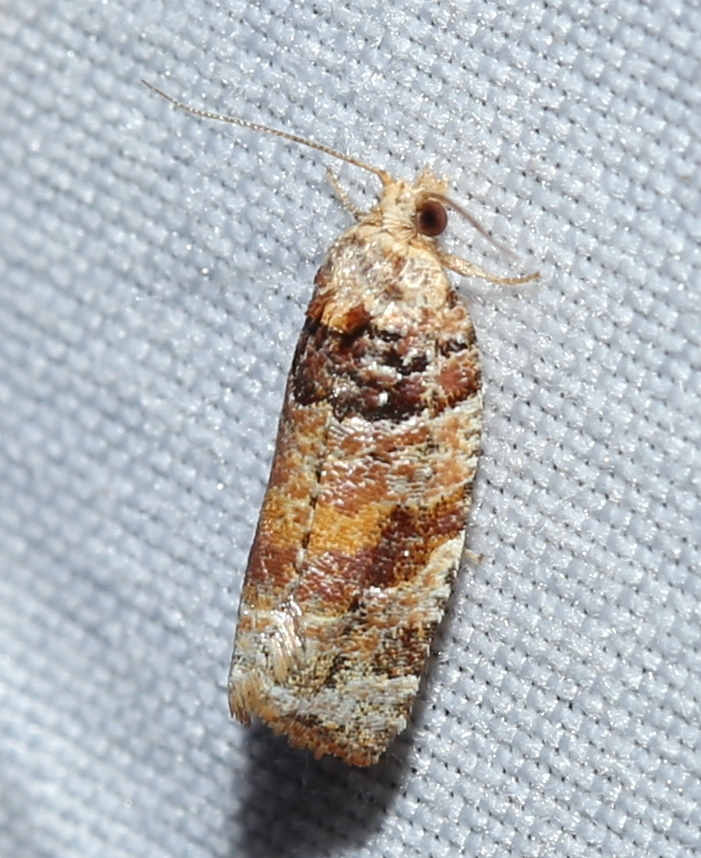

Scientific classification
- Kingdom: Animalia
- Phylum: Arthropoda
- Class: Insecta
- Order: Lepidoptera
- Family: Tortricidae
- Genus: Argyrotaenia
- Species: A. kimballi

Binomial name
- Argyrotaenia kimballi Obraztsov, 1961

= Argyrotaenia kimballi =

Species of moth

Argyrotaenia kimballi, Kimball's leafroller moth, is a species of moth of the family Tortricidae. It is found in the United States, where it has been recorded from Alabama, Florida, Louisiana, Maryland, Mississippi, North Carolina, South Carolina, Tennessee and Texas.

The wingspan is about 16–20 mm. Adults have been recorded on wing year round.

The larvae feed on Citrus species.
