= Argyrotaenia oriphanes =

Scientific classification
- Kingdom: Animalia
- Phylum: Arthropoda
- Class: Insecta
- Order: Lepidoptera
- Family: Tortricidae
- Genus: Argyrotaenia
- Species: A. oriphanes

Binomial name
- Argyrotaenia oriphanes (Meyrick, 1930)

Synonyms
- Tortrix oriphanes Meyrick, 1930

Species of moth

Argyrotaenia oriphanes is a species of moth of the family Tortricidae. It is found in Peru.
