= Argyrotaenia klotsi =

Scientific classification
- Domain: Eukaryota
- Kingdom: Animalia
- Phylum: Arthropoda
- Class: Insecta
- Order: Lepidoptera
- Family: Tortricidae
- Genus: Argyrotaenia
- Species: A. klotsi

Binomial name
- Argyrotaenia klotsi Obraztsov, 1961

Species of moth

Argyrotaenia klotsi is a species of moth of the family Tortricidae. It is found in the United States, where it has been recorded from Arizona, New Mexico and California.

The length of the forewings is 8–9.5 mm. Adults have been recorded on wing from July to August.
