= Argyrotaenia hemixia =

Scientific classification
- Kingdom: Animalia
- Phylum: Arthropoda
- Class: Insecta
- Order: Lepidoptera
- Family: Tortricidae
- Genus: Argyrotaenia
- Species: A. hemixia

Binomial name
- Argyrotaenia hemixia Razowski, 1991

Species of moth

Argyrotaenia hemixia is a species of moth of the family Tortricidae. It is found in Santa Catarina, Brazil.
