= Argyrotaenia magnuncus =

Scientific classification
- Kingdom: Animalia
- Phylum: Arthropoda
- Clade: Pancrustacea
- Class: Insecta
- Order: Lepidoptera
- Family: Tortricidae
- Genus: Argyrotaenia
- Species: A. magnuncus

Binomial name
- Argyrotaenia magnuncus Razowski & Wojtusiak, 2008

Species of moth

Argyrotaenia magnuncus is a species of moth of the family Tortricidae. It is found in Ecuador (Cotopaxi Province, Azuay Province).

The wingspan is about 17 mm (0.67 in).
