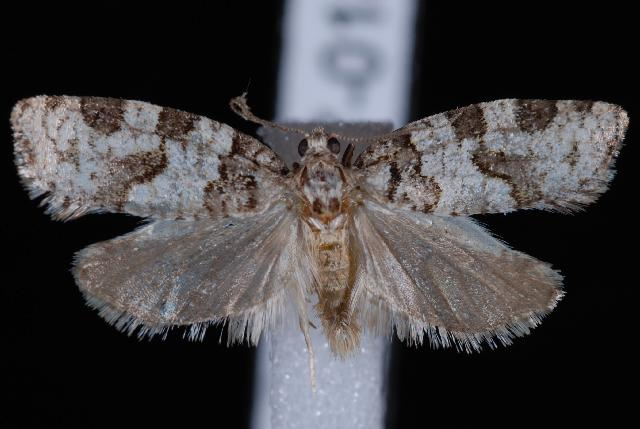

Scientific classification
- Kingdom: Animalia
- Phylum: Arthropoda
- Clade: Pancrustacea
- Class: Insecta
- Order: Lepidoptera
- Family: Tortricidae
- Genus: Argyrotaenia
- Species: A. provana

Binomial name
- Argyrotaenia provana (Kearfott, 1907)

Synonyms
- Olethreutes provana Kearfott, 1907; Tortrix invidana Barnes & Busck, 1920

= Argyrotaenia provana =

Species of moth

Argyrotaenia provana is a species of moth of the family Tortricidae. It is found in North America, where it has been recorded from Arizona, British Columbia, California, Colorado, New Mexico, Utah, Washington and Wyoming.

The wingspan is about 19 mm. Adults have been recorded on wing from June to October.

The larvae feed on Abies concolor, Abies magnifica and Pseudotsuga menziesii.
