= Argyrotaenia levidensa =

Scientific classification
- Kingdom: Animalia
- Phylum: Arthropoda
- Class: Insecta
- Order: Lepidoptera
- Family: Tortricidae
- Genus: Argyrotaenia
- Species: A. levidensa

Binomial name
- Argyrotaenia levidensa Razowski, 1991

Species of moth

Argyrotaenia levidensa is a species of moth of the family Tortricidae. It is found in Brazil (Nova Teutonia).
