= Argyrotaenia scotina =

Scientific classification
- Kingdom: Animalia
- Phylum: Arthropoda
- Class: Insecta
- Order: Lepidoptera
- Family: Tortricidae
- Genus: Argyrotaenia
- Species: A. scotina

Binomial name
- Argyrotaenia scotina Razowski & Pelz, 2004

Species of moth

Argyrotaenia scotina is a species of moth of the family Tortricidae. It is found in Morona-Santiago Province, Ecuador.
