= Argyrotaenia posticicnephaea =

Scientific classification
- Domain: Eukaryota
- Kingdom: Animalia
- Phylum: Arthropoda
- Class: Insecta
- Order: Lepidoptera
- Family: Tortricidae
- Genus: Argyrotaenia
- Species: A. posticicnephaea

Binomial name
- Argyrotaenia posticicnephaea Razowski & Wojtusiak, 2009

Species of moth

Argyrotaenia posticicnephaea is a species of moth of the family Tortricidae. It is found in Tungurahua Province, Ecuador. It is one of over 100 known members of the genus Argyrotaenia.

The wingspan is about 17 mm.
