= Argyrotaenia ivana =

Scientific classification
- Domain: Eukaryota
- Kingdom: Animalia
- Phylum: Arthropoda
- Class: Insecta
- Order: Lepidoptera
- Family: Tortricidae
- Genus: Argyrotaenia
- Species: A. ivana

Binomial name
- Argyrotaenia ivana (Fernald, 1901)

Synonyms
- Tortrix ivana Fernald, 1901

Species of moth

Argyrotaenia ivana, the Ivana leafroller moth, is a species of moth of the family Tortricidae. It is found in the United States, where it has been recorded from Alabama, Florida, Georgia, Louisiana, Maryland, Mississippi and Texas.

The wingspan is about 12–16 mm. Adults have been recorded on wing nearly year round.

The larvae feed on Acnida species, Amaranthus hybridus, Amaranthus spinosus, Apium species (including Apium graveolens), Galinsoga ciliata, Iva species (including Iva imbricata), Brassica oleracea, Commelina diffusa, Ipomoea batatas, Momordica charantia, Cyperus species, Medicago sativa, Vigna sinensis, Paspalum urvillei and Rosa odorata.
