= Argyrotaenia burroughsi =

Scientific classification
- Domain: Eukaryota
- Kingdom: Animalia
- Phylum: Arthropoda
- Class: Insecta
- Order: Lepidoptera
- Family: Tortricidae
- Genus: Argyrotaenia
- Species: A. burroughsi

Binomial name
- Argyrotaenia burroughsi Obraztsov, 1961

Species of moth

Argyrotaenia burroughsi is a species of moth of the family Tortricidae. It is found in the United States, where it has been recorded from Colorado, Arizona and New Mexico.

Adults have been recorded on wing in March and from July to August.
