= Argyrotaenia niscana =

Scientific classification
- Domain: Eukaryota
- Kingdom: Animalia
- Phylum: Arthropoda
- Class: Insecta
- Order: Lepidoptera
- Family: Tortricidae
- Genus: Argyrotaenia
- Species: A. niscana

Binomial name
- Argyrotaenia niscana (Kearfott, 1907)

Synonyms
- Eulia niscana Kearfott, 1907; Eulia camerata Meyrick, 1912

Species of moth

Argyrotaenia niscana is a species of moth of the family Tortricidae. It is found in the United States, where it has been recorded from California and Mississippi.

The wingspan is about 14–16 mm. Adults have been recorded on wing from March to June, in August and in October.

The larvae feed on Adenostoma species, including Adenostoma fasciculatum.
