= Argyrotaenia pomililiana =

Scientific classification
- Domain: Eukaryota
- Kingdom: Animalia
- Phylum: Arthropoda
- Class: Insecta
- Order: Lepidoptera
- Family: Tortricidae
- Genus: Argyrotaenia
- Species: A. pomililiana

Binomial name
- Argyrotaenia pomililiana Trematerra & Brown, 2004

Species of moth

Argyrotaenia pomililiana is a species of moth of the family Tortricidae. It is found in Argentina (Rio Negro, Buenos Aires).

The length of the forewings is 6.8–8.1 mm for males and 7.2–8.3 mm for females. Adults have been recorded on wing in February, July and December.

The larvae feed on the leaves and fruit of Malus species.
