= Claduncaria minisignaria =

Scientific classification
- Kingdom: Animalia
- Phylum: Arthropoda
- Clade: Pancrustacea
- Class: Insecta
- Order: Lepidoptera
- Family: Tortricidae
- Genus: Argyrotaenia
- Species: A. minisignaria

Binomial name
- Argyrotaenia minisignaria Razowski, 1999

Species of moth

Claduncaria minisignaria is a species of moth of the family Tortricidae. Adults of the species have a forewing length of 8.0–10.0 mm (0.31–0.39 in) and a wingspan of 19.5 mm (0.77 in). It has only been recorded from the Baoruco Mountain Range in the Dominican Republic, but probably also occurs in nearby areas of Haiti. The moth is known from elevations of 1,940 m (6,000 ft).

== Taxonomy ==
Claduncaria minisignaria was formally described as Argyrotaenia minisignaria by the Polish entomologist Józef Razowski in 1999 based on a female collected from northeastern Los Arroyos sector of the Sierra de Bahoruco National Park. In 2000, Razowski and Becker described A. m. chalarostium as a novel subspecies based on a female specimen from Jamaica. A 2020 review of the taxonomy of the Caribbean Archipini found that these two taxa were better treated as distinct species and raised chalarostium to species status. They additionally noted that Razowski had mistakenly identified a male specimen of A. minisignaria as belonging to A. mesosignaria. They moved A. minisignaria to the genus Claduncaria, alongside A. mesosignaria and A. chalarostium, based on the morphology of its male genitalia. C. minisignaria is most closely related to C. mesosignaria.

== Description ==
Claduncaria minisignaria has an appearance that is fairly typical for members of its genus. Adults of the species have a forewing length of 8.0–10.0 mm (0.31–0.39 in) and a wingspan of 19.5 mm (0.77 in).

== Distribution and habitat ==
Claduncaria minisignaria has to-date only been recorded from the Dominican Republic, where it is restricted to the Baoruco Mountain Range in Pedernales Province. It probably also occurs across the border in Haiti. The moth is known from elevations of 1,940 m (6,000 ft).
