= Argyrotaenia purata =

Scientific classification
- Kingdom: Animalia
- Phylum: Arthropoda
- Class: Insecta
- Order: Lepidoptera
- Family: Tortricidae
- Genus: Argyrotaenia
- Species: A. purata

Binomial name
- Argyrotaenia purata (Meyrick, 1932)

Synonyms
- Tortrix purata Meyrick, 1932; Subargyrotaenia purata

Species of moth

Argyrotaenia purata is a species of moth of the family Tortricidae. It is found in Costa Rica.
