= Argyrotaenia rufina =

Scientific classification
- Kingdom: Animalia
- Phylum: Arthropoda
- Class: Insecta
- Order: Lepidoptera
- Family: Tortricidae
- Genus: Argyrotaenia
- Species: A. rufina

Binomial name
- Argyrotaenia rufina Razowski & Wojtusiak, 2010

Species of moth

Argyrotaenia rufina is a species of moth of the family Tortricidae. It is known from the Yanachaga–Chemillén National Park in the Pasco Region, Peru. The holotype was collected at 2,460 m (8,070 ft) above sea level.

The wingspan is about 18.5 mm for the holotype, a male.
