= Argyrotaenia coconinana =

Scientific classification
- Kingdom: Animalia
- Phylum: Arthropoda
- Clade: Pancrustacea
- Class: Insecta
- Order: Lepidoptera
- Family: Tortricidae
- Genus: Argyrotaenia
- Species: A. coconinana

Binomial name
- Argyrotaenia coconinana Brown & Cramer, 2000

Species of moth

Argyrotaenia coconinana is a species of moth of the family Tortricidae. It is found in the United States, where it has been recorded from Colorado, Arizona and New Mexico.

The length of the forewings is 11–13 mm for males 11–12 mm for females. Adults have been recorded on wing in June and July.

== Etymology ==
The species name is derived from the county of Coconino in Arizona.
