= Argyrotaenia cupressae =

Scientific classification
- Kingdom: Animalia
- Phylum: Arthropoda
- Clade: Pancrustacea
- Class: Insecta
- Order: Lepidoptera
- Family: Tortricidae
- Genus: Argyrotaenia
- Species: A. cupressae

Binomial name
- Argyrotaenia cupressae Powell, 1960

Species of moth

Argyrotaenia cupressae is a species of moth of the family Tortricidae. It is found in the United States, where it has been recorded from California.

The wingspan is about 18–19 mm. Adults have been recorded on wing from May to September.

The larvae feed on Cupressus goveniana, Cupressus forbesii, Cupressus guadalupensis, Cupressus macrocarpa, Cupressus sargentii, Cupressus sempervirens, Juniperus californica and Sequoia sempervirens.

== Subspecies ==
- Argyrotaenia cupressae cupressae
- Argyrotaenia cupressae beyeria Powell, 1960 (California)
