= Argyrotaenia bialbistriata =

Scientific classification
- Domain: Eukaryota
- Kingdom: Animalia
- Phylum: Arthropoda
- Class: Insecta
- Order: Lepidoptera
- Family: Tortricidae
- Genus: Argyrotaenia
- Species: A. bialbistriata

Binomial name
- Argyrotaenia bialbistriata Brown & Cramer, 2000

Species of moth

Argyrotaenia bialbistriata is a species of moth of the family Tortricidae. It is found in the state of Durango in Mexico and Arizona in the United States.

The length of the forewings is 9.8–9.9 mm for males and 9.5–10 mm for females.
