= Argyrotaenia jamaicana =

Scientific classification
- Kingdom: Animalia
- Phylum: Arthropoda
- Clade: Pancrustacea
- Class: Insecta
- Order: Lepidoptera
- Family: Tortricidae
- Genus: Argyrotaenia
- Species: A. jamaicana

Binomial name
- Argyrotaenia jamaicana Razowski & Becker, 2000

Species of insect

Argyrotaenia jamaicana is a species of moth of the family Tortricidae. It is found in Jamaica.
