= Argyrotaenia santacatarinae =

Scientific classification
- Kingdom: Animalia
- Phylum: Arthropoda
- Clade: Pancrustacea
- Class: Insecta
- Order: Lepidoptera
- Family: Tortricidae
- Genus: Argyrotaenia
- Species: A. santacatarinae

Binomial name
- Argyrotaenia santacatarinae Razowski & Becker, 2010

Species of moth

Argyrotaenia santacatarinae is a species of moth of the family Tortricidae. It is found in Santa Catarina, Brazil.

The wingspan is 14–17 mm.
