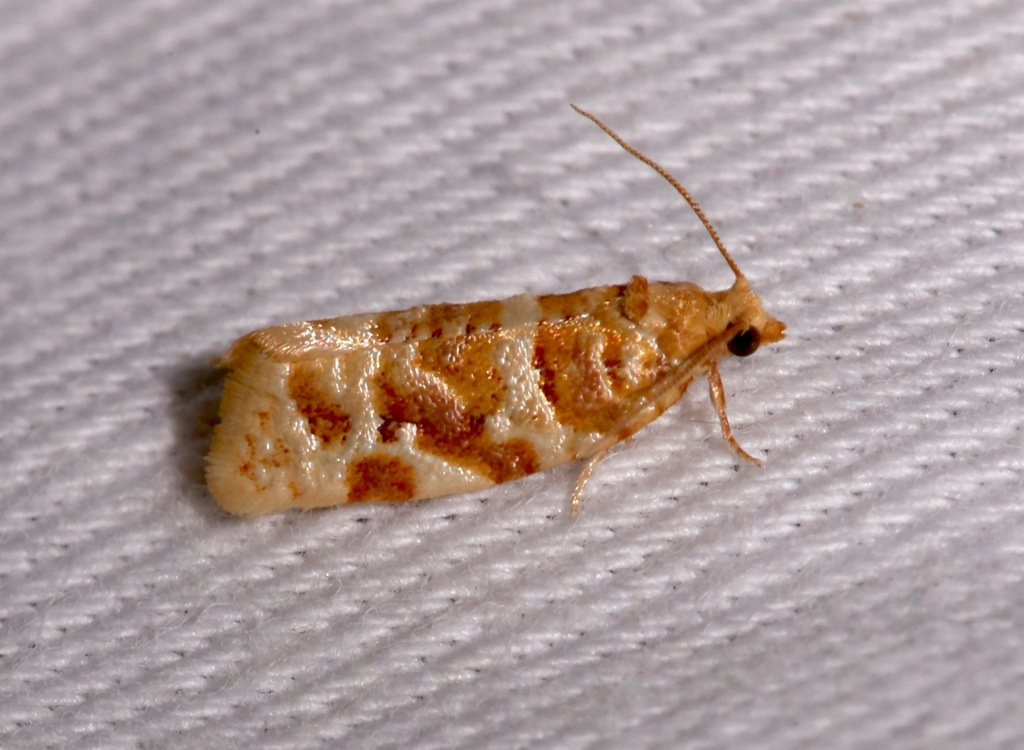

Scientific classification
- Kingdom: Animalia
- Phylum: Arthropoda
- Clade: Pancrustacea
- Class: Insecta
- Order: Lepidoptera
- Family: Tortricidae
- Genus: Argyrotaenia
- Species: A. paiuteana

Binomial name
- Argyrotaenia paiuteana Powell, 1960

= Argyrotaenia paiuteana =

Species of moth

Argyrotaenia paiuteana is a species of moth of the family Tortricidae. It is found in the United States, where it has been recorded from California.

The wingspan is about 15–19 mm. Adults have been recorded on wing from May to August.

The larvae feed on Pinus monophylla and Juniperus occidentalis.
