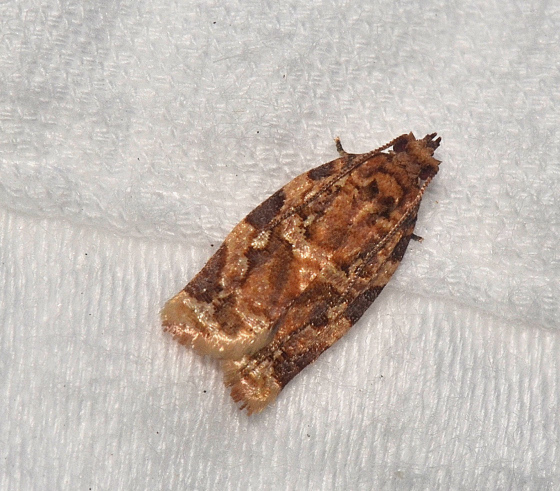

Scientific classification
- Kingdom: Animalia
- Phylum: Arthropoda
- Clade: Pancrustacea
- Class: Insecta
- Order: Lepidoptera
- Family: Tortricidae
- Genus: Argyrotaenia
- Species: A. amatana

Binomial name
- Argyrotaenia amatana (Dyar, 1901)

Synonyms
- Lophoderus amatana Dyar, 1901; Tortrix chioccana Kearfott, 1907; Argyrotoxa chiococcana Meyrick, in Wagner, 1912

= Argyrotaenia amatana =

Pondapple leafroller moth

Species of moth

Argyrotaenia amatana, the pondapple leafroller moth, is a species of moth of the family Tortricidae. It is found in the northern Caribbean and is known from Florida, The Bahamas, Turks and Caicos Islands, Cuba, the Dominican Republic, Jamaica, and the Cayman Islands.

== Taxonomy ==
Argyrotaenia amatana was formally described by the American entomologist Harrison Dyar, Jr. in 1901 based on female specimens from Palm Beach County, Florida. Populations from the Dominican Republic and the Turks & Caicos islands were formerly considered to be the distinct species Argyrotaenia neibana and Argyrotaenia ochrochroa, but these were synonymized with the present species in 2020.

== Description ==
The wingspan is 13–16 mm. Adults have been recorded nearly year round.

== Distribution and habitat ==
Argyrotaenia amatana is widely distributed in the northern Caribbean and is known from Florida, The Bahamas, Turks and Caicos Islands, Cuba, the Dominican Republic, Jamaica, and the Cayman Islands. It is one of few Caribbean Argyrotaenia species common is lowlands and is usually seen at elevations below 100 m (330 ft) along the coast. On Cuba and Hispaniola, it can be found at higher elevations, from 400–1,500 m (1,300–4,900 ft).

== Biology ==
The larvae feed on a wide range of plants, including Acer rubrum, Eupatorium incarnatum, Laguncularia racemosa, Lysimola bahamensis, Persea borbonica, Persea americana, Sagittaria falcata, Salix caroliniana, Taxodium distichum, Annona glabra, Eugenia species and Nectandra coriacea.
