= Argyrotaenia martini =

Scientific classification
- Kingdom: Animalia
- Phylum: Arthropoda
- Clade: Pancrustacea
- Class: Insecta
- Order: Lepidoptera
- Family: Tortricidae
- Genus: Argyrotaenia
- Species: A. martini

Binomial name
- Argyrotaenia martini Powell, 1960

Species of moth

Argyrotaenia martini is a species of moth of the family Tortricidae. It is found in the United States, where it has been recorded from Arizona.

The wingspan is about 19–20 mm. Adults have been recorded on wing from July to August.
