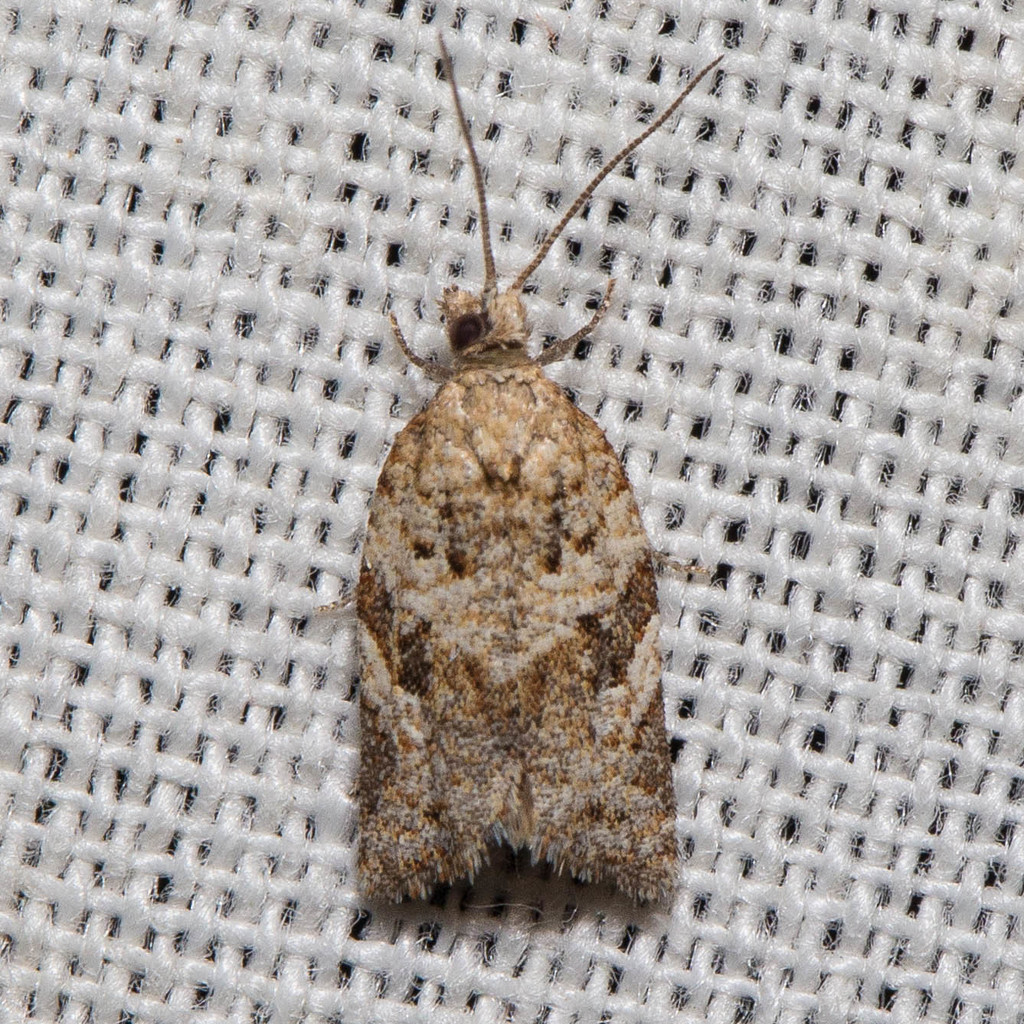

Scientific classification
- Kingdom: Animalia
- Phylum: Arthropoda
- Clade: Pancrustacea
- Class: Insecta
- Order: Lepidoptera
- Family: Tortricidae
- Genus: Argyrotaenia
- Species: A. isolatissima

Binomial name
- Argyrotaenia isolatissima Powell, 1964

= Argyrotaenia isolatissima =

Species of moth

Argyrotaenia isolatissima is a species of moth of the family Tortricidae. It is found in the United States, where it has been recorded from California.

Adults have been recorded on wing in May.

The larvae feed on Coreopsis species.
