= Argyrotaenia griseina =

Scientific classification
- Kingdom: Animalia
- Phylum: Arthropoda
- Class: Insecta
- Order: Lepidoptera
- Family: Tortricidae
- Genus: Argyrotaenia
- Species: A. griseina

Binomial name
- Argyrotaenia griseina Razowski & Wojtusiak, 2010

Species of moth

Argyrotaenia griseina is a species of moth of the family Tortricidae. It is known from Cordillera de Carpish (Department of Huánuco) and from Cordillera Vilcanota (Department of Cusco), Peru. The types were collected at 2,750–3,100 m (9,020–10,170 ft) above sea level.

The wingspan is about 20 mm in males.
