= Argyrotaenia lobata =

Scientific classification
- Kingdom: Animalia
- Phylum: Arthropoda
- Class: Insecta
- Order: Lepidoptera
- Family: Tortricidae
- Genus: Argyrotaenia
- Species: A. lobata

Binomial name
- Argyrotaenia lobata Razowski, 1988

Species of moth

Argyrotaenia lobata is a species of moth of the family Tortricidae. It is found in Bolivia.
