= Argyrotaenia vinalesiae =

Scientific classification
- Kingdom: Animalia
- Phylum: Arthropoda
- Clade: Pancrustacea
- Class: Insecta
- Order: Lepidoptera
- Family: Tortricidae
- Genus: Argyrotaenia
- Species: A. vinalesiae

Binomial name
- Argyrotaenia vinalesiae Razowski & Becker, 2010

Species of moth

Argyrotaenia vinalesiae is a species of moth of the family Tortricidae. Adults of the species have a forewing length of 4.5–5.0 mm (0.18–0.20 in). It is endemic to Cuba, where it has been recorded only from its type locality of Viñales in Pinar del Río. The species has orange-yellow to golden-yellow forewings and orange-yellow hindwings.

== Taxonomy ==
Argyrotaenia vinalesiae was formally described by the Polish entomologist Józef Razowski and the Brazilian entomologist Vitor Osmar Becker in 2010 based on a male specimen from Pinar del Río, Cuba. This holotype was initially incorrectly listed as being a female by Razowski and Becker, an error that was corrected in 2020. The species is named after its type locality, the municipality of Viñales.

== Description ==
Adults of the species have a forewing length of 4.5–5.0 mm (0.18–0.20 in). The scales on the vertex, frons, and labial palpus are golden-yellow to straw-yellow. The scape has similarly colored scales. The dorsal surface of the forewing is uniformly warm orange-yellow to golden-yellow. The dorsal surface of the hindwing is orange-yellow. The undersides of both wings are slightly paler than the dorsal surfaces.

Argyrotaenia vinalesiae is most similar in its morphology to A. amatana. It differs in its smaller size, uniformly-colored forewing, and shorter, broader signum in the female genitalia. The male genitalia of both species are indistinguishable.

== Distribution and habitat ==
Argyrotaenia vinalesiae is endemic to Cuba, where it has been recorded only from its type locality of Viñales in Pinar del Río. It is known from an elevation of 100 m (330 ft).
