= Argyrotaenia atrata =

Scientific classification
- Kingdom: Animalia
- Phylum: Arthropoda
- Class: Insecta
- Order: Lepidoptera
- Family: Tortricidae
- Genus: Argyrotaenia
- Species: A. atrata

Binomial name
- Argyrotaenia atrata Razowski & Wojtusiak, 2009

Species of moth

Argyrotaenia atrata is a species of moth of the family Tortricidae. It is found in Tungurahua Province, Ecuador.

The wingspan is about 21 mm.
