= Argyrotaenia heureta =

Scientific classification
- Domain: Eukaryota
- Kingdom: Animalia
- Phylum: Arthropoda
- Class: Insecta
- Order: Lepidoptera
- Family: Tortricidae
- Genus: Argyrotaenia
- Species: A. heureta

Binomial name
- Argyrotaenia heureta (Walsingham, 1914)

Synonyms
- Tortrix heureta Walsingham, 1914

Species of moth

Argyrotaenia heureta is a species of moth of the family Tortricidae. It is found in Guatemala and Puebla, Mexico.
