= Argyrotaenia rufescens =

Scientific classification
- Domain: Eukaryota
- Kingdom: Animalia
- Phylum: Arthropoda
- Class: Insecta
- Order: Lepidoptera
- Family: Tortricidae
- Genus: Argyrotaenia
- Species: A. rufescens

Binomial name
- Argyrotaenia rufescens Razowski & Wojtusiak, 2009

Species of moth

Argyrotaenia rufescens is a species of moth of the family Tortricidae. It is found in Morona-Santiago Province, Ecuador.

The wingspan is 14–16 mm.
