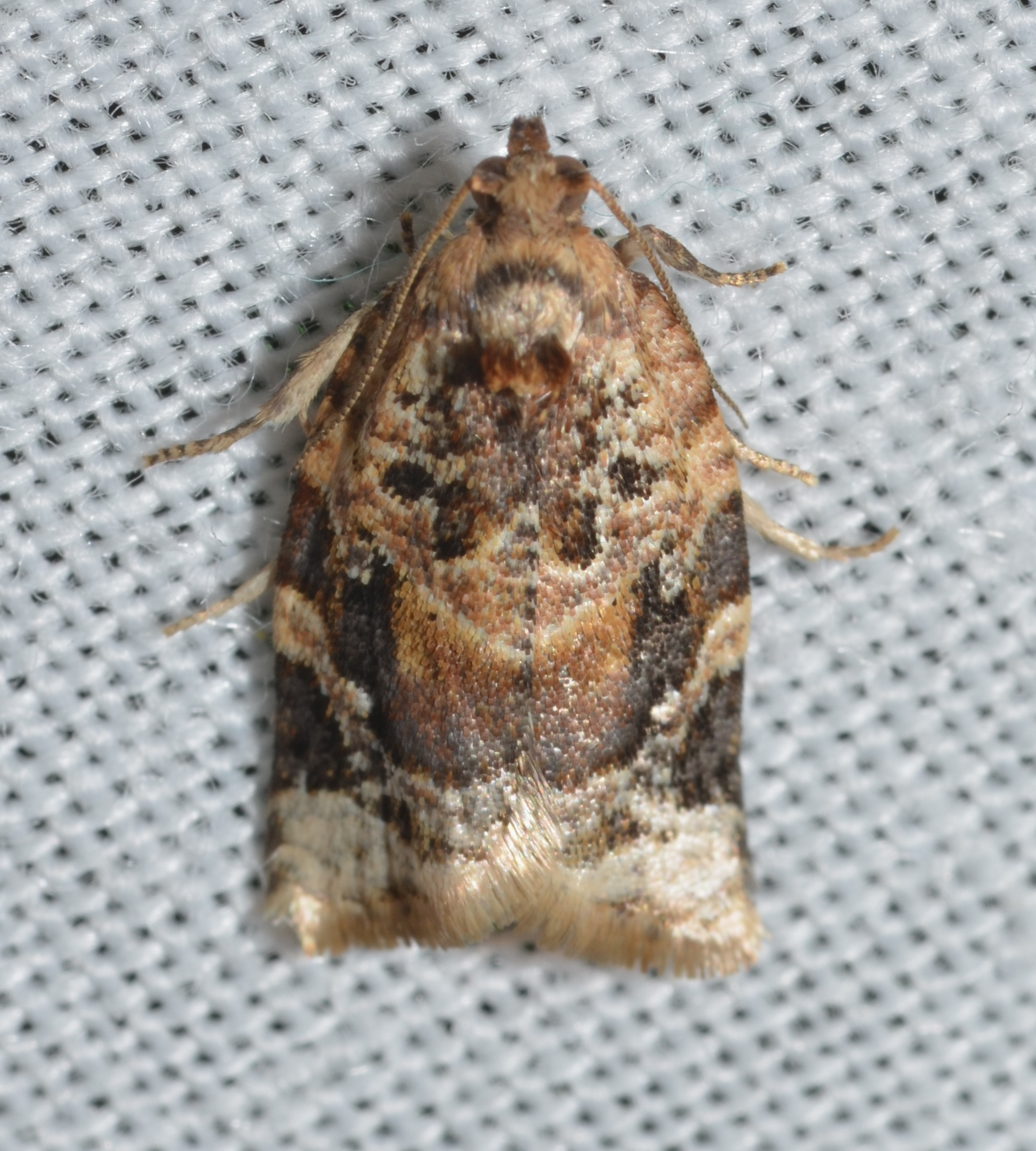

Scientific classification
- Kingdom: Animalia
- Phylum: Arthropoda
- Class: Insecta
- Order: Lepidoptera
- Family: Tortricidae
- Genus: Argyrotaenia
- Species: A. velutinana

Binomial name
- Argyrotaenia velutinana (Walker, 1863)

Synonyms
- Cacoecia velutinana Walker, 1863; Tortrix incertana Clemens, 1865; Tortrix lutosana Clemens, 1865; Cacoecia triferana Walker, 1863

= Argyrotaenia velutinana =

Species of moth

Argyrotaenia velutinana, the red-banded leafroller moth, is a species of moth of the family Tortricidae. It is found in the eastern United States and south-eastern Canada, from Quebec and Ontario to Florida, west to Texas and at least Iowa. It has also been reported from British Columbia.

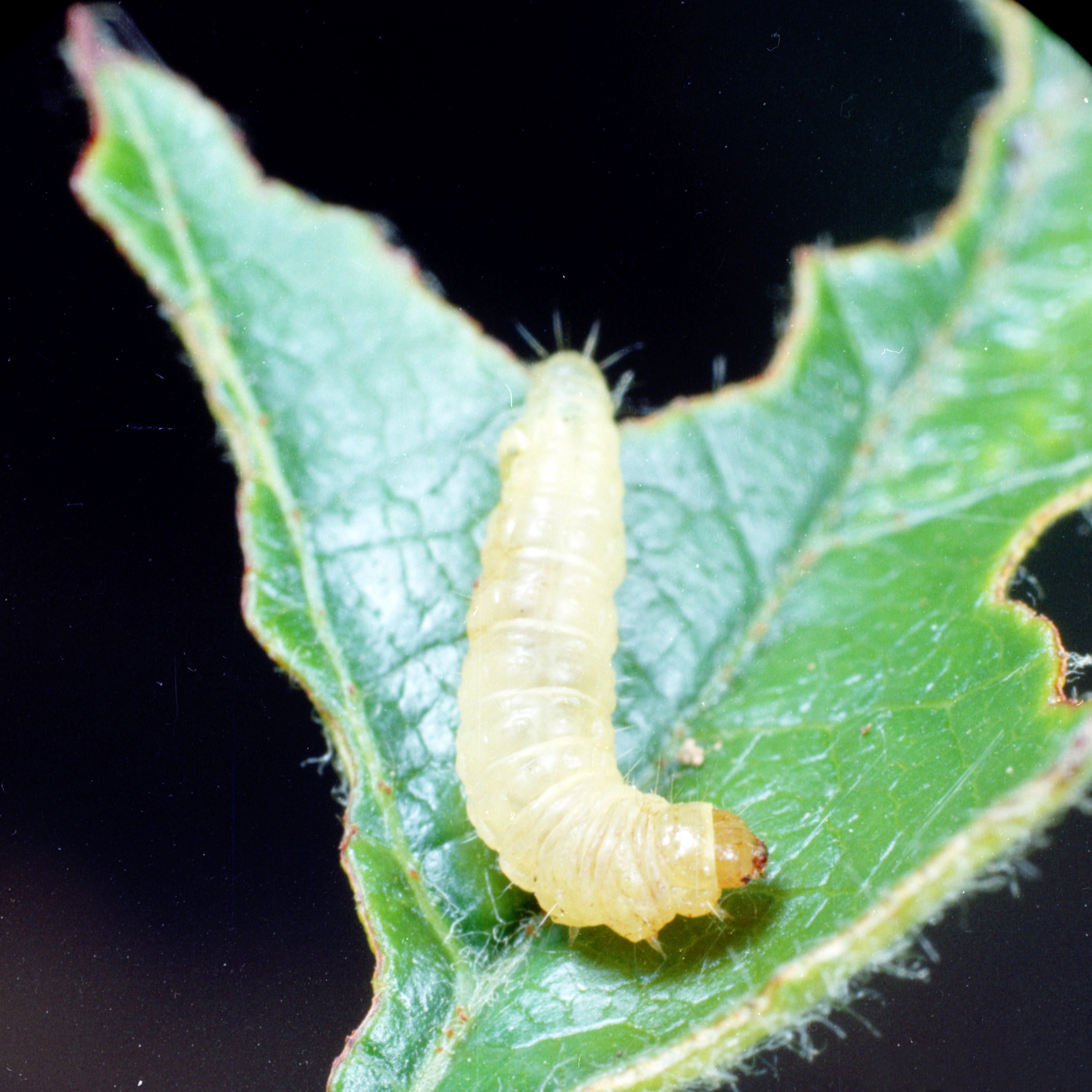
Larva

The wingspan is 13–20 millimetres (1/2–3/4 in).

Neonatal larvae are not thought to naturally commit egg cannibalism. However Rock 1968 was able to induce it in laboratory conditions. They go on to feed on various plants, including the leaves and fruit of apple and other fruit trees, as well as spruce and various vegetables.
