= Argyrotaenia citharexylana =

Scientific classification
- Kingdom: Animalia
- Phylum: Arthropoda
- Clade: Pancrustacea
- Class: Insecta
- Order: Lepidoptera
- Family: Tortricidae
- Genus: Argyrotaenia
- Species: A. citharexylana

Binomial name
- Argyrotaenia citharexylana (Zeller, 1866)

Synonyms
- Teras citharexylana Zeller, 1866; Tortrix citharexylana

Species of moth

Argyrotaenia citharexylana is a species of moth in the family Tortricidae. It is found in Colombia and Costa Rica.
