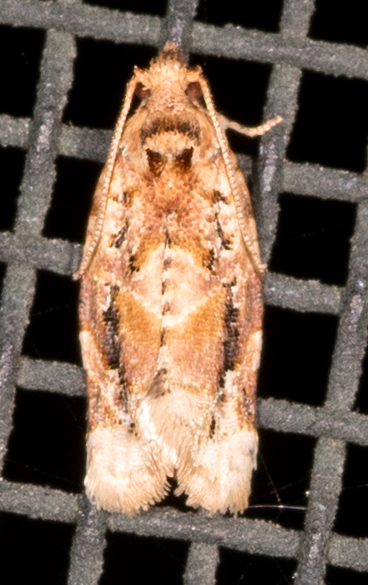

Scientific classification
- Domain: Eukaryota
- Kingdom: Animalia
- Phylum: Arthropoda
- Class: Insecta
- Order: Lepidoptera
- Family: Tortricidae
- Genus: Argyrotaenia
- Species: A. tabulana

Binomial name
- Argyrotaenia tabulana Freeman, 1944

Synonyms
- Argyrotaenia tabluana

= Argyrotaenia tabulana =

Species of moth

Argyrotaenia tabulana, the jack pine tube moth or lodgepole needletier moth, is a species of moth of the family Tortricidae. It is found in North America, where it has been recorded from Alabama, Arkansas, British Columbia, Florida, Georgia, Indiana, Louisiana, Maine, Maryland, Massachusetts, Mississippi, New Jersey, New York, North Carolina, Ohio, Oklahoma, Pennsylvania, South Carolina and West Virginia.

The wingspan is about 14–20 mm. Adults have been recorded on wing from January to October.

The larvae feed on Picea glauca, Picea engelmannii, Pinus species (including Pinus albicaulis, Pinus banksiana, Pinus contorta, Pinus monticola, Pinus ponderosa), Pseudotsuga menziesii and Tsuga heterophylla.
