= Argyrotaenia atima =

Scientific classification
- Kingdom: Animalia
- Phylum: Arthropoda
- Class: Insecta
- Order: Lepidoptera
- Family: Tortricidae
- Genus: Argyrotaenia
- Species: A. atima

Binomial name
- Argyrotaenia atima (Walsingham, 1914)

Synonyms
- Tortrix atima Walsingham, 1914

Species of moth

Argyrotaenia atima is a species of moth of the family Tortricidae. It is found in Panama.

The wingspan is about 15 mm. The forewings are dark reddish fawn, changing to chestnut brown. The hindwings are bright ochreous, tinged with greyish towards the base.
