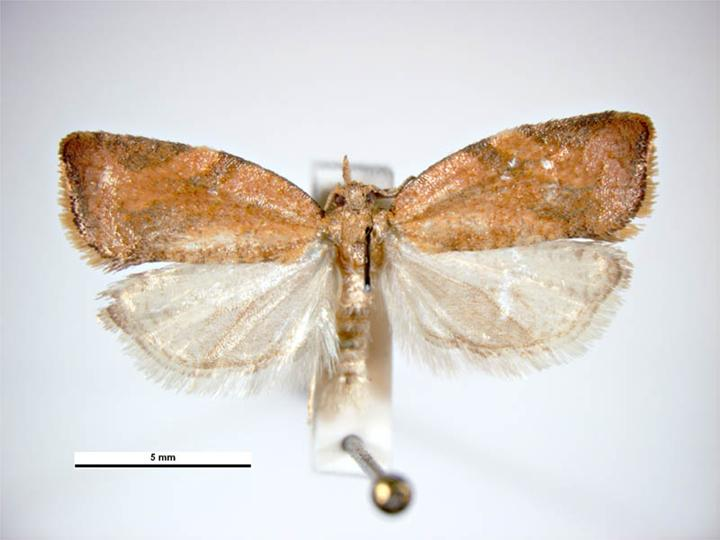
- Female
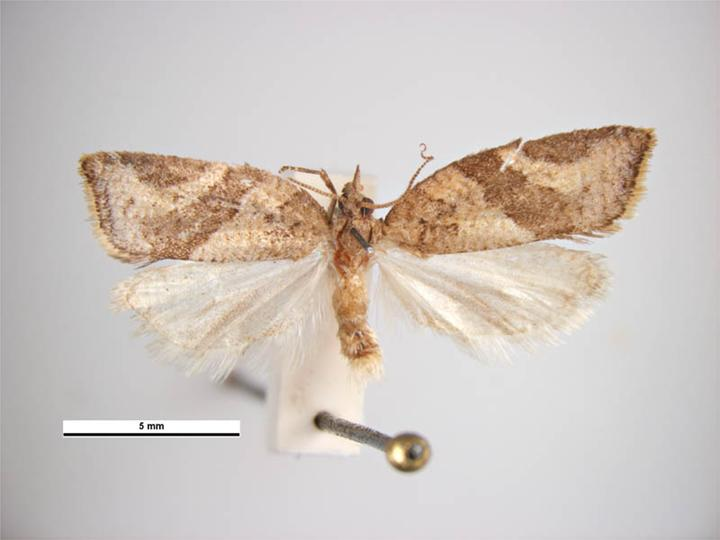
- Male

Scientific classification
- Domain: Eukaryota
- Kingdom: Animalia
- Phylum: Arthropoda
- Class: Insecta
- Order: Lepidoptera
- Family: Tortricidae
- Genus: Argyrotaenia
- Species: A. franciscana

Binomial name
- Argyrotaenia franciscana (Walsingham, 1879)

Synonyms
- Tortrix franciscana Walsingham, 1879; Argyrotaenia kearfotti Obraztsov, 1961; Tortrix citrana Fernald, 1889; Argyrotaenia franciscana insulana Powell, 1964

= Argyrotaenia franciscana =

Species of moth

Argyrotaenia franciscana, the orange tortrix or apple skinworm, is a moth of the family Tortricidae. It is found from California north to Oregon and Washington.

The length of the forewings is 5.6-9.9mm. There are at least two, but sometimes more generations per year.
