= Argyrotaenia interfasciae =

Scientific classification
- Kingdom: Animalia
- Phylum: Arthropoda
- Class: Insecta
- Order: Lepidoptera
- Family: Tortricidae
- Genus: Argyrotaenia
- Species: A. interfasciae

Binomial name
- Argyrotaenia interfasciae Razowski & Wojtusiak, 2010

Species of moth

Argyrotaenia interfasciae is a species of moth of the family Tortricidae. It is known from the Yanachaga–Chemillén National Park in the Pasco Region, Peru. The type series was collected at 2,400–2,460 m (7,870–8,070 ft) above sea level.

The wingspan is about 13 mm in males.
