= Argyrotaenia spaldingiana =

Scientific classification
- Domain: Eukaryota
- Kingdom: Animalia
- Phylum: Arthropoda
- Class: Insecta
- Order: Lepidoptera
- Family: Tortricidae
- Genus: Argyrotaenia
- Species: A. spaldingiana

Binomial name
- Argyrotaenia spaldingiana Obraztsov, 1961

Species of moth

Argyrotaenia spaldingiana is a species of moth of the family Tortricidae. It is found in the United States, where it has been recorded from Utah and Nevada.
