= Argyrotaenia venezuelana =

Scientific classification
- Kingdom: Animalia
- Phylum: Arthropoda
- Class: Insecta
- Order: Lepidoptera
- Family: Tortricidae
- Genus: Argyrotaenia
- Species: A. venezuelana

Binomial name
- Argyrotaenia venezuelana (Walker, 1863)

Synonyms
- Dichelia venezuelana Walker, 1863

Species of moth

Argyrotaenia venezuelana is a species of moth of the family Tortricidae. It is found in Venezuela.
