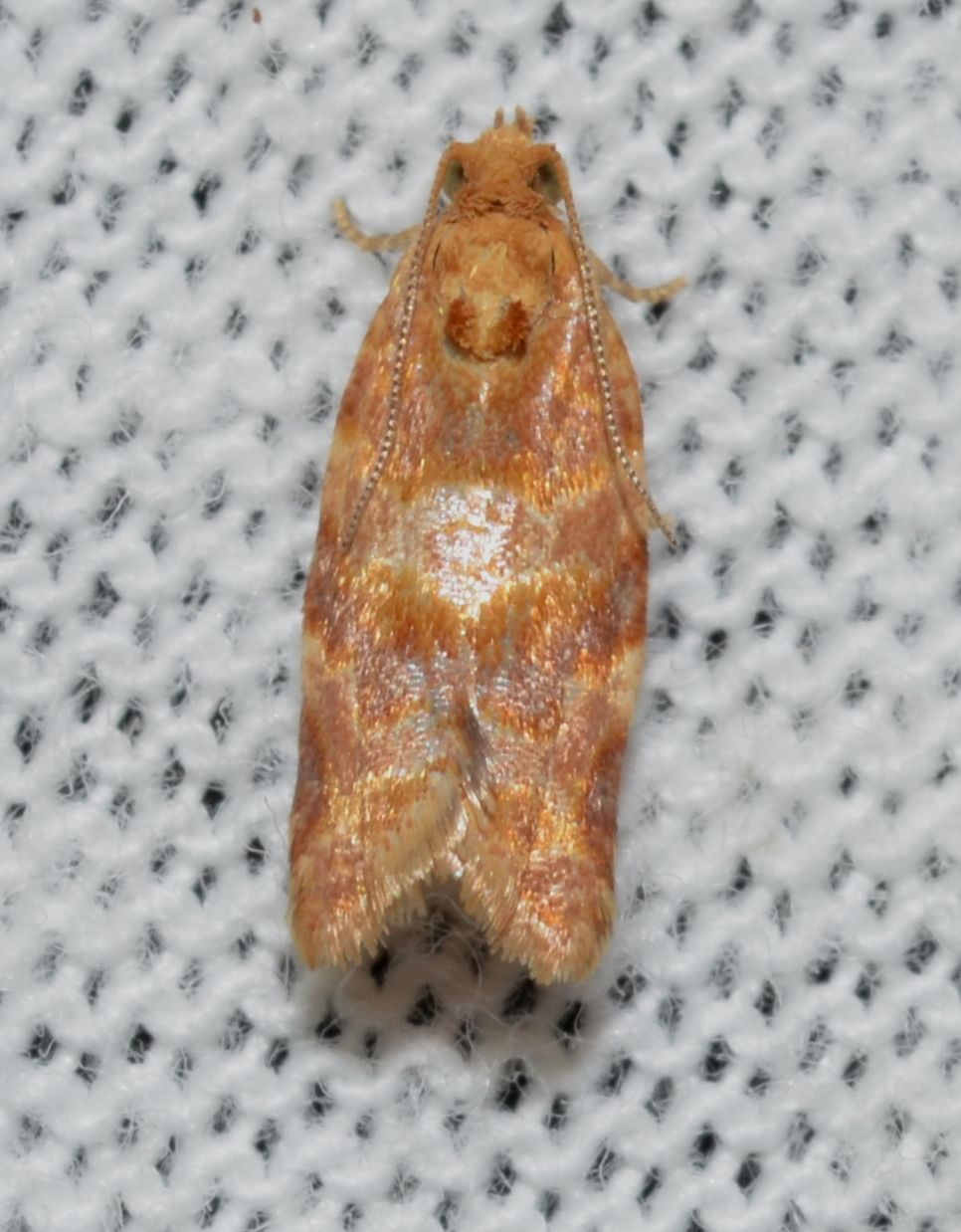

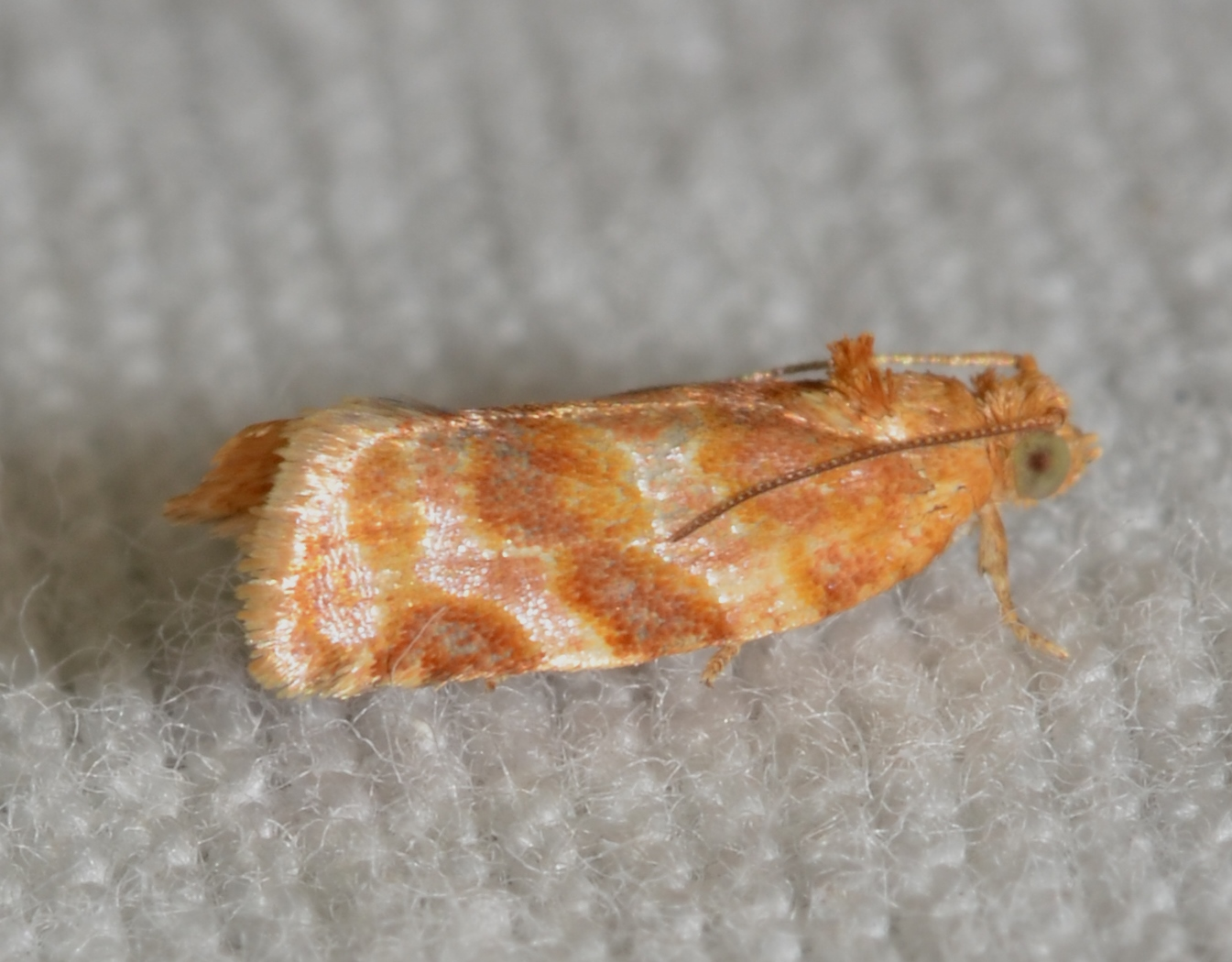

Scientific classification
- Domain: Eukaryota
- Kingdom: Animalia
- Phylum: Arthropoda
- Class: Insecta
- Order: Lepidoptera
- Family: Tortricidae
- Genus: Argyrotaenia
- Species: A. pinatubana

Binomial name
- Argyrotaenia pinatubana (Kearfott, 1905)

Synonyms
- Eulia pinatubana Kearfott, 1905; Eulia pinitubana Meyrick, in Wytsman, 1913

= Argyrotaenia pinatubana =

Species of moth

Argyrotaenia pinatubana, the pine tube moth, is a species of moth of the family Tortricidae. It is found in eastern North America, from Canada south to Florida and west to Wisconsin.

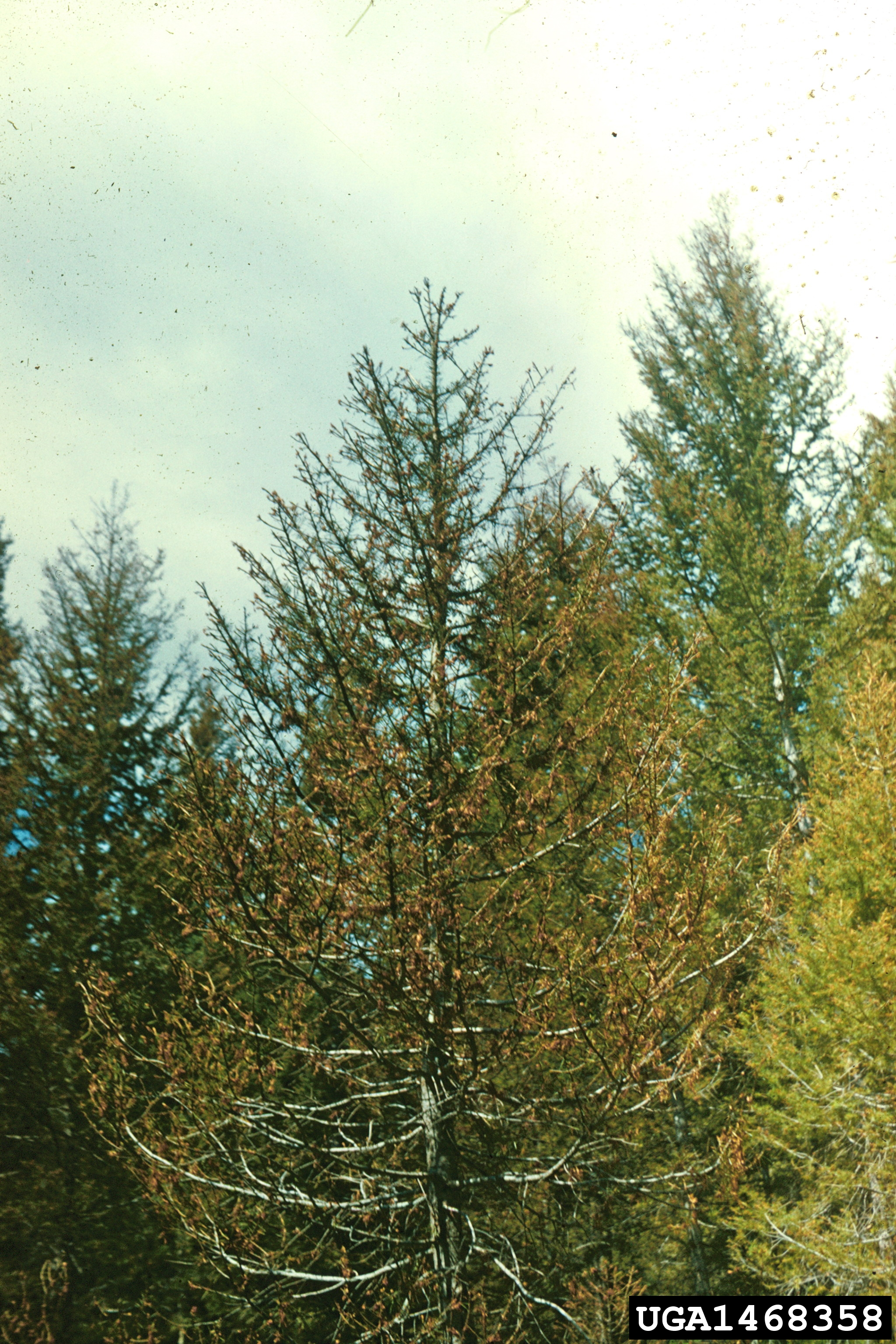
Infestation

The wingspan is 12–17 mm. There are two generations per each year.

The larvae mainly feed on Pinus strobus. They are pale green larvae and can reach a length of about 12 mm.
