= Argyrotaenia dispositana =

Scientific classification
- Kingdom: Animalia
- Phylum: Arthropoda
- Clade: Pancrustacea
- Class: Insecta
- Order: Lepidoptera
- Family: Tortricidae
- Genus: Argyrotaenia
- Species: A. dispositana

Binomial name
- Argyrotaenia dispositana (Zeller, 1877)

Synonyms
- Tortrix dispositana Zeller, 1877; Tortrix spoliana Zeller, 1877

Species of moth

Argyrotaenia dispositana is a species of moth of the family Tortricidae. It is found in Colombia, Ecuador (the provinces of Sucumbíos, Cotopaxi, Bolivar, Pichincha and Carchi) and Peru.
