= Argyrotaenia tristriata =

Scientific classification
- Kingdom: Animalia
- Phylum: Arthropoda
- Class: Insecta
- Order: Lepidoptera
- Family: Tortricidae
- Genus: Argyrotaenia
- Species: A. tristriata

Binomial name
- Argyrotaenia tristriata (Meyrick, 1931)

Synonyms
- Eulia tristriata Meyrick, 1931

Species of moth

Argyrotaenia tristriata is a species of moth of the family Tortricidae. It is found in São Paulo, Brazil.
