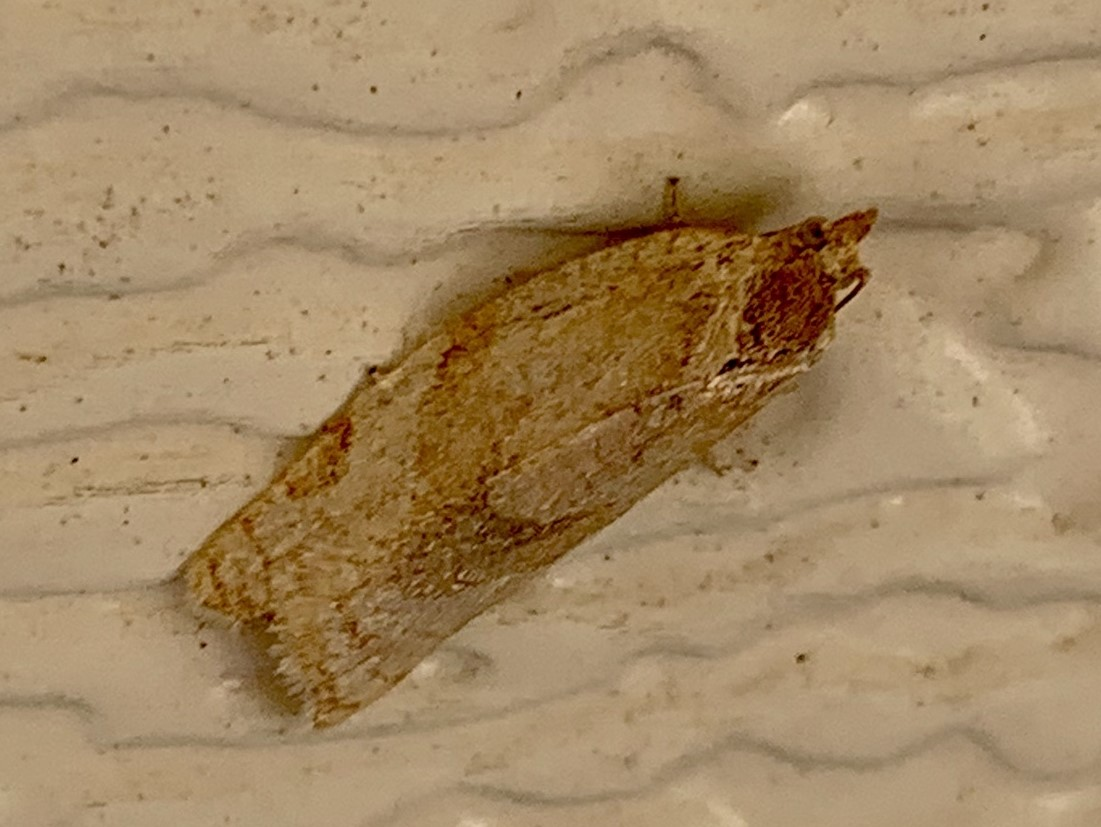

Scientific classification
- Kingdom: Animalia
- Phylum: Arthropoda
- Clade: Pancrustacea
- Class: Insecta
- Order: Lepidoptera
- Family: Tortricidae
- Genus: Argyrotaenia
- Species: A. lautana

Binomial name
- Argyrotaenia lautana Powell, 1960

= Argyrotaenia lautana =

Species of moth

Argyrotaenia lautana is a species of moth of the family Tortricidae. It is found in the United States (Arizona and California) and Mexico (Nuevo León).

Adults have been recorded on wing from June to August.

The larvae feed on Abies concolor and Pseudotsuga macrocarpa.
