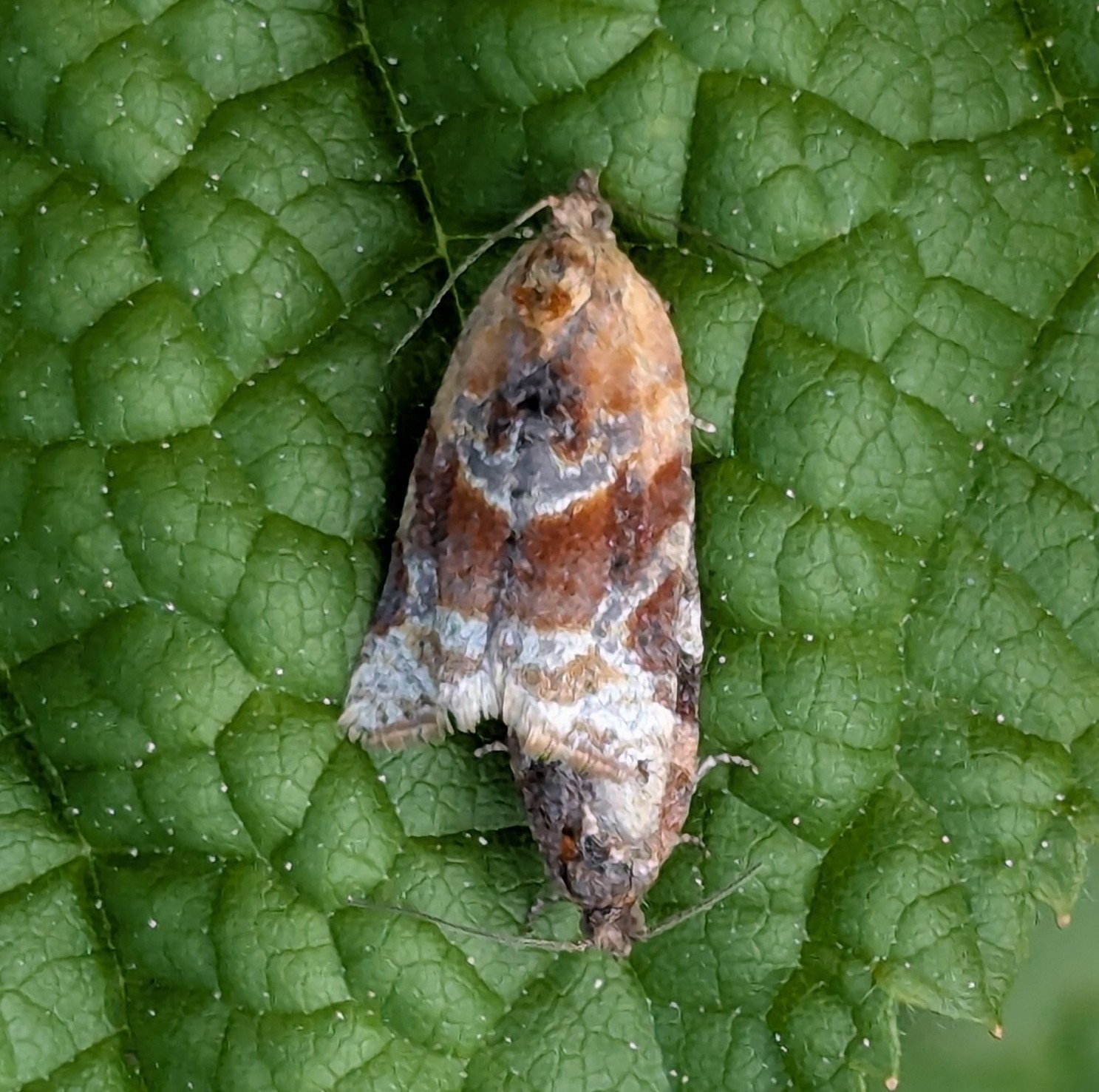
- Mating pair

Scientific classification
- Kingdom: Animalia
- Phylum: Arthropoda
- Clade: Pancrustacea
- Class: Insecta
- Order: Lepidoptera
- Family: Tortricidae
- Genus: Argyrotaenia
- Species: A. repertana

Binomial name
- Argyrotaenia repertana Freeman, 1944

= Argyrotaenia repertana =

Species of moth

Argyrotaenia repertana is a species of moth of the family Tortricidae. It is found in North America, where it has been recorded from Maine, Manitoba, Massachusetts, New Brunswick, Nova Scotia, Quebec, Saskatchewan and Washington.

The wingspan is about 16–17 mm. Adults have been recorded on wing from May to August.

The larvae feed on Aralia species, Rhododendron canadense, Morella caroliniensis, Myrica gale, Aronia melanocarpa, Prunus pensylvanica and Salix species.
