= Argyrotaenia oligachthes =

Scientific classification
- Kingdom: Animalia
- Phylum: Arthropoda
- Class: Insecta
- Order: Lepidoptera
- Family: Tortricidae
- Genus: Argyrotaenia
- Species: A. oligachthes

Binomial name
- Argyrotaenia oligachthes (Meyrick, 1932)

Synonyms
- Eulia oligachthes Meyrick, 1932; Argyrotaenia digachthes Razowski, 1990; Argyrotaenia digahthes Razowski & Becker, 2000; Argyrotaenia oligahthes Razowski, 1964

Species of moth

Argyrotaenia oligachthes is a species of moth of the family Tortricidae. It is found in Costa Rica.
