= Argyrotaenia cacaoticaria =

Scientific classification
- Domain: Eukaryota
- Kingdom: Animalia
- Phylum: Arthropoda
- Class: Insecta
- Order: Lepidoptera
- Family: Tortricidae
- Genus: Argyrotaenia
- Species: A. cacaoticaria

Binomial name
- Argyrotaenia cacaoticaria (Razowski & Wojtusiak, 2006)

Synonyms
- Bonagota cacaoticaria Razowski & Wojtusiak, 2006

Species of moth

Argyrotaenia cacaoticaria is a species of moth of the family Tortricidae. It is found in Morona-Santiago Province of Ecuador and in Peru.
