= Argyrotaenia haemothicta =

Scientific classification
- Kingdom: Animalia
- Phylum: Arthropoda
- Class: Insecta
- Order: Lepidoptera
- Family: Tortricidae
- Genus: Argyrotaenia
- Species: A. haemothicta

Binomial name
- Argyrotaenia haemothicta (Meyrick, 1926)

Synonyms
- Eulia haemothicta Meyrick, 1926

Species of moth

Argyrotaenia haemothicta is a species of moth of the family Tortricidae. It is found in Colombia and Napo Province of Ecuador.

The wingspan is 17.5–24.5 mm (0.69–0.96 in).
