= Argyrotaenia octavana =

Scientific classification
- Domain: Eukaryota
- Kingdom: Animalia
- Phylum: Arthropoda
- Class: Insecta
- Order: Lepidoptera
- Family: Tortricidae
- Genus: Argyrotaenia
- Species: A. octavana

Binomial name
- Argyrotaenia octavana Brown & Cramer, 2000

Species of moth

Argyrotaenia octavana is a species of moth of the family Tortricidae. It is found in Puebla, Mexico.
