= Argyrotaenia cubae =

Scientific classification
- Kingdom: Animalia
- Phylum: Arthropoda
- Clade: Pancrustacea
- Class: Insecta
- Order: Lepidoptera
- Family: Tortricidae
- Genus: Argyrotaenia
- Species: A. cubae

Binomial name
- Argyrotaenia cubae Razowski & Becker, 2010

Species of moth

Argyrotaenia cubae is a species of moth of the family Tortricidae. Females of the species have a forewing length of 8.0–9.0 mm (0.31–0.35 in) and males have a forewing length of 8.5–9.0 mm (0.33–0.35 in). It is known from the Dominican Republic and southern Cuba.

== Taxonomy ==
Argyrotaenia cubae was formally described by the Polish entomologist Józef Razowski and the Brazilian entomologist Vitor Osmar Becker in 2010 based on a male specimen from Independencia Province in the Dominican Republic. The species is named after the country of Cuba.

== Description ==
Females of the species have a forewing length of 8.0–9.0 mm (0.31–0.35 in) and males have a forewing length of 8.5–9.0 mm (0.33–0.35 in). The scales on the vertex, frons, and lateral surface of labial palpus are pale brown to dark chocolate brown. The scales on the medial surface of the labial palpus are pale brown to straw-yellow. The scape is the same color as the vertex. The dorsal surface of the hindwing is light brown. The ventral surfaces of both the forewing and hindwing are pale brown.

Argyrotaenia cubae most closely resembles A. browni in both forewing pattern and genitalia, but can be distinguished by several characters. A. cubae has a more strongly contrasting appearance to the forewing without any hint of red scaling on the interfasciae compared to A. browni. The male genitalia of A. cubae differ from A. browni in possessing more pointed valvae with a significantly wider presaccular gap and a longer, thinner uncus. FThe female genitalia of A. cubae differ from A. browni in possessing a longer, thinner signum with an evenly rounded capitulum and broader papillae anales.

== Distribution and habitat ==
Argyrotaenia cubae is known from the Sierra Maestra range in southern Cuba and from the Cordillera Central and the Monumento Natural Miguel Domingo Fuerte on the eastern edge of the Baoruco Mountain Range, both in the Dominican Republic.
