= Argyrotaenia dichotoma =

Scientific classification
- Domain: Eukaryota
- Kingdom: Animalia
- Phylum: Arthropoda
- Class: Insecta
- Order: Lepidoptera
- Family: Tortricidae
- Genus: Argyrotaenia
- Species: A. dichotoma

Binomial name
- Argyrotaenia dichotoma (Walsingham, 1914)

Synonyms
- Tortrix dichotoma Walsingham, 1914

Species of moth

Argyrotaenia dichotoma is a species of moth of the family Tortricidae. It is found in Mexico in the states of Guerrero and Chiapas and in Guatemala.
