= Argyrotaenia graceana =

Scientific classification
- Kingdom: Animalia
- Phylum: Arthropoda
- Clade: Pancrustacea
- Class: Insecta
- Order: Lepidoptera
- Family: Tortricidae
- Genus: Argyrotaenia
- Species: A. graceana

Binomial name
- Argyrotaenia graceana Powell, 1960

Species of moth

Argyrotaenia graceana is a species of moth of the family Tortricidae. It is found in the United States, where it has been recorded from California, Arizona and New Mexico.

The wingspan is about 20–21 mm. Adults have been recorded on wing from July to August.
