= Argyrotaenia nigrorbis =

Scientific classification
- Kingdom: Animalia
- Phylum: Arthropoda
- Class: Insecta
- Order: Lepidoptera
- Family: Tortricidae
- Genus: Argyrotaenia
- Species: A. nigrorbis

Binomial name
- Argyrotaenia nigrorbis Razowski & Wojtusiak, 2010

Species of moth

Argyrotaenia nigrorbis is a species of moth of the family Tortricidae. It is known from Cordillera de Carpish (Department of Huánuco) and from the Yanachaga–Chemillén National Park (Pasco Region), Peru. The types were collected at 2,420–2,750 m (7,940–9,020 ft) above sea level.

The wingspan is about 23 mm in females.
