= Argyrotaenia spinacallis =

Scientific classification
- Domain: Eukaryota
- Kingdom: Animalia
- Phylum: Arthropoda
- Class: Insecta
- Order: Lepidoptera
- Family: Tortricidae
- Genus: Argyrotaenia
- Species: A. spinacallis

Binomial name
- Argyrotaenia spinacallis Brown & Cramer, 2000

Species of moth

Argyrotaenia spinacallis is a species of moth of the family Tortricidae. It is found in Mexico (Veracruz and the State of Mexico).

The length of the forewings is 9.5–10.5 mm for males and 9.3–9.5 mm for females.

== Etymology ==
The species name refers to the irregular rows of spinelike teeth on the aedeagus.
