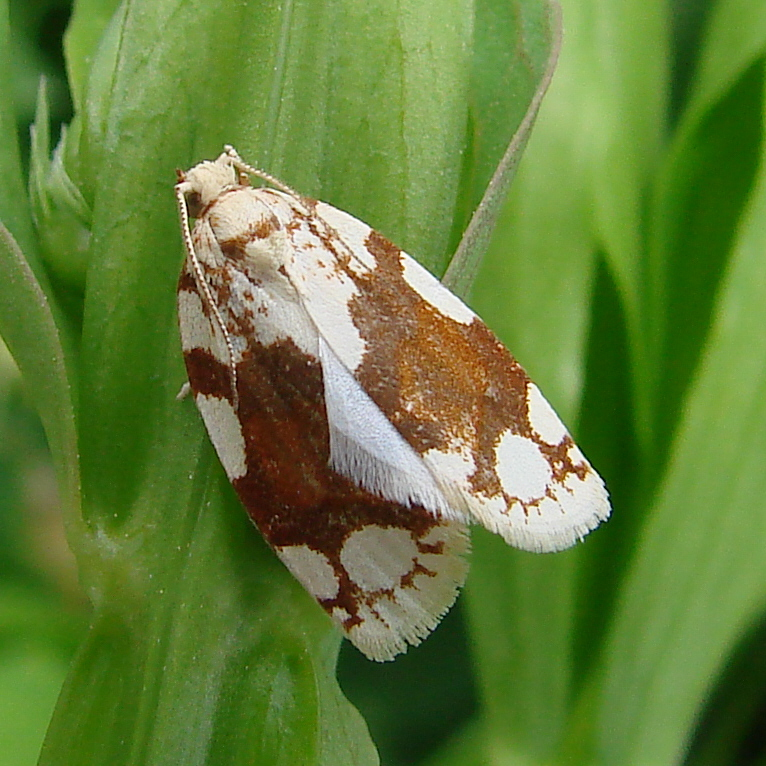

Scientific classification
- Domain: Eukaryota
- Kingdom: Animalia
- Phylum: Arthropoda
- Class: Insecta
- Order: Lepidoptera
- Family: Tortricidae
- Genus: Argyrotaenia
- Species: A. alisellana

Binomial name
- Argyrotaenia alisellana (Robinson, 1869)

Synonyms
- Tortrix alisellana Robinson, 1869

= Argyrotaenia alisellana =

Species of moth

Argyrotaenia alisellana, the white-spotted leafroller, is a moth of the family Tortricidae. It is found from Quebec and Maine to Florida, west to Arkansas, north to North Dakota.

The wingspan is 18–25 mm. Adults are on wing from May to September.

The larvae feed on the leaves of Quercus species.
