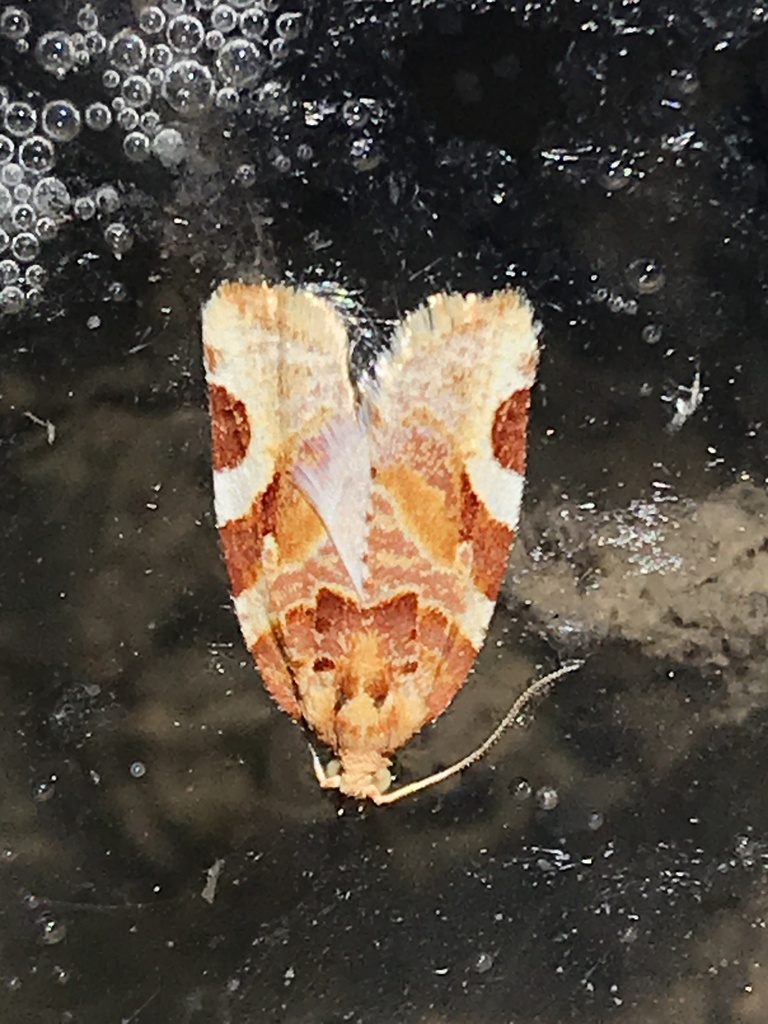

Scientific classification
- Domain: Eukaryota
- Kingdom: Animalia
- Phylum: Arthropoda
- Class: Insecta
- Order: Lepidoptera
- Family: Tortricidae
- Genus: Argyrotaenia
- Species: A. coloradanus

Binomial name
- Argyrotaenia coloradanus (Fernald, 1882)

Synonyms
- Lophoderus coloradanus Fernald, 1882

= Argyrotaenia coloradanus =

Species of moth

Argyrotaenia coloradanus is a species of moth of the family Tortricidae. It is found in the United States, where it has been recorded from Arizona, Colorado, Nevada, New Mexico, Utah and Wyoming.

The wingspan is about 17–23 mm. Adults have been recorded on wing from July to September.

The larvae feed on Anemone species, including Anemone patens and Anemone sylvestris.
