= Argyrotaenia occultana =

Scientific classification
- Domain: Eukaryota
- Kingdom: Animalia
- Phylum: Arthropoda
- Class: Insecta
- Order: Lepidoptera
- Family: Tortricidae
- Genus: Argyrotaenia
- Species: A. occultana

Binomial name
- Argyrotaenia occultana Freeman, 1942

Species of moth

Argyrotaenia occultana, the fall spruce needle moth, is a moth of the family Tortricidae. The species was first described by Thomas Nesbitt Freeman in 1942. It is found in North America, where it has been recorded from British Columbia north to Yukon and Northwest Territories, east to Newfoundland and south to Kentucky and Oregon. The habitat consists of spruce forests.

The wingspan is about 16 mm. Adults have been recorded on wing from the end of April to late June.

The larvae feed on Betula species, Abies species (including Abies balsamea), Larix species, Picea species (including Picea engelmanni, Picea glauca, Picea mariana, Picea rubens), Pinus contorta, Pseudotsuga menziesii and Tsuga species.
