= Argyrotaenia polvosana =

Scientific classification
- Domain: Eukaryota
- Kingdom: Animalia
- Phylum: Arthropoda
- Class: Insecta
- Order: Lepidoptera
- Family: Tortricidae
- Genus: Argyrotaenia
- Species: A. polvosana

Binomial name
- Argyrotaenia polvosana Obraztsov, 1961

Species of insect

Argyrotaenia polvosana is a species of moth of the family Tortricidae. It is found in Chihuahua, Mexico.

The length of the forewings is about 8 mm.
