= Argyrotaenia posticirosea =

Scientific classification
- Kingdom: Animalia
- Phylum: Arthropoda
- Class: Insecta
- Order: Lepidoptera
- Family: Tortricidae
- Genus: Argyrotaenia
- Species: A. posticirosea

Binomial name
- Argyrotaenia posticirosea Razowski & Wojtusiak, 2010

Species of moth

Argyrotaenia posticirosea is a species of moth of the family Tortricidae. It is known from the Yanachaga–Chemillén National Park (Pasco Region), Peru. The holotype was collected at 2,460 m (8,070 ft) above sea level.

The wingspan is about 19 mm for the holotype, a female.
