= Argyrotaenia urbana =

Scientific classification
- Domain: Eukaryota
- Kingdom: Animalia
- Phylum: Arthropoda
- Class: Insecta
- Order: Lepidoptera
- Family: Tortricidae
- Genus: Argyrotaenia
- Species: A. urbana

Binomial name
- Argyrotaenia urbana (Busck, 1912)

Synonyms
- Tortrix urbana Busck, 1912

Species of moth

Argyrotaenia urbana is a species of moth of the family Tortricidae. It is found in the Federal District of Mexico.
