= Argyrotaenia lignitaenia =

Scientific classification
- Kingdom: Animalia
- Phylum: Arthropoda
- Clade: Pancrustacea
- Class: Insecta
- Order: Lepidoptera
- Family: Tortricidae
- Genus: Argyrotaenia
- Species: A. lignitaenia

Binomial name
- Argyrotaenia lignitaenia Powell, 1965

Species of moth

Argyrotaenia lignitaenia is a species of moth of the family Tortricidae. It is found in the United States, where it has been recorded from California.

Adults have been recorded on wing in April.
