= Argyrotaenia graviduncus =

Scientific classification
- Kingdom: Animalia
- Phylum: Arthropoda
- Class: Insecta
- Order: Lepidoptera
- Family: Tortricidae
- Genus: Argyrotaenia
- Species: A. graviduncus

Binomial name
- Argyrotaenia graviduncus Razowski & Wojtusiak, 2010

Species of moth

Argyrotaenia graviduncus is a species of moth of the family Tortricidae. It is known from Cordillera Vilcanota in the Department of Cusco, Peru. The holotype was collected at 3,100 m (10,200 ft) above sea level.

The wingspan is about 18 mm for the holotype, a male.
