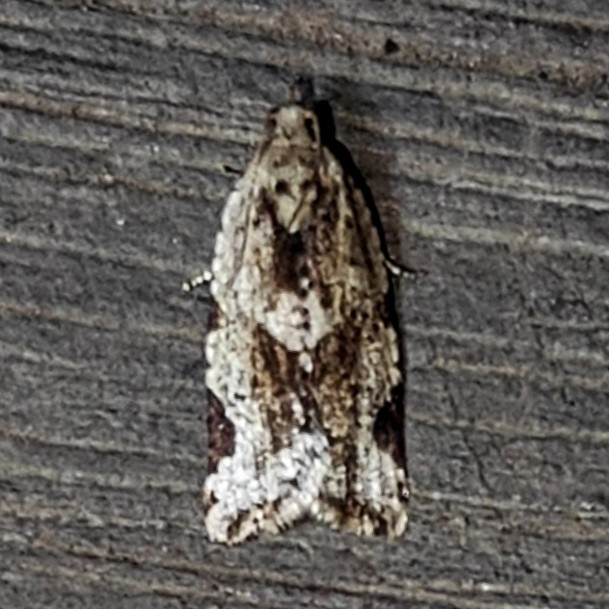

Scientific classification
- Kingdom: Animalia
- Phylum: Arthropoda
- Clade: Pancrustacea
- Class: Insecta
- Order: Lepidoptera
- Family: Tortricidae
- Genus: Argyrotaenia
- Species: A. brimuncus

Binomial name
- Argyrotaenia brimuncus Razowski & Becker, 2000

= Argyrotaenia brimuncus =

Species of moth

Argyrotaenia brimuncus is a species of moth in the family Tortricidae. It is found in Costa Rica.
