= Argyrotaenia tenuis =

Scientific classification
- Kingdom: Animalia
- Phylum: Arthropoda
- Clade: Pancrustacea
- Class: Insecta
- Order: Lepidoptera
- Family: Tortricidae
- Genus: Argyrotaenia
- Species: A. tenuis

Binomial name
- Argyrotaenia tenuis Razowski & Wojtusiak, 2008

Species of moth

Argyrotaenia tenuis is a species of moth of the family Tortricidae. It is found in Ecuador in the provinces of Carchi and Cotopaxi.

The wingspan is 16.5–17.5 mm (0.65–0.69 in).
