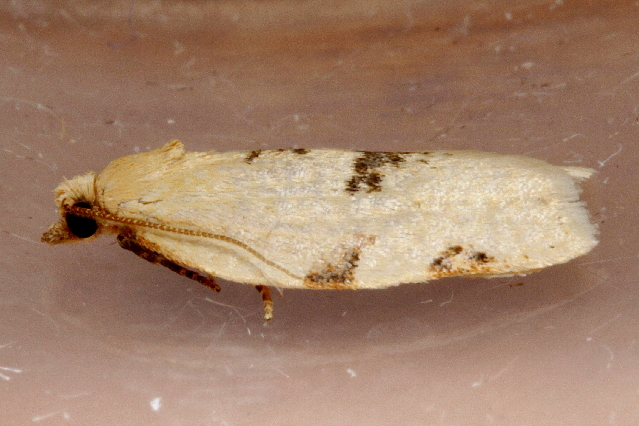

Scientific classification
- Domain: Eukaryota
- Kingdom: Animalia
- Phylum: Arthropoda
- Class: Insecta
- Order: Lepidoptera
- Family: Tortricidae
- Genus: Argyrotaenia
- Species: A. dorsalana

Binomial name
- Argyrotaenia dorsalana (Dyar, 1903)

Synonyms
- Tortrix dorsalana Dyar, 1903; Tortrix dimorphana Barnes & Busck, 1920

= Argyrotaenia dorsalana =

Species of moth

Argyrotaenia dorsalana is a moth of the family Tortricidae. It is found in western North America from southern British Columbia south to California, Arizona, and New Mexico.

The wingspan is 18–24 mm (0.71–0.94 in).

The larvae mainly feed on Douglas-fir, Rocky Mountain Douglas-fir, western hemlock and western larch, but have also been recorded on grand fir, ponderosa pine and spruce. In the Great Basin, the preferred hosts are pinyon pines. It appears to overwinter in the egg stage. Larvae are present from early May to mid-June. Pupation takes place in late June and adults emerge soon after.
