= Argyrotaenia chiapasi =

Scientific classification
- Kingdom: Animalia
- Phylum: Arthropoda
- Clade: Pancrustacea
- Class: Insecta
- Order: Lepidoptera
- Family: Tortricidae
- Genus: Argyrotaenia
- Species: A. chiapasi

Binomial name
- Argyrotaenia chiapasi Razowski & Becker, 2010

Species of moth

Argyrotaenia chiapasi is a species of moth of the family Tortricidae. It is found in Chiapas, Mexico.

The wingspan is 16–20 mm.

== Etymology ==
The species name refers to the state of Chiapas.
