= Argyrotaenia artocopa =

Scientific classification
- Kingdom: Animalia
- Phylum: Arthropoda
- Clade: Pancrustacea
- Class: Insecta
- Order: Lepidoptera
- Family: Tortricidae
- Genus: Argyrotaenia
- Species: A. artocopa

Binomial name
- Argyrotaenia artocopa (Meyrick, 1932)

Synonyms
- Tortrix artocopa Meyrick, 1932

Species of moth

Argyrotaenia artocopa is a species of moth of the family Tortricidae. It is found from Mexico and Costa Rica to Ecuador and Venezuela.
