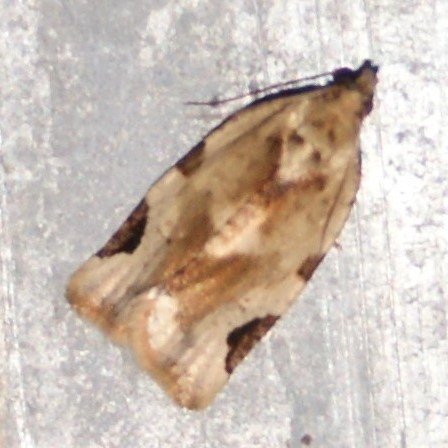

Scientific classification
- Kingdom: Animalia
- Phylum: Arthropoda
- Clade: Pancrustacea
- Class: Insecta
- Order: Lepidoptera
- Family: Tortricidae
- Genus: Argyrotaenia
- Species: A. guatemalica

Binomial name
- Argyrotaenia guatemalica (Walsingham, 1914)

Synonyms
- Tortrix guatemalica Walsingham, 1914

= Argyrotaenia guatemalica =

Species of moth

Argyrotaenia guatemalica is a species of moth in the family Tortricidae. It is found in Guatemala.
