= Argyrotaenia ferruginea =

Scientific classification
- Kingdom: Animalia
- Phylum: Arthropoda
- Clade: Pancrustacea
- Class: Insecta
- Order: Lepidoptera
- Family: Tortricidae
- Genus: Argyrotaenia
- Species: A. ferruginea

Binomial name
- Argyrotaenia ferruginea Razowski & Wojtusiak, 2006

Species of moth

Argyrotaenia ferruginea is a species of moth of the family Tortricidae. It is found in Venezuela and Colombia.

The wingspan is about 17 mm.
