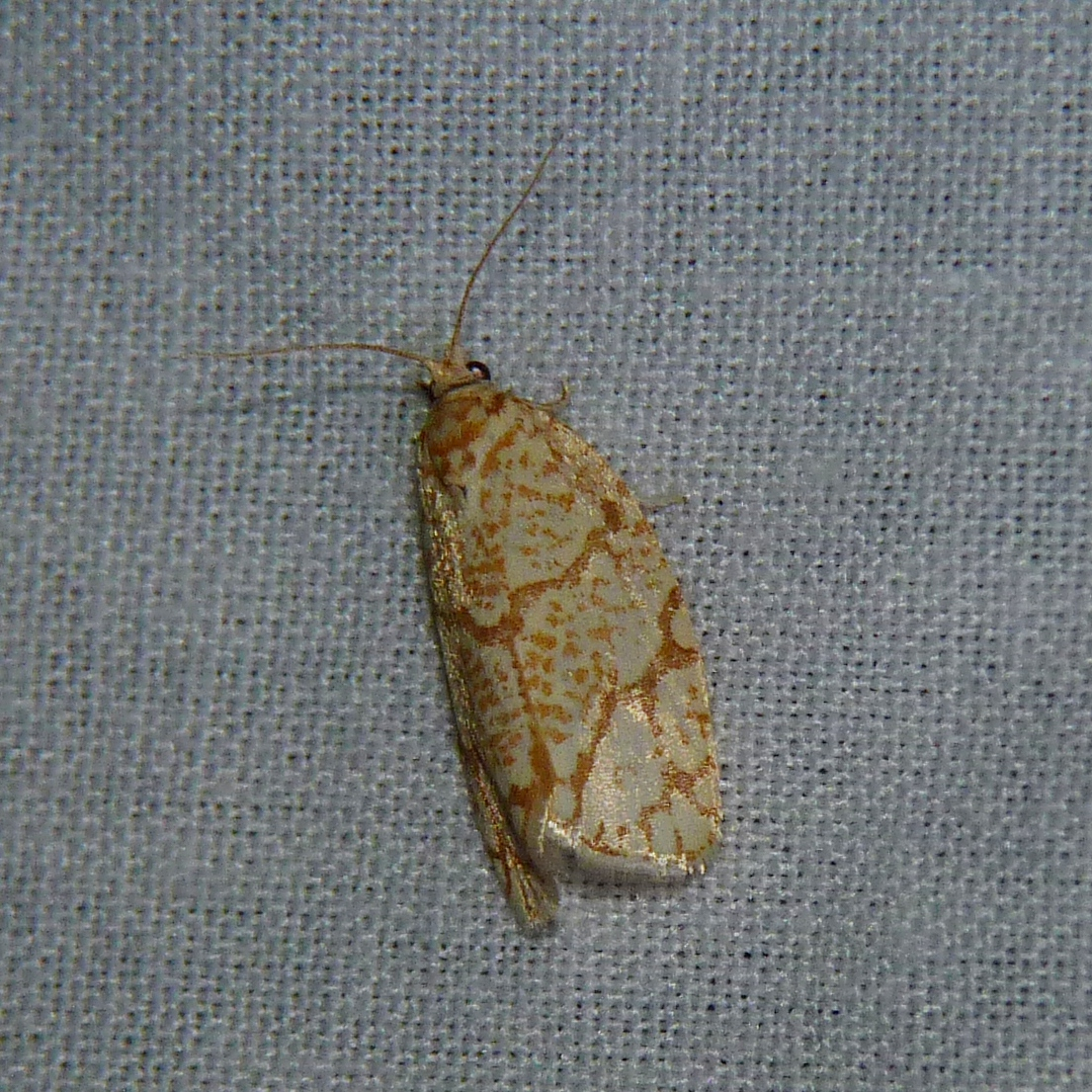

Scientific classification
- Domain: Eukaryota
- Kingdom: Animalia
- Phylum: Arthropoda
- Class: Insecta
- Order: Lepidoptera
- Family: Tortricidae
- Genus: Argyrotaenia
- Species: A. quercifoliana

Binomial name
- Argyrotaenia quercifoliana Fitch, 1858

Synonyms
- Tortrix trifurculana Zeller, 1875

= Argyrotaenia quercifoliana =

Species of moth

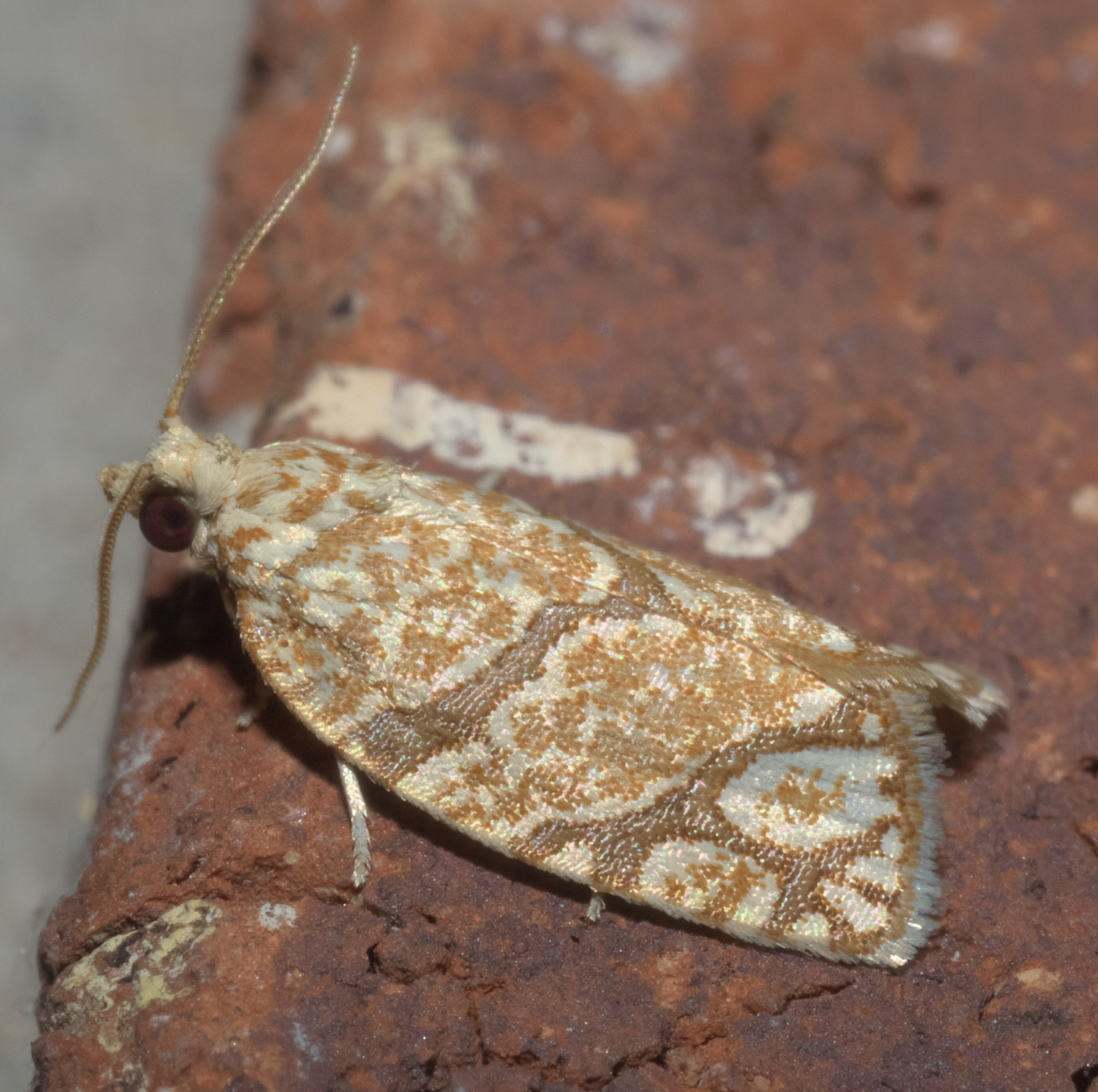
Argyrotaenia quercifoliana, oak leafroller, size: 8.8 mm

Argyrotaenia quercifoliana, the yellow-winged oak leafroller moth, is a species of moth of the family Tortricidae. It is found in eastern North America.

The wingspan is 16–24 mm. Adults are on wing from May to July.

The larvae feed on Hamamelis, Quercus (oak), and possibly Rhamnus (buckthorn) species.
