= Argyrotaenia obvoluta =

Scientific classification
- Kingdom: Animalia
- Phylum: Arthropoda
- Clade: Pancrustacea
- Class: Insecta
- Order: Lepidoptera
- Family: Tortricidae
- Genus: Argyrotaenia
- Species: A. obvoluta

Binomial name
- Argyrotaenia obvoluta Razowski & Becker, 2000

Species of moth

Argyrotaenia obvoluta is a species of moth of the family Tortricidae. It is found in Paraná, Brazil.
