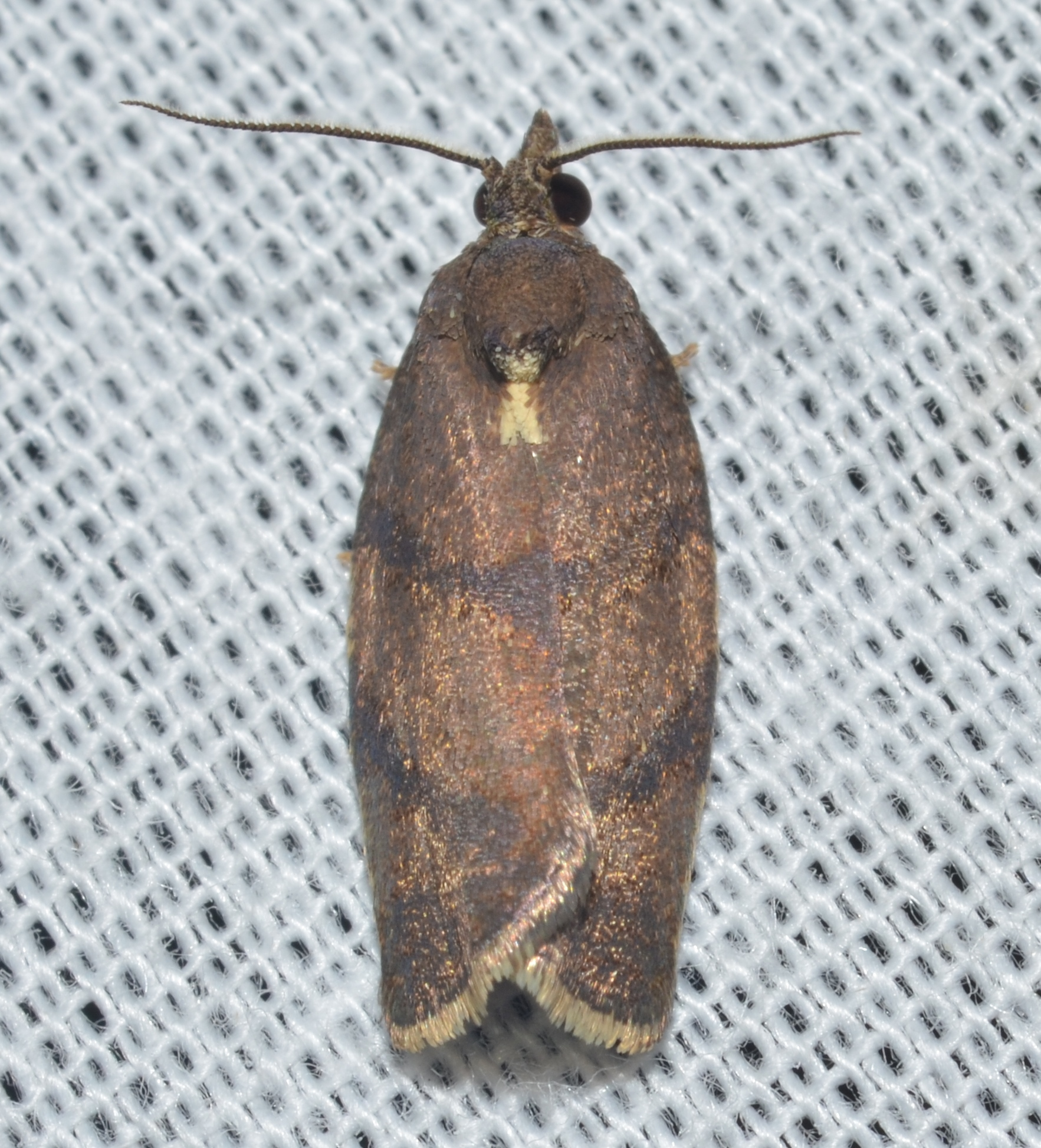

Scientific classification
- Domain: Eukaryota
- Kingdom: Animalia
- Phylum: Arthropoda
- Class: Insecta
- Order: Lepidoptera
- Family: Tortricidae
- Genus: Argyrotaenia
- Species: A. juglandana

Binomial name
- Argyrotaenia juglandana (Fernald, 1879)

Synonyms
- Tortrix juglandana Fernald, 1879

= Argyrotaenia juglandana =

Species of moth

Argyrotaenia juglandana, the hickory leafroller moth, is a species of moth of the family Tortricidae. It is found in North America, where it has been recorded from Alabama, Arkansas, Florida, Illinois, Indiana, Kentucky, Louisiana, Maryland, Mississippi, Missouri, New Hampshire, New York, North Carolina, Ohio, Ontario, Pennsylvania, Quebec, Tennessee, Texas, West Virginia and Wisconsin. The habitat consists of deciduous woodlands and parks where hickory grows.

The wingspan is about 18–20 mm. Adults have been recorded on wing from April to August.

The larvae feed on the leaves of Corylus species, Viburnum species (including Viburnum acerifolium), Carya species (including Carya cordiformis, Carya ovata), Juglans species (including Juglans nigra) and Prunus species.
