= Argyrotaenia cordillerae =

Scientific classification
- Kingdom: Animalia
- Phylum: Arthropoda
- Clade: Pancrustacea
- Class: Insecta
- Order: Lepidoptera
- Family: Tortricidae
- Genus: Argyrotaenia
- Species: A. cordillerae

Binomial name
- Argyrotaenia cordillerae Razowski & Wojtusiak, 2006

Species of moth

Argyrotaenia cordillerae is a species of moth of the family Tortricidae. It is found in Venezuela.

The wingspan is 20-23.5 mm.
