= Claduncaria mesosignaria =

Scientific classification
- Kingdom: Animalia
- Phylum: Arthropoda
- Clade: Pancrustacea
- Class: Insecta
- Order: Lepidoptera
- Family: Tortricidae
- Genus: Claduncaria
- Species: C. mesosignaria

Binomial name
- Claduncaria mesosignaria Razowski, 1999

Synonyms
- Argyrotaenia mesosignaria Razowski, 1999; Argyrotaenia thalamuncus Razowski, 1999

Species of moth

Claduncaria mesosignaria is a species of moth of the family Tortricidae. Adults of the species have a forewing length of 8.5–10.5 mm (0.33–0.41 in) and a wingspan of 18–19.5 mm (0.71–0.77 in). It is endemic to the Dominican Republic; it has a distribution centered around the Cordillera Central mountain range in the La Vega and San José de Ocoa provinces. The moth inhabits pine forests, grasslands, and cloud forests at elevations of 1,850–2,288 m (6,000–8,000 ft).

== Taxonomy ==
Claduncaria mesosignaria was formally described as Argyrotaenia mesosignaria by the Polish entomologist Józef Razowski in 1999 based on a female collected from the La Vega Province in the Dominican Republic. In the same paper, Razowski also described A. thamaluncus based on a male collected from the San José de Ocoa Province. A 2020 review of the taxonomy of the Caribbean Archipini found that these two specimens likely represented two sexes of the same species. As neither species name in this case had taxonomic priority, they synonymized the two and chose to preserve the name A. mesosignaria. They also moved A. mesosignaria to the genus Claduncaria based on the morphology of its male genitalia. C. mesosignaria is most closely related to C. minisignaria.

== Description ==
Claduncaria mesosignaria has an appearance that is fairly typical for members of its genus. Adults of the species have a forewing length of 8.5–10.5 mm (0.33–0.41 in) and a wingspan of 18–19.5 mm (0.71–0.77 in).

== Distribution and habitat ==
Claduncaria mesosignaria has to-date only been recorded from the Dominican Republic, where it has a distribution centered around the Cordillera Central mountain range in the La Vega and San José de Ocoa provinces. It is thought to have a distribution limited to this region. The moth inhabits pine forests, grasslands, and cloud forests at elevations of 1,850–2,288 m (6,000–8,000 ft).
