= Hurricanes in Hispaniola =

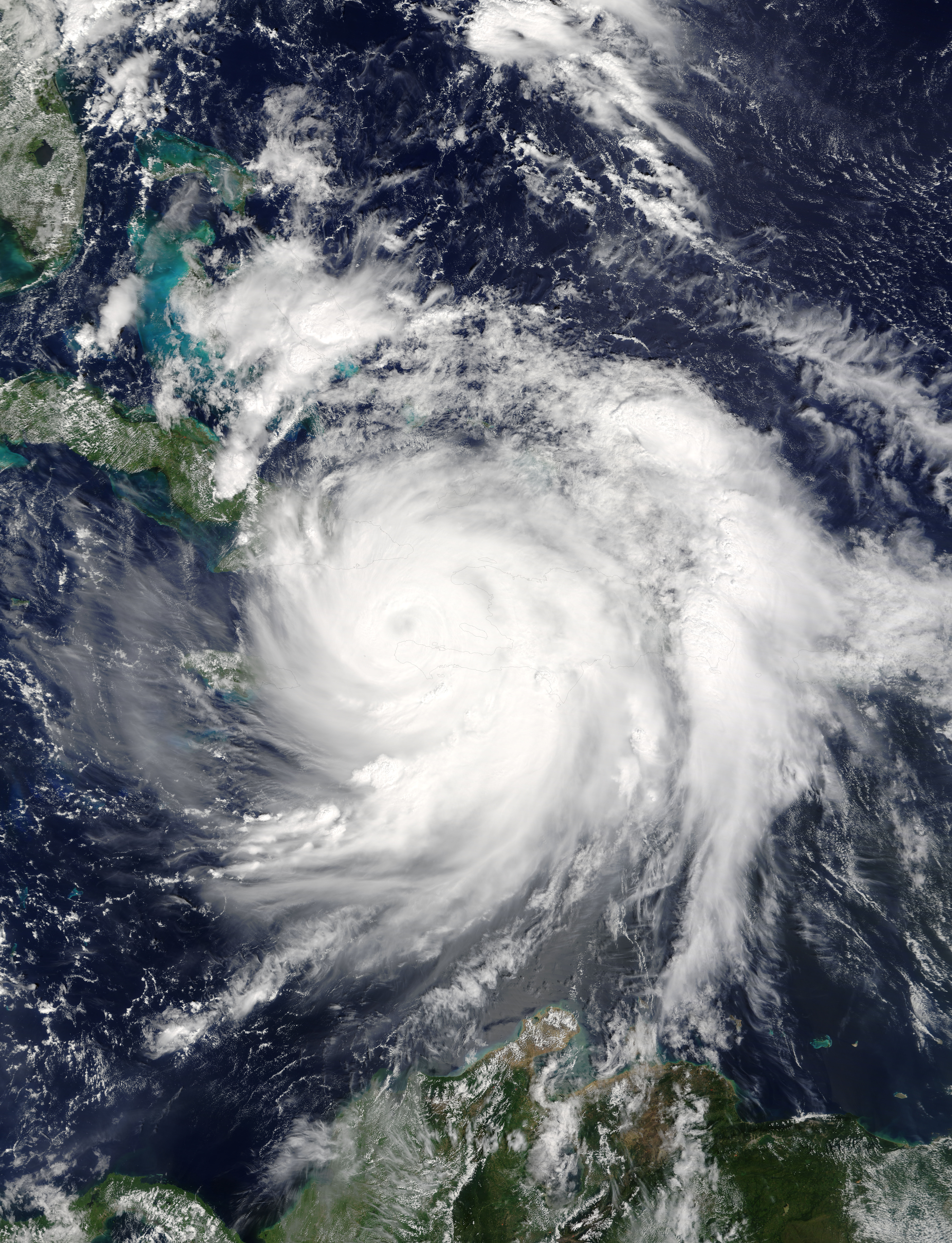
Hurricane Matthew just north of the Tiburon Peninsula of Haiti on October 4, 2016.

Hispaniola is an island in the Caribbean, with the second largest size throughout all of the Caribbean. Throughout the centuries, since reliable records began, hundreds of hurricanes and tropical cyclones have affected Haiti and the Dominican Republic, the two countries that share the island. The most recent tropical cyclone to affect Hispaniola was Hurricane Melissa in October 2025.

== Pre-1900s ==
=== 1800s ===
- August 18, 1816 - A hurricane hits Haiti near Port-au-Prince.
- September 21, 1894 - Hurricane Four passes over the Dominican Republic and Haiti. 500 homes and two churches were damaged; many other buildings had been damaged, with most of them losing their roofs.
- August 9, 1899 – The 1899 San Ciriaco hurricane brushes the north Dominican Republic coast with 120 mile per hour winds. Along the Ozama River, heavy rainfall washed away an iron bridge. A rush of water was also reported along the Haina River in the province of San Cristóbal, washing away many houses.

== 1900s ==
- July 5, 1901 - Tropical Storm Two passes to the southwest of the Tiburon Peninsula. In the Dominican Republic, in the region between Cotuí and Vega Real, flooding occurred after rivers overflowed their banks, and high winds knocked out communications in the Dominican Republic. In Haiti, there were reports of strong winds and "severe rain", and several ships were destroyed along the coast of Haiti. 14 deaths were reported, with five in Jacmel and nine in Les Cayes.
- November 12, 1909 - The 1909 Greater Antilles hurricane makes landfall around Nord-Ouest with winds of 85 miles per hour (137 km/h), causing rainfall to accumulate up to 24 inches (610 millimeters), and resulting in flash floods and large mud slides. Gonaïves was completely flooded, with residents finding safety in the upper levels and roofs of homes. 16 people were killed in Gonaïves after a bridge collapsed due to a swollen river. The Tonazeau River near Port-au-Prince also rose, flooding nearby lands. A large lake 30 miles (48 kilometers) long and up to 80 feet (24 meters) deep formed along the Yaqui River due to unprecedented flooding. Estimates of deaths were in the hundreds, and many villages were destroyed. The only damage estimate for Haiti is $3 million (1909 USD). Overall, damage was $3 million, and 166 fatalities were reported.

=== 1910s ===
- August 13, 1915 - A hurricane passes in between Haiti and Jamaica as a major hurricane, causing damage. Communications between Port-au-Prince and America were cut off, and crops were damaged.

=== 1920s ===
- August 9, 1928 - The 1928 Haiti hurricane makes landfall on the Tiburon Peninsula of Haiti as a Category 1 with 90 mile per hour winds, bringing torrential rainfall for more than 20 hours. Saint-Louis-du-Sud was almost completely decimated, with only two buildings keeping their roofs, and both Grand-Boucan and Petit-Trou-de-Nippes had been completely flattened. A majority of villages impacted by the storm were flooded with eight to twenty feet (2.4 to 6.1 meters) of water, and more than 10,000 people were left homeless. More than 200 bodies were recovered, which included 12 from Miragoâne, and another 24 from a dwelling in Belle-Riviere. Many of the roads that were unpaved and not used very much by vehicles had been torn apart and destroyed. Overall, 200 people were killed and there was more than $1 million in damage.

=== 1930s ===
- September 3, 1930 - The 1930 Dominican Republic hurricane makes landfall in the Dominican Republic as a Category 4 hurricane with 155 miles per hour (249 km/h) winds, making it estimated among some of the strongest hurricanes in the country, causing in between $15 million and $50 million in damage (1930 USD, $235 million and $780 million in damage 2020 USD), and killing in between 2,000 and 8,000 people. Wind gusts in Santo Domingo were estimated at 150 to 200 miles per hour, with one building recording sustained winds of 100 miles per hour before the roof sustained damage by the storm and a Pan American anemometer reporting a gust of 180 miles per hour before the anemometer was blown away and destroyed. Three districts of Santo Domingo had been completely destroyed with an Associated Press report saying that "there was [barely] a wreck of wall left". Even though this storm was very powerful and destructive, due to its small size, villages 75 miles away from the center of the hurricane didn't even know that it existed. The Ozama River flowed at 15 miles per hour due to heavy rainfall, stopping people from riding the river. Overall, the storm causing in between $15 million and $50 million, and killing between 2,000 and 8,000 people being killed, with the Red Cross reporting 2,000 deaths and 8,000 injuries, though the real death total is still unknown.
- September 11, 1931 - Hurricane Seven makes landfall in the Dominican Republic as a minimal hurricane. Pan-American Airlines reported that the Santo Domingo power plant had been disabled.
- September 28, 1932 - The 1932 San Ciprián hurricane makes landfall near the border of the Dominican Republic and Haiti as a Category 2 hurricane with 105 miles per hour (169 km/h) winds, resulting in strong winds and rainfall places devastated by the 1930 Dominican Republic hurricane. Residents closed businesses, with some evacuating and going to churches. 90 miles per hour (140 km/h) winds were reported in San Pedro de Macorís while 50 miles per hour (80 km/h) were reported in Santo Domingo. The agriculture in Santo Domingo had reports that there was "considerable damage".
- October 21, 1935 - The 1935 Jérémie hurricane drops torrential rainfall in the cities of Jérémie and Jacmel, killing 2,000 people. The rainfall isolated the already remote Tiburon Peninsula even more after roads and bridges were destroyed by rising water from rivers and lakes. A hydroelectric power plant had been completely decimated, taking out power and water for much of the Tiburon Peninsula. Flooding in Jérémie was bad enough to sweep away a metal bridge and hundreds of homes were destroyed, leaving the small number of people left, homeless. Many of the deceased had been swept out to sea, and one estimate was that 1,500 people in the Jérémie area alone had been killed by the storm, meaning it would be the worst disaster in the cities history.

=== 1940s ===
- August 4, 1945 - Tropical Storm Three makes landfall west of Santo Domingo, producing scattered thunderstorms and squally weather.
- May 22, 1948 - Tropical Storm One makes landfall in Haiti with 35 miles per hour (56 km/h), dropping heavy precipitation. In Ciudad Trujillo (now Santo Domingo), nine inches (230 millimeters) of rainfall fell in less than one day, causing significant impact from flooding. 20 bridges had been destroyed, secluding the city from the rest of the Dominican Republic. An estimated 80 people were killed, along with seven people who went missing after being swept away by floodwaters.
- September 22, 1949 - Hurricane Ten makes landfall in the Dominican Republic as a tropical storm. 15 people were killed and there was $12,000 in damage.

=== 1950s ===
- October 12, 1954 - Hurricane Hazel makes landfall in Haiti as a Category 3 hurricane in Haiti, killing 469 people and causing $500,000 in damage. The South Peninsula of Haiti took the brunt of the storm, with the largest city at the time, Aux Cayes, reporting 200 deaths while Jérémie, the second largest city at the time, had been flooded by the sea and had reported 200 deaths. More the 40 percent of the coffee crop had been destroyed while 50 percent of the cacao crop had been destroyed, affecting the Haitian economy for several years. Most of the casualties from Hazel were when water would flow down mountains as high as 8,000 feet (2,400 meters) tall, drowning many people. Objects in Haiti, such as bowls and plates, were transported to the Carolinian coast by Hazel. Overall, Hazel killed 469+ people and caused $500,000 in damage.
- October 17, 1955 - Hurricane Katie makes landfall in extreme eastern Sud-Est as a Category 2 hurricane with 110 miles per hour (180 km/h) winds, killing 7 and causing $200,000 in damage. Half the homes in the town of Anse-à-Pitres had been completely demolished by the storm. Meanwhile, over in the Dominican Republic, in the town of Pedernales, 68 homes were damaged. Overall, 7 people were killed and there was $200,000 in damage.
- September 1, 1958 - Hurricane Ella makes landfall on the Tiburon Peninsula of Haiti with 110 miles per hour (180 km/h) winds, causing $100,000 in damage and killing 33 people. In the Dominican Republic, in the city of Santo Domingo, wind gusts reached 37 miles per hour, causing minor property damage. Rainfall from Ella was moderate, peaking at 9.63 inches (245 millimeters) in Polo, Barahona, causing $100,000 in damage in the southwestern Dominican Republic. In Haiti, agriculture damage was heavy, with about one-third of the crop in Haiti being washed out, mostly to sugar cane and banana crop; a lot of cattle was also killed. Flash flooding from heavy rainfall killed 30 people and left another 3 missing near Aux Cayes, and roads were covered with 5–6 feet (1.5–1.8 meters) of water. Overall, Hurricanes Ella caused $100,000 in damage and killed 33 people.

=== 1960s ===
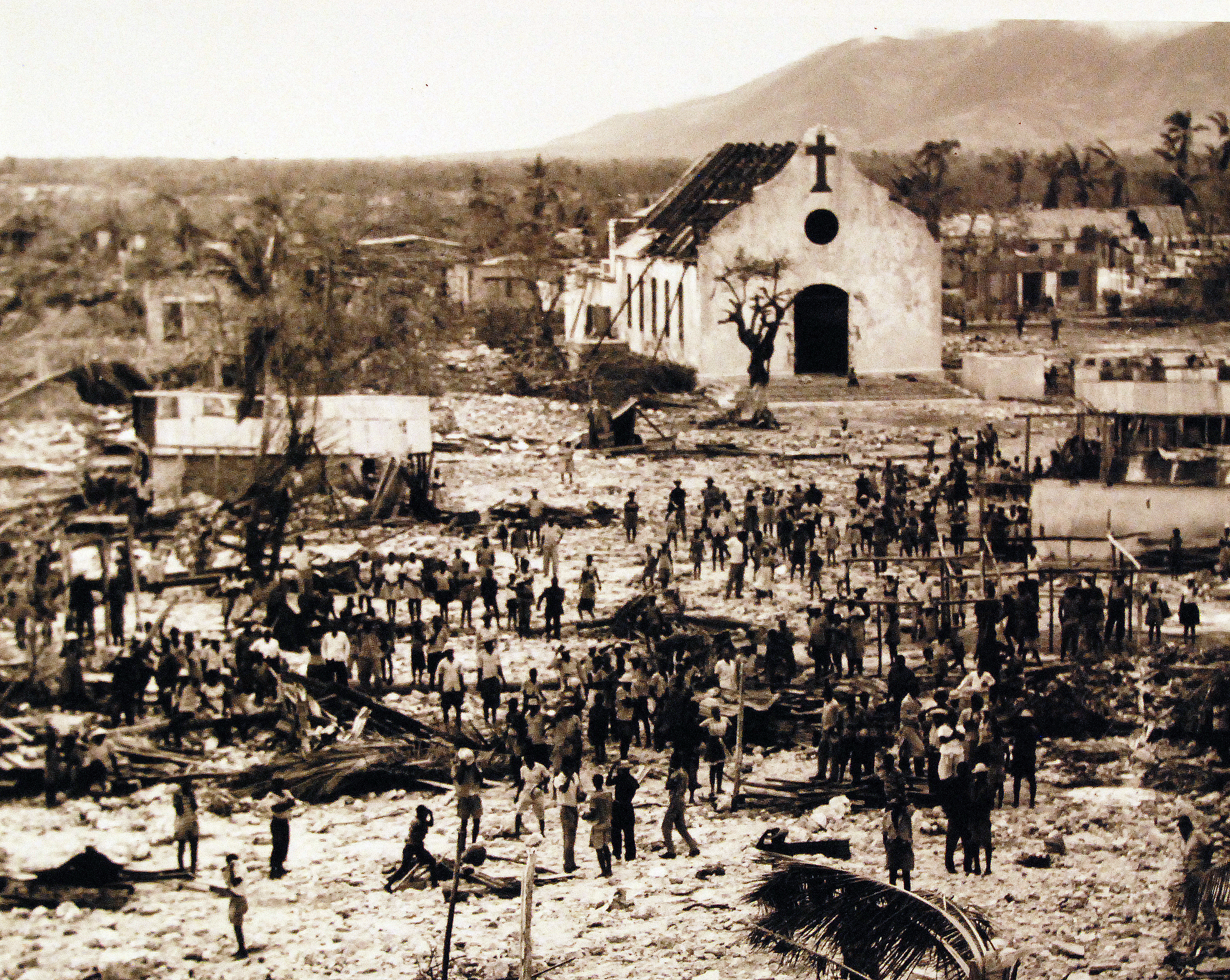
- Damage in Petit-Trou-de-Nippes following Hurricane Flora. Around 85% of Petit-Trou-de-Nippes was destroyed during the hurricane.
  October 3, 1963 – Hurricane Flora makes landfall in Sud as a Category 4 hurricane with 150 mph (240 km/h) winds, dropping torrential rain and bringing strong winds. In the Dominican Republic, they recorded a peak of 39.43 (1,0002 mm) inches of rainfall at Polo Barahona, greatly damaging roads and bridges, mostly from flooding that was considered the most extensive on record. An estimated 3,800 square miles (10,000 kilometers) of the western Dominican Republic was flooded. Meanwhile, in Haiti, strong winds were reported at 120 (195 kilometers per hour) miles per hour near Derez while in Port-au-Prince peak winds were recorded at 65 (102 kilometers per hour) miles per hour. The coffee crop in Haiti was harvested earlier in the season, but hundreds of coffee trees and bushes were damaged or destroyed, with one person estimating it would take three years for the coffee crop to grow back. The strong winds ripped roofs off homes and destroyed buildings, with three entire communities destroyed by the combination of strong winds and rough waves. Intense rain bands dropped torrential rain, with estimates of 75 inches of rain in Miragoâne, though they only recorded a peak of 57.00 inches (1,448 millimeters). Storm surge was unknown on the southern coast, though it was estimated at 12 feet (3.7 meters) high. Flash floods destroyed the plantation crop and washed out large chunks of villages, with mudslides burying entire villages. The Grise River crested at 14 feet (4.3 meters) above normal from heavy rainfall. Overall, damage was in between $185 and $240 million (1963 USD, $1.5 - $2 billion 2020 USD) in damage, and 3,900 - 5,400 deaths.
- August 24, 1964 – Hurricane Cleo makes landfall in the Tiburon Peninsula at peak intensity with 150 mph (240 km/h) winds, dropping heavy rain and bringing strong winds. Cleo led to the highest 24-hour rainfall accumulation with 19.99 (507.8 mm) inches in Haiti. The town of Les Cayes, Haiti was completely leveled after Cleo. The U.S.S Boxer was sent to Hispaniola to help with recovery efforts, such as medical aid and evacuating services. Overall there was $7 million (1964 USD) in damage, and 139 people were killed.
- September 29, 1966 – Hurricane Inez makes landfall in the Barahona Province of the Dominican Republic with winds of 140 (225 km/h) miles per hour before briefly moving off Haiti and the Dominican Republic and then striking Haiti near Jacmel, being considered to be the worst hurricane to strike Haiti since the 1920s. In the Barahona Province of the Dominican Republic 800 homes were destroyed and nationwide around 5,000 people were left homeless. The agriculture in the Dominican Republic was also impacted severely by Hurricane Inez, with the cotton, coffee, sugar cane, and cocoa crop being heavily damaged. Heavy rains flooded the Ozama River in Santo Domingo, forcing thousands to evacuate and flooding hundreds of homes, while rough and high seas destroyed a part of a sea wall. In Haiti, winds cut communications out for much of the country. In a location called "a valley of death", high rainfall led to flash flooding, while the local Weather Bureau remarked that winds could have easily exceeded 160 (260 km/h) miles per hour. The Haitian Government reported there was over one thousand deaths just a couple of weeks after Inez impacted them, while the United States Government reported "no less than 50 people were killed" and "nor was there a real emergency" due to the President of Haiti (1957-1971), François Duvalier, mishandling previous aid the US government gave them. Overall, 1,500+ people were injured, 850+ people were killed, more than 65,000 people were left homeless, and damage was estimated at $32.35 million (1966 USD, $260 million 2020 USD).
- September 11, 1967 – Hurricane Beulah makes landfall in the Barahona Province, impacting places still recovering from Hurricane Inez a year prior with 90 mph (140 km/h) winds. There was an estimated 200,000 evacuees, most likely from fears of another Inez; the system had 130-150 mile per hour winds before rapidly weakening of an eyewall replacement cycle. Due to swift evacuations only two people were killed, but flash flooding affected both southern Haiti and southern Dominican Republic, while an estimated 1,000 people were left homeless after Beulah.

=== 1970s ===
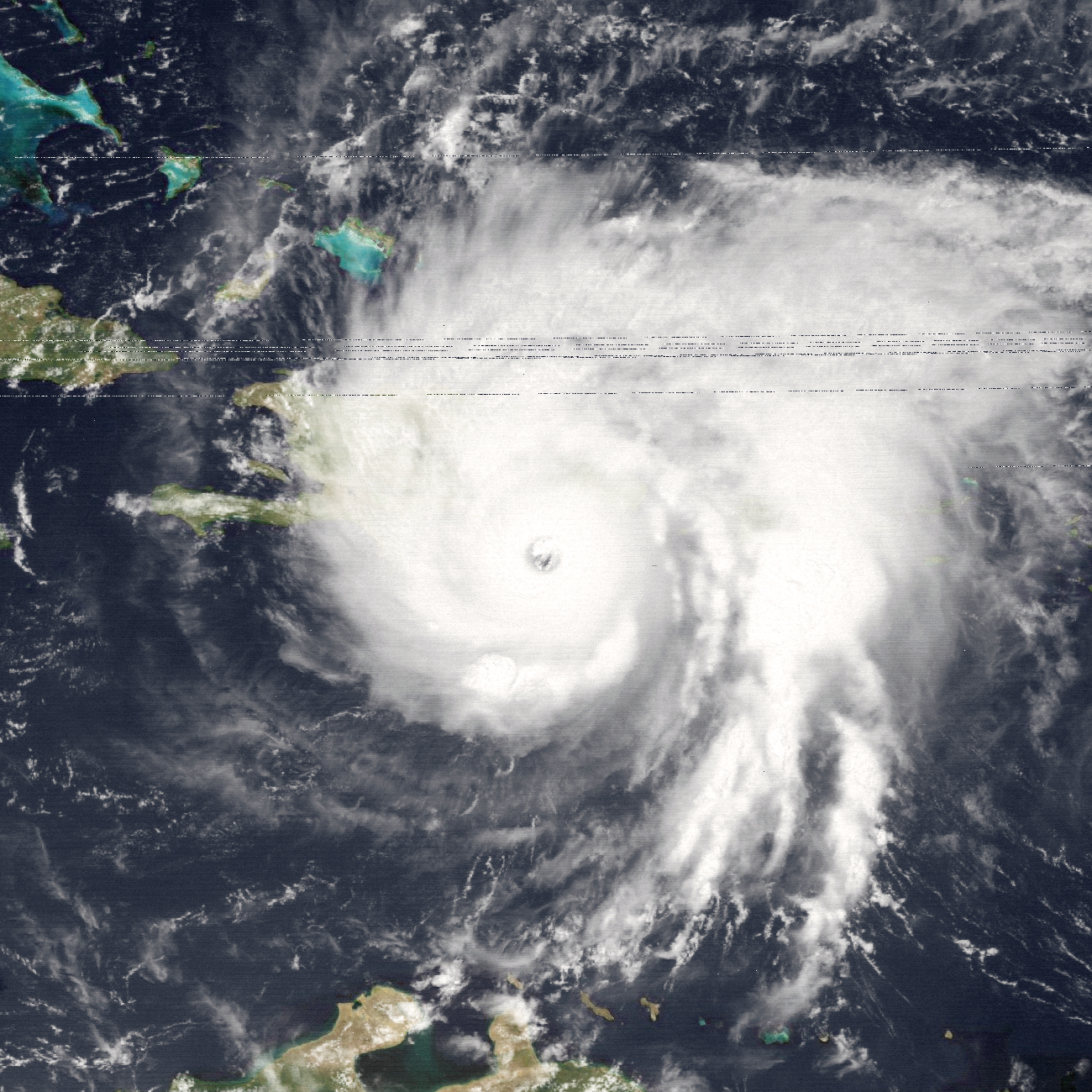
- Hurricane David at peak intensity prior to landfall in the Dominican Republic
  September 17, 1975 – Hurricane Eloise makes landfall in the northern Dominican Republic as a Category 1, causing widespread flooding throughout Hispaniola and killing 25 people. Most of the strongest winds remained off shore, though Cape Engaño recorded a wind gust of 50 miles per hour, on the northern coast of the Dominican Republic, the city of Puerto Plata was also battered with high winds and heavy rain. Although it did widespread flooding and killed 25 people, no monetary damage totals are available.
- August 31, 1979 – Hurricane David makes landfall as an extremely powerful Category 5 hurricane with 175 mph (282 km/h) winds in the Dominican Republic, bringing extreme winds and significant rainfall. Santo Domingo had winds of 125 miles per hour while other places in the Dominican Republic had Category 5 hurricane-force winds. An estimated 70 percent of crops in the Dominican Republic were destroyed. Many roads were also destroyed by heavy rainfall, especially in the villages of Jarabacoa, San Cristóbal, and Baní. River flooding from Hurricane David's torrential rainfall took its toll, when the mountainous village of Padre las Casas had a flooded river take a church and a school, killing more than several hundred people; this is just one example of what happened when Hurricane David's heavy rainfall started to get out of control. Overall 200,000 people were left homeless, 2,000 people were killed, and damages mounted up to $1 billion (1979 USD, $3.5 billion 2020 USD).
- September 6, 1979 – Hurricane Frederic makes landfall in the same areas impacted by David just a week earlier as a tropical storm, buffeting the region with several days of rainfall. Despite this, damage in the Dominican Republic was minimal.

=== 1980s ===
- August 5, 1980 – Hurricane Allen weakens to a Category 4 hurricane south of Haiti, bringing high winds and heavy rainfall. Roughly 60 percent of the coffee crop in Haiti had been completely destroyed, while in Port-au-Prince, tin roofs went flying from high winds; 41 people were killed in that city alone. Overall 835,000+ were left homeless by this storm, 227+ were killed, and $447 (1980 USD) million in damage.
- September 23, 1987 – Hurricane Emily makes landfall in between Barahona and Baní, Dominican Republic as a strong Category 2 hurricane with 110 mph (180 km/h) winds, killing three people. Upwards of 4.59 inches fell throughout the Dominican Republic, causing large mudslides which killed two. Another person was killed after stepping on a live power line. The farming industry was particularly hard hit, with more than $30 million in damage to agriculture alone. After the storm, hundreds of volunteers assisted evacuees in shelters and helped clean up efforts in the affected areas while the International Red Cross assisted those left homeless after Emily destroyed their homes. Overall there was $80.3 million in damage and three people were killed.
- September 11, 1988 – Hurricane Gilbert passes south of Hispaniola while rapidly intensifying, dropping heavy rainfall and causing flooding. In the Dominican Republic, nine were killed as rivers, such as the Yuna, overtopped their banks. The main electrical relay station in Santo Domingo was damaged, causing a temporary power outage for all of Santo Domingo. The port of Jacmel, Haiti was reportedly destroyed by ten foot waves. The government on Haiti declared a state of emergency for the entire southern peninsula of Haiti. Overall there was $91.2+ million in damage and 62 people were killed.

=== 1990s ===
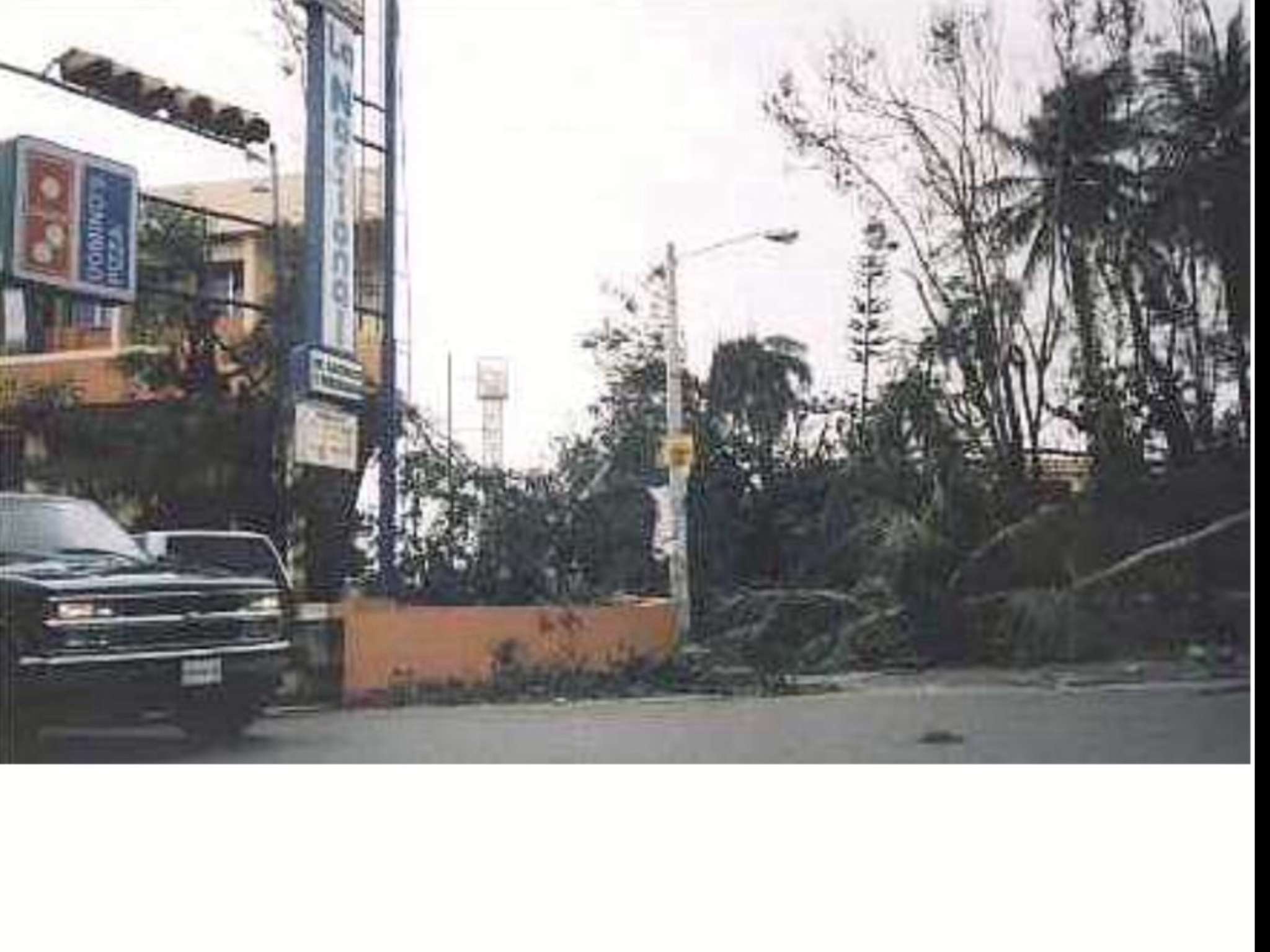
Trees toppled from Hurricane Georges' fierce winds as it moved through the Dominican Republic

- July 27, 1990 - Tropical Storm Arthur moves to the south of Hispaniola, dropping heavy rainfall and forcing Haiti to issue a tropical storm watch.
- June 1, 1993 – Tropical Depression One moves through the central Bahamas, resulting in outer rain bands lashing Haiti, killing 13 people.
- August 16, 1993 – Tropical Storm Cindy makes landfall in the Dominican Republic as a tropical depression. There was heavy rainfall; in the eastern Dominican Republic rainfall totals were 4-10 inches, overflowing rivers and causing street flooding. There was one death in Villa Altagracia when a child drowned, bringing the Dominican Republic's death toll to two people.
- September 12, 1994 - The remnants of Tropical Storm Debby pass over Hispaniola, killing three people. One station in the Dominican Republic recorded winds of 62 miles per hour (100 km/h), downing power lines and leaving hundreds of households without power. Some rivers flooded and an expressway flooded.
- November 13, 1994 - Hurricane Gordon drops heavy rainfall on Haiti, killing more than 1,000 people.
- September 10, 1996 – Hurricane Hortense moves through the Mona Passage, dropping heavy rainfall and causing hurricane-force winds, peaking at 92 miles per hour in Punta Cana. Heavy rainfall that peaked at 19.25 (489 mm) inches in San Rafael del Yuma combined with storm surge closed many roadways. Wind and rain from Hortenese damaged more than 80 percent of crops in Samana alone.
- November 20, 1996 - Hurricane Marco (1996) passes close to Hispaniola, dropping heavy rainfall. In the Dominican Republic, three people drowned north of Santo Domingo and 200 families evacuated from their homes.
- September 22, 1998 – Hurricane Georges makes landfall in the Dominican Republic with 120 (190 km/h) mph winds, causing more than $1.2 billion and killing 589 people. In Santo Domingo, strong winds destroyed 112 homes, and damaged one of the Dominican Republic's only major airports. Throughout the entire country 55 percent of the agricultural system had been destroyed while 90 percent of the plantation crop had been destroyed. Overall damage to the agriculture was $434 million (1998 USD) in the Dominican Republic.

== 2000s ==
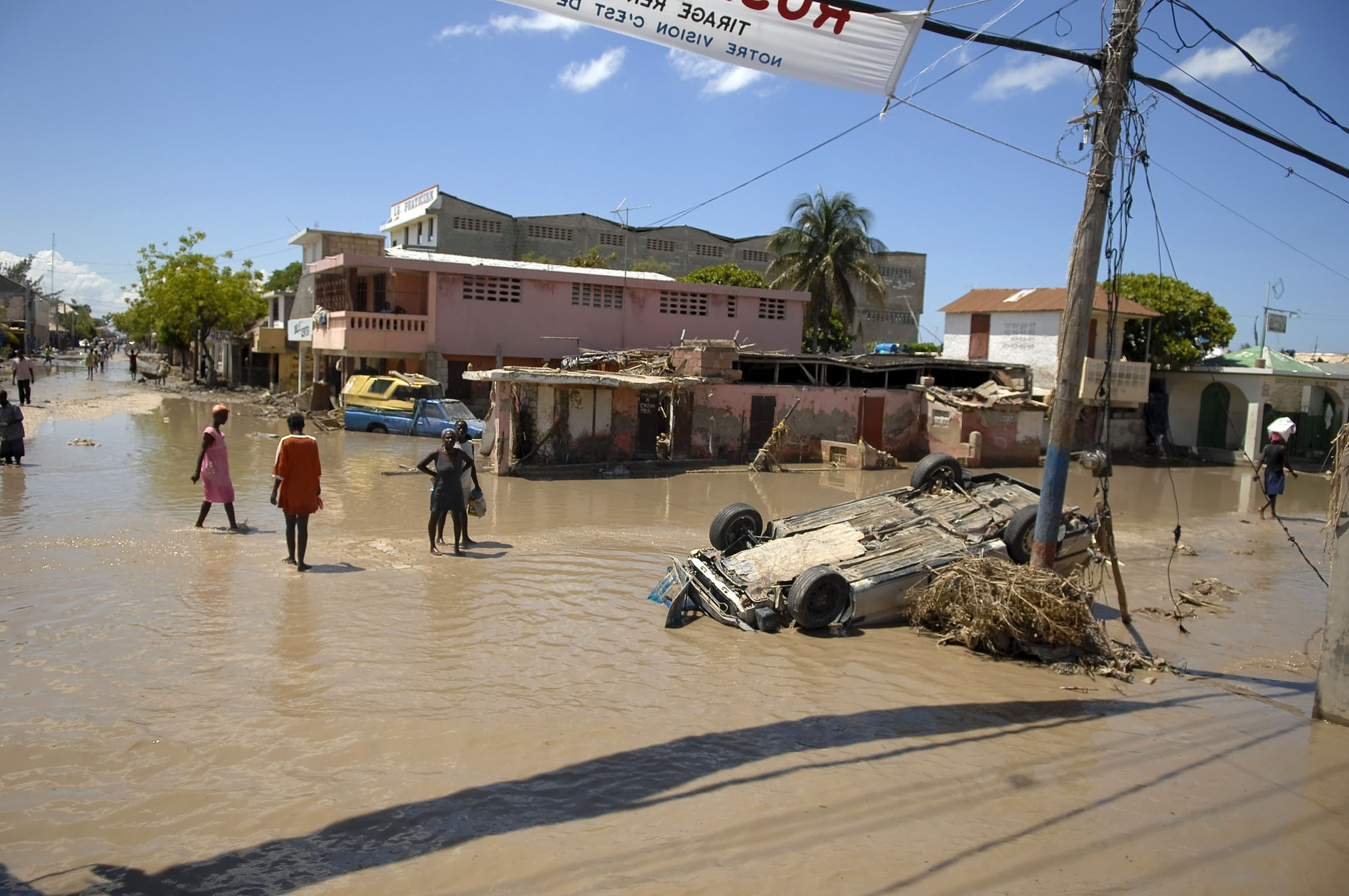
- Damage and flooding in Gonaïves, Haiti after Hurricane Jeanne
  August 23, 2000 – Hurricane Debby moves north of Hispaniola, forcing dozens of families to evacuate. High waves, heavy rainfall, and storm surge did moderate damage to buildings. In the town of Salcedo approximately 23 square miles (60 km) of banana crops were lost to the storm.
- October 6, 2001 - Hurricane Iris moves to the south of Hispaniola as a Category 1 hurricane, dropping heavy rainfall and killing three people. Rainfall from the system was up to three inches (76 millimeters), resulting in rivers overflowing their banks and forcing 35 families to evacuate their homes. Rainfall from Iris also triggered landslides, with one near Santo Domingo that decimated a house and killed a family of three, while another landslide injured two people.
- September 24, 2002 – Hurricane Lili passes to the southwest of the Tiburon Peninsula as a dissipating tropical storm, dropping heavy rainfall. Near the town of Camp-Perrin there was almost 16 inches (410 mm) of rain, making it the 4th wettest tropical cyclone in Haiti, overflowing Ravine du Sud River, ending up submerging buildings. Overall the storm killed 4 people.
- December 6, 2003 – Tropical Storm Odette makes landfall in the Jaragua National Park with winds around 60 mph (95 km/h), though winds were relatively light with a peak gust of 60 mph (95 km/h) in Santo Domingo. It also dropped heavy rain, with a peak of 9.07 inches (230 mm) causing mudslides and floods. Overall Tropical Storm Odette caused $8 million in damage and killed 10 (2 indirect), and injuring another 14.
- September 17, 2004 – Hurricane Jeanne almost stalls north of Hispaniola for several days, dropping heavy rainfall. In the northern mountains of Haiti, up to 13 inches (330 mm) of rainfall caused major flooding and huge mudslides. In the coastal town of Gonaïves around 80,000 of the town's 100,000 residents were affected. In the neighboring Dominican Republic there was also major flooding, causing more than $270 million in damage and killing over 2 dozen people. Overall, Hurricane Jeanne killed 3,000+ people, with 3,006 of them in Gonaïves and injured 5,000+ people in Hispaniola and caused more than $270 million in damage.
- October 23, 2005 – Tropical Storm Alpha makes landfall near Barahona, though causing most damage in Haiti. Most of the damage in Haiti was confined to Ouest, Sud-Est, and Grand'Anse. There, up to 7.9 inches (200 mm) caused mudslides and flooding. Overall in Haiti around 191 houses were damaged, 243 were destroyed, and 26 people were killed.
- August 28, 2006 – Hurricane Ernesto passes just to the southwest of the Tiburon Peninsula, dropping heavy rainfall throughout all of Hispaniola. On the island of La Gonave around 11 inches of rainfall fell, resulting in the destruction of 13 houses. Throughout the rest of Haiti another 59 homes were damaged, with six of them destroyed and a total of five people were killed. Also, in the Dominican Republic around 400 houses were flooded, forcing an evacuation of 1,600 people.
- August 19, 2007 - Hurricane Dean passes close to Hispaniola as a Category 4 hurricane, bringing strong squalls to Hispaniola. In the Dominican Republic, they recorded little wind but heavy rainfall which flooded the streets of Santo Domingo. The agriculture sector was not impacted as bad as the agriculture in other countries. Wave activity attracted many people and a 16-year-old boy was swept out to sea as he watched 16-foot (4.9-meter) waves. Five people were killed when their boat capsized; they were with three other people who managed to swim ashore. Another four people were injured in a sail boat after they disregarded warnings to stay in the port. 316 homes were damaged and five were destroyed as a result of rough surf on the southern coast of the Dominican Republic. Thousands of people lost power on Gonâve Island, Haiti as a result of outer bands. In Jacmel, the St. Micheal hospital had a damaged roof, resulting in leaking into the hospital. Nine people had been killed in Haiti; most of them have little details about their deaths. In the town of Bainet, the temperamental water system had been completely compromised. Several hundred homes were destroyed by landslides in Haiti.
- October 29, 2007 – Hurricane Noel passes over Haiti as a weakening tropical storm, dropping very heavy rainfall and becoming the second wettest tropical cyclone to ever impact Haiti as it dropped 25.78 inches (655 mm) of rain. In Haiti around 3,252 families were impacted as five days of rainfall caused severe flooding and large mudslides. Meanwhile, in neighboring Dominican Republic the heaviest rainfall was around 21.65 inches (550 mm), having many rivers overflow their banks, which most of the time ended up with houses filling up with water, leaving almost 65,000 people homeless. Overall the storm killed 160 people, injured 100+ people, and left around 59 people missing.
- December 11, 2007 – Tropical Storm Olga makes landfall near Punta Cana with winds around 60 (95 km/h) mph, dropping heavy rainfall. The heavy rainfall led to flooding of the Yaque del Norte River, and initially opposing a threat to the Bao-Tavera Dams and that it could fail, maybe killing thousands of people in the Santiago Province, so they released all six floodgates, releasing 1.6 million gallons of water and creating a 66 feet tall wave, catching many people off guard as it was the middle of the night, killing 35 and leaving homes in seven towns flooded. Overall the storm killed 39 people and caused $45 million in damage ($1.5 billion DRP;$56 million 2020 USD).
- August 15, 2008 – Tropical Storm Fay (2008) makes landfall in the Dominican Republic shortly after strengthening into a tropical storm, dropping heavy rainfall over the region which caused flooding, cancelling flights in and out of the region. In Haiti winds damaged crops including the rice field and banana crop. Overall 14 people were killed in Hispaniola.
- August 26, 2008 – Hurricane Gustav makes landfall as a minimal hurricane in Haiti around 10 miles away from the town of Jacmel, causing large mudslides. In the Dominican Republic a landslide killed 8 people and injured 2 others. Also in the Dominican Republic 1,239 homes were reported damaged and 12 homes had been destroyed. Much of Jacmel, Haiti was also flooded. In Benet, a landslide killed one person. Overall the storm killed 85 people, destroyed 2,112 homes, and damaged another 9,189.
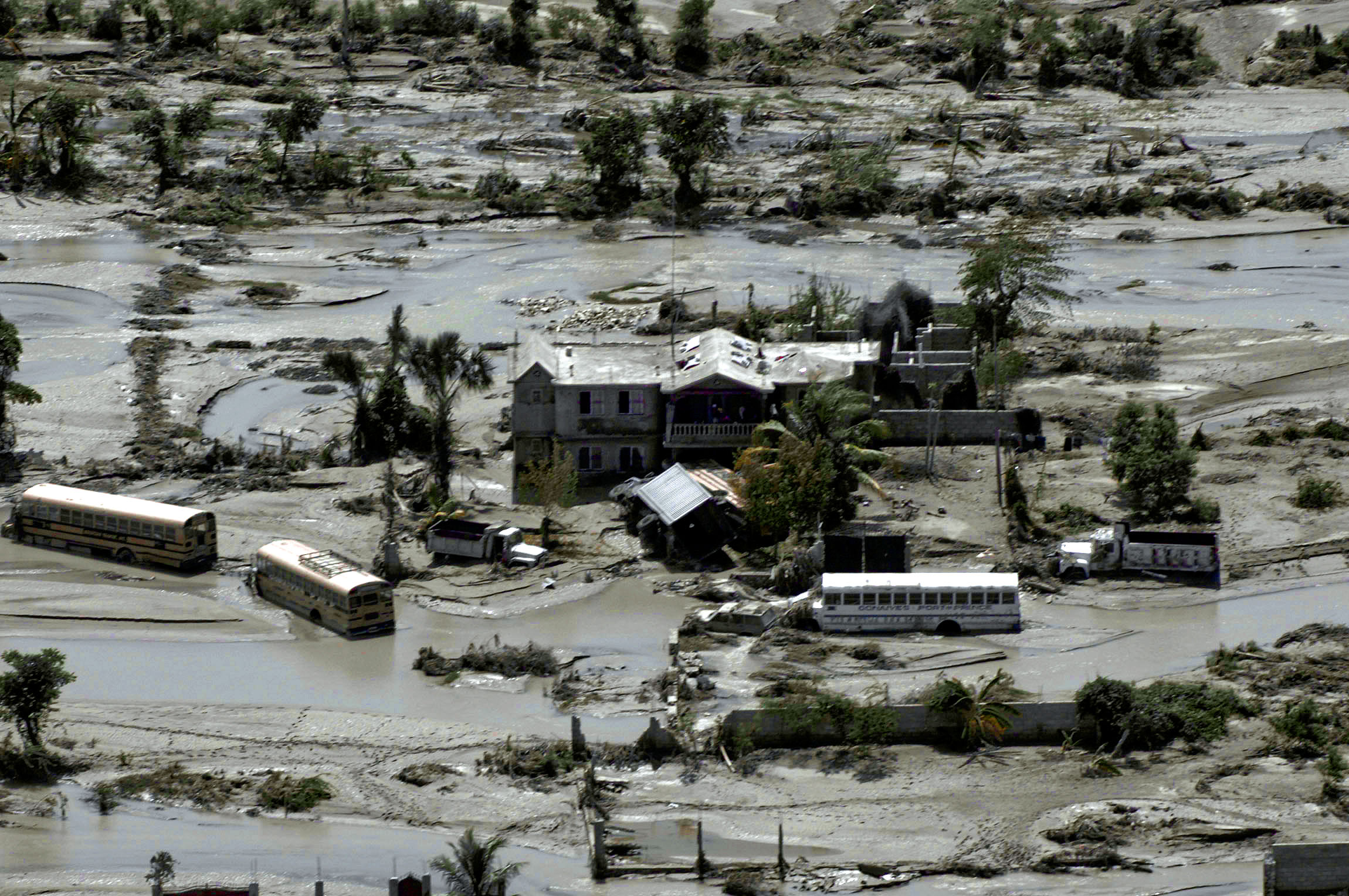
- A school near Port-au-Prince that was badly damaged by Hurricane Ike
  September 3, 2008 – Hurricane Hanna (2008) slowly moves north of Haiti, dropping up to a foot of rain in already saturated ground from Hurricane Gustav and Tropical Storm Fay (2008). The heavy rain caused very large mudslides and in the town of Gonaïves, which was also hard hit during Hurricane Jeanne, was flooded with up to 2 meters (6.6 feet) of water. By September 4, the Haitian government reported up to 529 deaths, as people started to evacuate to shelters during the aftermath and people even slept on their roofs to protect themselves from looters. Bridges in and out of Gonaïves were also destroyed, limiting transportation.
- September 6, 2008 - Hurricane Ike drops torrential rainfall in Hispaniola on already saturated ground, leaving hundreds of thousands of people homeless and killing 76 people. In Gonaïves, the last bridge standing had been washed away, slowing relief efforts and causing a deep humanitarian and food crisis in Gonaïves. Most of the deaths from Hurricane Ike in Haiti were in the seaside commune of Cabaret, which was flooded and had been destroyed by mudslides. The Prime Minister of Haiti, or Michèle Pierre-Louis, was calling for help from other countries, as four storms have impacted Haiti in less than three weeks, killing 550 people and leaving as many as one million people homeless. Michèle also said that because Gonaïves had been completely destroyed by the four storms, they may have to rebuild the city in a new place.

=== 2010s ===
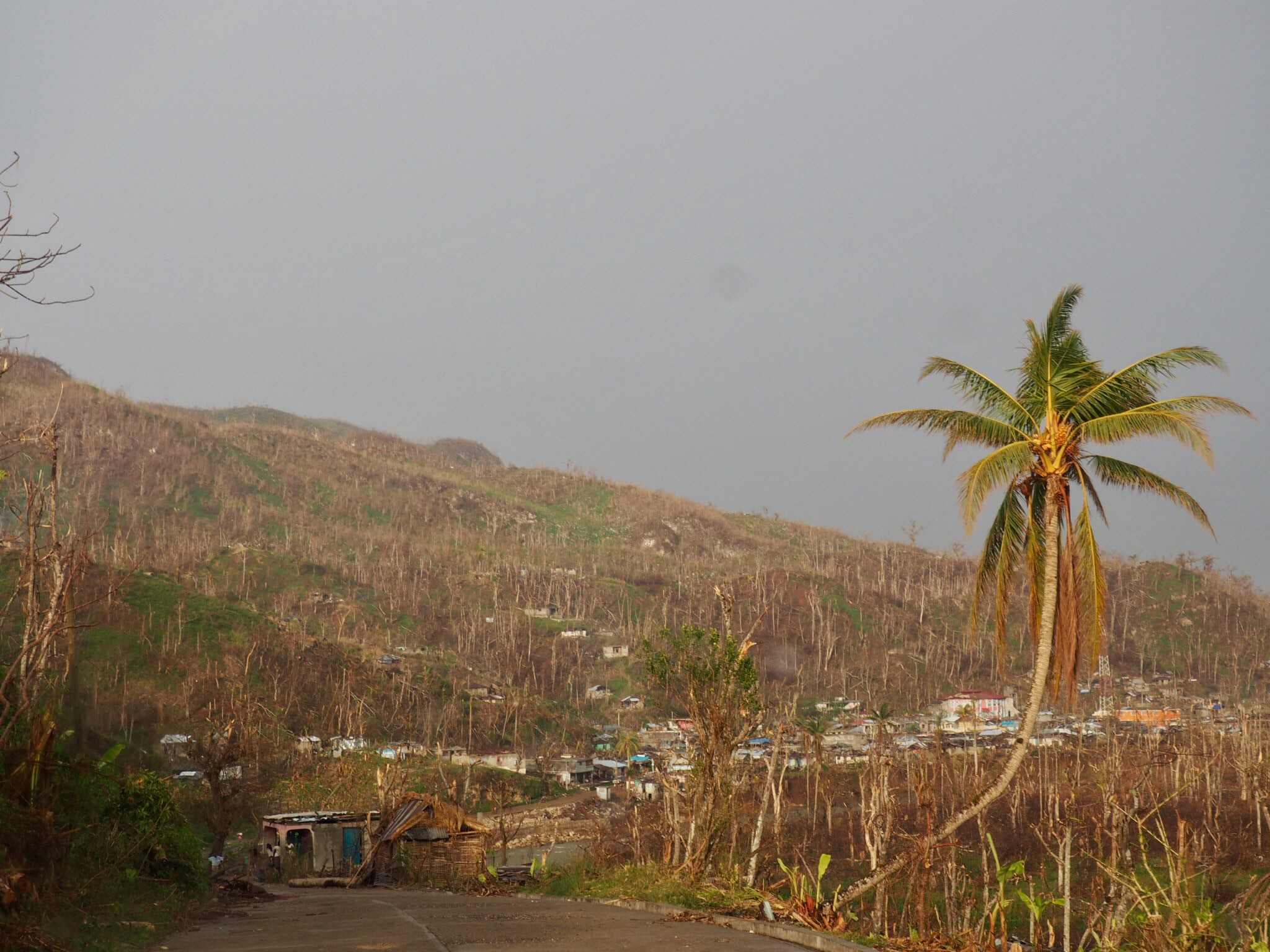
Damage in the Tiburon Peninsula of Haiti following Hurricane Matthew.

- June 22, 2010 - The tropical wave that would later lead to the formation of Hurricane Alex drops heavy rainfall in Hispaniola, killing one person and leaving another missing. More than 3,000 people were evacuated, mostly due to swollen rivers. In Santo Domingo, one person was killed and another went missing, while 160 houses were flooded. Also, in San Juan de la Maguana, 550 homes were underwater. In nearby Haiti, Gonaïves reported minor flooding.
- November 5, 2010 – Hurricane Tomas becomes a hurricane just miles away from Haiti, flooding one of Haiti's largest refugee camps after the 2010 Haiti earthquake caused major damage and killed more than 200,000 people. Tropical-storm-force winds buffed much of the region too, causing damage. By the evening of November 8, 20 people were confirmed dead and 30,000 people were in shelters. Overall 35 people were killed.
- August 4, 2011 - Tropical Storm Emily's remnants move over Hispaniola, dropping 20 inches of rainfall and killing four people. Consecutive hours of rainfall flooded many rivers and forced them to break their banks, though there was no reported significant damage in areas bordering the river. Rough waves forming from offshore squalls affected boating operations and damaged seaside homes. Severe flooding and mudslides left 56 communities isolated from the outside world. More than 7,534 people were displaced, of which 1,549 had been seeking refuge in shelters. In Haiti, Emily spared the destruction they forecasted because Emily had dissipated. Still, 235 people were evacuated in Jacmel and Tabarre, 65 prisoners were evacuated in Gonaïves and Miragoâne, and 300 residents were evacuated in Artibonite by the civil protection team. Rainfall had damaged over 300 homes, and a body was found in a ravine near Les Cayes; their death is unknown while another person was injured after being hit with a falling tree. High winds caused damage to property in Jacmel and Léogâne.
- August 22, 2011 – Hurricane Irene moves just north of Hispaniola as a Category 1 hurricane, producing gales and rainfall. In the Dominican Republic the highest reported winds were in Cibao, downing trees and power poles. Swollen rivers flooded homes and buildings as Irene dropped rain all over the region. In San Cristóbal a bride collapsed because of heavy rainfall saturating the soil. Overall 2,929 households were affected, with 16 damaged beyond repair, 8 people were killed, and damage was $1 billion DRP ($30 million USD).
- August 25, 2012 – Hurricane Isaac makes landfall in Haiti with 70 mph (110 km/h) winds, causing floods and strong winds. As many as 5,000 people were evacuated in Haiti from their tents as entire camps collapsed from wind and rain. The President, Michel Martelly cancelled his trip to Japan so he could coordinate disaster efforts. Agricultural damage in Haiti accounted up to $242 million in damage while damage to the electrical infrastructure was around $7.9 million ($336 million gourdes) in damage and 24 people were killed, with some reports up to 29 deaths. In the Dominican Republic 5 people were killed and there were some reports of power outages. Overall, Hurricane Isaac caused $280 million in damage and killed 29 people in Hispaniola.
- October 25, 2012 – Hurricane Sandy passes offshore while smashing Cuba, dropping more than four days of rainfall on Hispaniola, causing large mudslides and major flooding. Tents and buildings all over Haiti in refugee camps were flooded, almost like what Hurricane Isaac had done earlier that year. Crops were also severely damage or destroyed all over Haiti, making the country sign an appeal for emergency aid. In Port-au-Prince, major damages occurred after flooding from heavy rains and it was reported that "the whole south part of the country is under water". Overall there was $780 million in damage and 56 deaths.
- August 3, 2014 – Hurricane Bertha (2014) moves through the Mona Passage, dropping heavy rain which peaked at 4.7 inches in Bayaguana. Following the formation of Tropical Storm Bertha the Ministry of Public Works and Communications in the Dominican Republic activated emergency operations. Also, the rains in the Dominican Republic caused significant flooding, especially near the Soco River.
- August 28, 2015 – Tropical Storm Erika's remnants make landfall in the Dominican Republic, dropping intense rains. At one station in Barahona they reported 24.26 (616 mm) inches of rain, with 8.8 (220 mm) inches in just one hour, though surrounding areas did not report rain as intense. In Azua gusts got up to 50 mph, causing damage to banana crops. Overall, Tropical Storm Erika caused $8.91 million ($400 million DRP) in damage and killed 5 people.
- August 1, 2016 – Hurricane Earl's precursor moves south of the Dominican Republic, causing strong winds and heavy rainfall, triggering mudslides. In northeastern Nagua, winds knocked a power line onto a bus which resulted in triggering a fire which killed six people and injured another 12. In Samaná Bay a boat with 9 excursionists flipped over, of the 9 people only a woman and the captain were found alive. Overall 13 people were killed.
- October 4, 2016 – Hurricane Matthew makes landfall in Haiti with powerful and extremely dangerous winds that were clocked at more than 150 miles per hour (240 km/h), causing destruction all over the Tiburon Peninsula in southwestern Haiti. In southern spots of Haiti there was from 20 to 40 inches (510–1,020 mm) of rainfall, causing huge mudslides and major floods. UNOSAT reported that 1.125 million people were affected by hurricane-force winds (74 mph+, 119 km/h+) while in Ouest, a department in Haiti which holds the capital of Port-au-Prince, reported that nearly four million people had winds in excess of 37 mph (60 km/h). The storm surge from Hurricane Matthew was estimated at 9.8 feet (3 meters), flooding at least 11 municipalities. Overall damage was $2.8 billion and 546 deaths were reported, though it was initially estimated as high as 1,600 people.
- September 7, 2017 – Hurricane Irma moves north of Hispaniola, dropping heavy rainfall and strong winds. In the Dajabón River a bridge connecting the two country's of Haiti and the Dominican Republic fell down because of winds and rains. In Nagua high waves from Irma caused damage and sometimes even destroyed buildings. 55,000 soldiers were deployed to the Dominican Republic to help with recovery efforts and by late September 7 the government had counted 2,721 damaged homes. In Haiti heavy rainfall caused up to one meter of flooding and mudslides which destroyed homes and crops.
- September 22, 2017 – Hurricane Maria moves north of Hispaniola as a major hurricane, causing heavy rainfall and strong winds which triggered mudslides. At its peak around 60,000 people were without power. The heavy rainfall caused by Maria resulted in floods and mudslides, blocking roads and isolated 38 communities. Five people were killed in the Dominican Republic; four were killed when floods took them away and one was killed by a mudslide. In Haiti three deaths were reported, one was a 45-year-old man that was killed by trying to cross a river in the commune of Limbe which is in the department of Nord while in the commune of Cornillon a man and women were killed; the reason of their deaths remain unknown. Overall damage was $63 million ($3 billion DRP) and eight people were killed.
- July 12, 2018 – Hurricane Beryl's remnants hit the Dominican Republic with heavy rain, taking out power to 130,000 people and the entire city of Santo Domingo. In San Cristóbal heavy rain flooded 700 homes along with a newly opened hospital. Also in San Cristóbal strong winds collapsed walls in two schools. 75 aqueducts were also knocked out of service through the entire country and around 8,000 people were left homeless in the country. Overall 1,586 homes were damaged by floods along with four destroyed homes.

=== 2020s ===
- July 30, 2020 – Hurricane Isaias makes landfall around Punta Cana with 60 (95 km/h) mile per hour winds. One person is killed in the Dominican Republic due to a downed wire.
- August 23, 2020 – Hurricane Laura passes over Hispaniola. Four people were killed in the Dominican Republic, while 31 were killed in Haiti. Laura also caused more than 100,000 people to lose power in the Dominican Republic. Downed trees and flooding were reported in both countries.
- September 19, 2022 - Hurricane Fiona makes landfall near Boca de Yuma as a Category 1 hurricane, bringing strong winds and heavy rains to the Dominican Republic. Two people were killed by the hurricane, and resulted in a loss of US$375 million (20 billion pesos).
- August 23, 2023 - Hurricane Franklin makes landfall near Barahona, Dominican Republic as a weak tropical storm. The storm brought some flooding to Hispaniola before going out into the Atlantic, killing 3 in the Dominican Republic and caused US$90 million in damage.
- July 3, 2024 - Hurricane Beryl produces gusty winds and rough surf in the Dominican Republic. The hurricane displaces 89 people and cuts service to 57 aqueducts. Large waves scatter debris on a section of the Las Américas Highway in Santo Domingo. Storm surge flooding is reported in the neighborhood of Ciudad Nueva, detouring traffic. Four dwellings are destroyed by storm surge in La Ciénaga, Barahona, where an additional three houses are damaged. A landslide destroys a home in La Zurza. Multiple beachfront shops in Boca Chica are damaged by rough waves. The hurricane causes minimal damage in neighboring Haiti. Roads and agricultural lands along the southern coast are flooded. Fishing boats and other properties are also impacted.

== Climatology ==
Storms Affecting Hispaniola by month
| Month | Number of Storms |
|---|---|
| May | 1 |
| June | 2 |
| July | 5 |
| August | 22 |
| September | 22 |
| October | 9 |
| November | 4 |
| December | 2 |
| Overall | 67 |

Storms affecting Hispaniola by period
| Period | Number of storms |
|---|---|
| 1800s | 3 |
| 1900-49 | 11 |
| 1950s | 3 |
| 1960s | 4 |
| 1970s | 3 |
| 1980s | 3 |
| 1990s | 8 |
| 2000s | 14 |
| 2010s | 13 |
| 2020s | 5 |
| Overall | 67 |

== Wettest storms ==
The following is a list of the wettest tropical cyclones in Hispaniola.

Wettest tropical cyclones and their remnants in Hispaniola Highest-known totals
| Precipitation | | | Storm | Location | Ref. |
| Rank | mm | in | Storm | Location | Ref. |
|---|---|---|---|---|---|
| 1 | 1,447.8 | 57.00 | Flora 1963 | Miragoâne | |
| 2 | 905.0 | 35.63 | Noel 2007 | Polo Barahona | |
| 3 | 604.5 | 23.80 | Matthew 2016 | Anse-á-Veau | |
| 4 | 598.0 | 23.54 | Cleo 1964 | Polo | |
| 5 | 528.0 | 20.79 | Emily 2011 | Neyba | |
| 6 | 505.2 | 19.89 | Jeanne 2004 | Isla Saona | |
| 7 | 479.8 | 18.89 | Inez 1966 | Polo | |
| 8 | 445.5 | 17.54 | Hurricane Four 1944 | Hondo Valle | |
| 9 | 410.0 | 16.14 | Lili 2002 | Camp Perrin | |
| 10 | 359.9 | 14.17 | Hanna 2008 | Oviedo | |

== Deadly storms ==
The following are a list of Atlantic hurricanes that caused fatalities in Hispaniola.

| Name | Year | Number of Deaths |
|---|---|---|
| Flora | 1963 | 3,900-5,400 |
| Jeanne | 2004 | 3,008 |
| San Zenón | 1930 | 2,000-8,000 |
| David | 1979 | 2,000 |
| Jérémie | 1935 | 2,000 |
| Gordon | 1994 | 1,127 |
| Inez | 1966 | 850+ |
| Georges | 1998 | 589 |
| Matthew | 2016 | 546 |
| Hanna | 2008 | 529 |
| Hazel | 1954 | 469 |
| Allen | 1980 | 227+ |
| Noel | 2007 | 219 |
| Cleo | 1964 | 139 |
| Gustav | 2008 | 93 |
| Ike | 2008 | 76 |
| Gilbert | 1988 | 62 |
| Sandy | 2012 | 56 |
| Melissa | 2025 | 47 |
| Olga | 2007 | 39 |
| Laura | 2020 | 35 |
| Tomas | 2010 | 35 |
| Ella | 1958 | 33 |
| Isaac | 2012 | 29 |
| Alpha | 2005 | 26 |
| Eloise | 1975 | 25 |
| Hortense | 1996 | 24 |
| Ten | 1949 | 15 |
| Fay | 2008 | 14 |
| Earl | 2016 | 13 |
| One | 1993 | 13 |
| Odette | 2003 | 10 |
| Maria | 2017 | 8 |
| Irene | 2011 | 8 |
| Katie | 1955 | 7 |
| Dean | 2007 | 6 |
| Nicole | 2022 | 6 |
| Ernesto | 2006 | 5 |
| Erika | 2015 | 5 |
| Lili | 2002 | 4 |
| Iris | 2001 | 3 |
| Emily | 1987 | 3 |
| Cindy | 1993 | 2 |
| Beulah | 1967 | 2 |
| Fiona | 2022 | 2 |
| Alex | 2010 | 1 |
| Irma | 2017 | 1 |
| Isaias | 2020 | 1 |

== See also ==
- List of Florida hurricanes (1975-1999)
- List of Florida hurricanes (2000-present)
- List of Cuba hurricanes
- Hurricanes in the Bahama Archipelago
