= El Peñón =

El Peñón (Spanish: the rock) may refer to:

- El Peñón, Dominican Republic, a town in the Barahona province of the Dominican Republic.
- El Peñón (Catamarca), a village and municipality in Catamarca Province in northwestern Argentina.
- El Peñón, Bolívar, a town and municipality located in the Bolívar Department, northern Colombia.
- El Peñón, Cundinamarca, a town and municipality of Colombia in the department of Cundinamarca
- El Peñón, Santander, a town and municipality in the Santander Department in northeastern Colombia.
- El Peñón (Antarctica), a monolithic formation on Livingston Island in the South Shetland Islands, Antarctica.
- El Peñón mine, one of the largest gold mines in Chile and in the world.

== See also ==
- El Peñón de las Ánimas, a Mexican movie of 1942, directed by Miguel Zacarías
- El Peñon de Guatape (monolith), a monolithic formation located at the municipality of Guatape in Antioquia, Colombia
- Peñón
