= Patos =

Patos or Los Patos may refer to:

- Patos, Albania, a town
- Patos, Brazil, a municipality
- Los Patos, Barahona, Dominican Republic, a small town
- Los Patos, a mountain in the Andes between Argentina and Chile
- Paso de Los Patos, a mountain pass in the Andes between Argentina and Chile
- Dos Patos River (disambiguation)
- Río de los Patos, Argentina, a river
- Lagoa dos Patos, Brazil, a lagoon
- Canal dos Patos (Macau), a short canal
- Patos Island, Washington, United States
- Patos Island (Venezuela)
- Roman Catholic Diocese of Patos, Brazil

== See also ==
- Pato (disambiguation)
