= Hurricane Ella (1958) =

Category 2 Atlantic hurricane in 1958

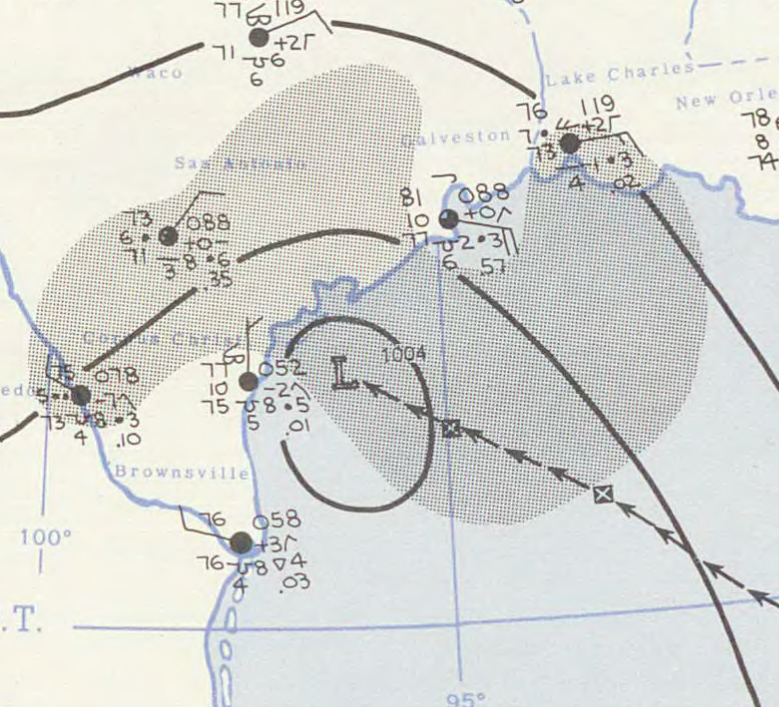
- Surface weather analysis of Hurricane Ella on September 6

Meteorological history
- Formed: August 30, 1958
- Dissipated: September 6, 1958

Category 2 hurricane
- 1-minute sustained (SSHWS/NWS)
- Highest winds: 110 mph (175 km/h)
- Lowest pressure: 983 mbar (hPa); 29.03 inHg

Overall effects
- Fatalities: 36 direct
- Damage: $200,000 (1958 USD)
- Areas affected: Leeward Islands, Virgin Islands, Puerto Rico, Dominican Republic, Haiti, Cuba, Florida, Texas
- IBTrACS
- Part of the 1958 Atlantic hurricane season

Hurricane Ella brought flooding to the Greater Antilles and Texas in September 1958. The fifth named storm and third hurricane of the annual season, Ella developed from a tropical wave located just east of the Lesser Antilles on August 30. Initially a tropical depression, it strengthened into Tropical Storm Ella six hours later. The system crossed the Leeward Islands and entered the Caribbean Sea late on August 30. Ella headed westward and by August 31, intensified into a Category 1 hurricane. Hours later, it strengthened into a Category 2 hurricane on the Saffir–Simpson hurricane wind scale. The storm curved northwestward while south of Hispaniola and as a result, struck the Tiburon Peninsula of Haiti on September 1. Flooding in that country killed 30 people in Aux Cayes and left 3 other missing. Additionally, thousands were left homeless, about one-third of crops were washed out, and numerous cattle were killed.

After re-emerging into the Caribbean Sea, Ella made landfall on September 2, near Santiago de Cuba, Cuba. Heavy rainfall lead to flooding, which in turn caused hundreds to flee their homes, and resulted in 5 fatalities. Hundreds of livestock drowned, and telephone and telegraph services were disrupted in many areas. The storm became disorganized while moving across the southern coast of Cuba and weakened to a tropical storm by later on September 2. Ella reached the Gulf of Mexico on September 4 and briefly re-strengthened. However, it began to weaken again while approaching the Gulf Coast of the United States. The storm made landfall as a weak tropical storm near Corpus Christi, Texas on September 6. It rapidly weakened inland and dissipated later that day. Rainfall and rough surf caused both inland and coastal flooding in Texas. Offshore, the captain of a snapper boat fell overboard and went missing; he was later presumed to have drowned.

== Meteorological history ==
Map plotting the storm's track and intensity, according to the Saffir–Simpson scale Map key Saffir–Simpson scale Tropical depression (≤38 mph, ≤62 km/h) Tropical storm (39–73 mph, 63–118 km/h) Category 1 (74–95 mph, 119–153 km/h) Category 2 (96–110 mph, 154–177 km/h) Category 3 (111–129 mph, 178–208 km/h) Category 4 (130–156 mph, 209–251 km/h) Category 5 (≥157 mph, ≥252 km/h) Unknown Storm type Tropical cyclone Subtropical cyclone Extratropical cyclone, remnant low, tropical disturbance, or monsoon depression

A tropical wave was first observed near 50°W on August 29. Later that day, reconnaissance aircraft flight reported a wind shirt and above average shower and thunderstorm activity, but no low-level circulation. At 0600 UTC on August 30, a tropical depression developed just east of the Lesser Antilles. Six hours later, the depression strengthened into Tropical Storm Ella. The storm moved through the Leeward Islands and entered the Caribbean Sea late on August 30. A reconnaissance aircraft into Ella reported sustained winds between 55 and 60 mph (95 km/h). It was around that time that the Weather Bureau Office in San Juan, Puerto Rico began issuing bulletins and advisories. Ella strengthened into a Category 1 hurricane at 1200 UTC on August 31, six hours later, before becoming a Category 2 hurricane. On September 1, Ella curved west-northwestward, and by later that day, made landfall on the Tiburon Peninsula of Haiti with winds of 110 mph (175 km/h). However, the storm was operationally thought to have remained offshore.

Ella re-emerged into the Caribbean Sea on September 1, and on September 2, the storm made landfall near Santiago de Cuba, Cuba as a Category 1 Hurricane. Rough terrain over the island caused Ella to weaken to a Category 1 hurricane on September 2. Later that day, it further weakened to a tropical storm. The storm re-strengthened to 70 mph (110 km/h) before reaching the Gulf of Mexico on September 4. Ella maintained this intensity for approximately 48 hours while moving west-northwestward, but began to weaken again on September 6. Hours later, the storm made landfall near Corpus Christi, Texas with winds of 45 mph (75 km/h). It weakened back to a tropical depression and dissipated by late on September 6.

== Preparations and impact ==
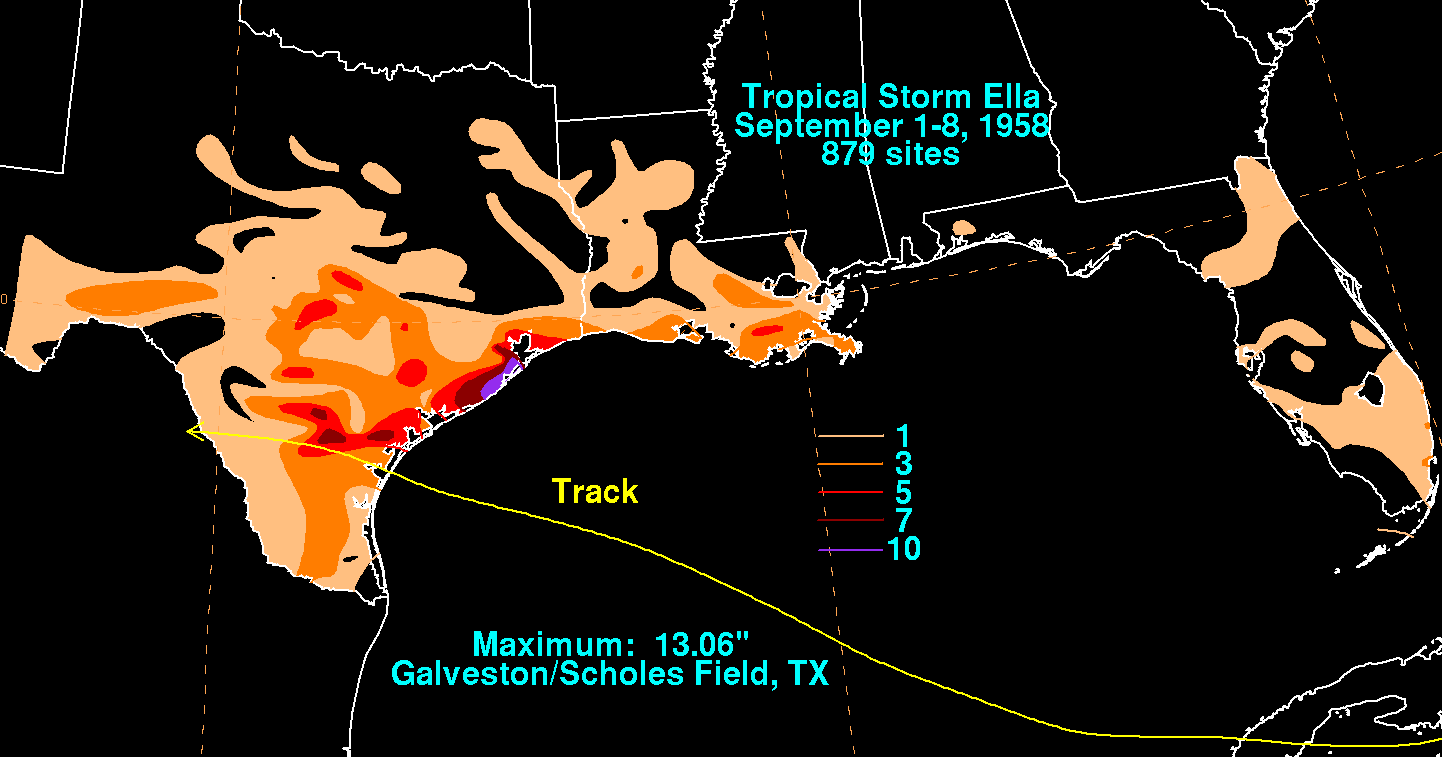
Rainfall accumulations from Hurricane Ella in the United States

Wind gusts in Puerto Rico and the Virgin Islands were between 40 and 50 mph (64 and 80 km/h). Heavy rainfall in the former caused local flooding. Damage was minor in both locations, confined mostly to crops. In preparation for Ella on the island of Hispaniola, a hurricane warning was issued from Barahona, Dominican Republic, and along the Haitian coastline to Saint-Marc. Ella brought heavy rains, peaking at 9.63 in (245 mm) in Polo, Barahona. Damage from the resultant flooding in southwestern Dominican Republic reached $100,000. Additionally, wind gusts up to 37 mph (60 km/h) were reported in Santo Domingo. Heavy precipitation in Haiti caused flash floods that killed 30 people near Aux Cayes, and three other people were listed as missing. As much as 5 to 6 ft (1.5 to 1.8 m) of water covered roads in low-lying areas. A combination of strong winds and flooding also rendered thousands homeless. Damage to agriculture was heavy, with numerous cattle killed and about one-third of crops washed out, mostly to bananas and sugar cane. There was no monetary damage estimate, though losses in Haiti were noted to have been "considerable".

Flooding also occurred in Cuba. Hundreds were evacuated from their homes in four different provinces in Cuba, including 400 peasant families in Oriente Province. Near Santiago de Cuba, 25 houses were swept away after the Bayamo River overflowed. In the same area, a woman and her four sons drowned due to the swollen river. Additionally, a body of a man was recovered near Santa Cruz del Sur. Hundreds of livestock drowned, and telephone and telegraph services were disrupted in many areas. Losses in Cuba were estimated to have reached $100,000. Ella had a role in the Cuban Revolution as the government troops of Fulgencio Batista y Zaldívar stayed in their barracks during the storm while the rebels made progress under cover of Ella. Later, when the guerrillas heard about Hurricane Fifi on the radio, Che Guevara taught his illiterate comrades that entities like tropical cyclones are named in alphabetical order.

The outer bands of Ella produced gale-force winds in the Florida Keys, causing damage mainly to antennas, fences, shrubbery, and signs. Winds on Stock Island damaged and overturned 4 trailers. Further north in Miami, a freighter was disabled and had to be towed in to port by the United States Coast Guard. Due to fears of a storm similar to Hurricane Audrey in the previous year, some residents evacuated southwestern Louisiana. An estimated 1,500 fled inland as Ella approached, leaving only 100 people to ride out the storm. In Louisiana, squalls from Ella caused the collision of two ocean-bound freighters along the Mississippi River near New Orleans. Impact elsewhere in Louisiana was limited to minor damage to rice crops in the southwestern portion of the state. On 35 oil platforms offshore of Houston, Texas, 1,400 people were alerted about possible evacuations if Ella were to approach the area. Along the coast, there were evacuations in Indianola, Port Alto, Port O'Connor, and Sabine Pass. Ella brought heavy rains to eastern and southern Texas, including 13.1 in (330 mm) in Galveston. Precipitation brought minor flooding to low-lying areas of the Bolivar Peninsula, Galveston Island, Kemah, La Marque, the Matagorda Peninsula, Seabrook, and Texas City. Ella also brought swells to the coast of Texas. A portion of Texas State Highway 87 was closed due to inundation between Sabine Pass and High Island. Further south, tidal flooding along Texas State Highway 316 caused the closure of the portion near Indianola. Offshore, a 65 ft (20 m) shrimp trawler sank during the storm, after being smashed against the rocks near Galveston. The crew fled to the life boats and were later rescued by a United States Coast Guard Patrol Vessel. The captain of the snapper boat E. W. Fowler went missing after he was washed overboard; the man was later presumed to have drowned.

== See also ==
- Tropical cyclone
- Other storms named Ella
