= El Cachón =

- Location within the Dominican Republic
- Coordinates: 18°15′0″N 71°10′48″W
- Country: Dominican Republic
- Province: Barahona

Population (2008)
  - Total: 1 990

El Cachón is a town in the Barahona province of the Dominican Republic.

== Sources ==
- World Gazeteer: Dominican Republic – World-Gazetteer.com
