= Los Patos, Dominican Republic =

Coordinates: 17.9571°N 71.1857°W

The Los Patos river and village are located in the Barahona Province of the Dominican Republic, near the town of Paraíso. With just 61 meters — depending on the tide — it is the shortest river on the island and among the shortest rivers in the world.

The village itself lives from fishing and local tourism. On the weekends the river is a popular bathing spot due to its cold temperatures. The name Los Patos ("the ducks") is derived from the unusually large number of ducks early explorers encountered at this specific river. For a long time the ducks of Los Patos were extinct, until the local tourism board brought in a large number of Muscovy ducks to repopulate the river. Dominican dictator Rafael Trujillo, once nicknamed it "Los Chorros De Oro."
