= Pato (disambiguation) =

Pato is a sport similar to polo played on horseback.

Pato or el Pato may also refer to:

== Geography ==
- Pato, Nepal, a village development committee
- El Pato Air Base, Peru

== People ==
=== Given name ===
- Pato Banton, English reggae singer and toaster born Patrick Murray (born 1961)
- Pato Kakaraya, politician in Papua New Guinea

=== Surname ===
- Chus Pato (born 1955), Galician writer and political activist
- Cristina Pato (born 1980), Galician bagpiper, pianist and composer
- Gladys Lomafu Pato (born 1930), Swazi short story writer
- Rimbink Pato, Papua New Guinean constitutional lawyer and politician

=== Nickname or stage name ===
- Ousmane Barry (born 1991), Guinean footballer
- Pato Hoffmann (born 1956), Bolivian actor and theater director
- Alexandre Pato (born 1989), Brazilian footballer
- Claudio Strunz (born 1971), Argentine thrash metal drummer
- Roland Vargas-Aguilera (born 1979), Bolivian footballer
- As a diminutive of "Patricio" or "Patrice" (Latin equivalents of "Patrick")
  - Pato Margetic (born 1960), Argentine footballer
  - Pato O'Ward (born 1999), Mexican racing driver
  - Patrice Wilson, Nigerian-American music producer, singer and songwriter
- el Pato ("the Duck"), nickname of:
  - Roberto Abbondanzieri (born 1972), Argentine football goalkeeper
  - Ángel Cabrera (born 1969), Argentine golfer
  - Ubaldo Fillol (born 1950), Argentine football coach and former goalkeeper
  - Patricio Galaz (born 1976), Chilean footballer
  - Juan Manuel Silva (born 1972), Argentine racing driver

== Other uses ==
- Tervakosken Pato, a football club based in Tervakoski, Finland
- AVE Class 102, a high-speed train nicknamed "Pato" in Spanish
- Pato, a character in Pocoyo, a Spanish children's show

== See also ==
- Patos (disambiguation)
