= Fundación, Dominican Republic =

Fundación
- Location within the Dominican Republic
- Coordinates: 18°17′10″N 71°11′02″W
- Country: Dominican Republic
- Province: Barahona

Area
  - Total: 52.59 km^{2} (20.31 sq mi)

Population (2015)
  - Total: 8,122
  - Density: 154.4/km^{2} (400.0/sq mi)

Fundación is a town in the Barahona province of the Dominican Republic.

== Sources ==
- World Gazeteer: Dominican Republic – World-Gazetteer.com
