= Jaquimeyes =

- Location within the Dominican Republic
- Coordinates: 18°19′12″N 71°10′12″W
- Country: Dominican Republic
- Province: Barahona

Area
  - Total: 178.63 km^{2} (68.97 sq mi)

Population (2012)
  - Total: 4,144
  - Density: 23.20/km^{2} (60.08/sq mi)

Jaquimeyes is a town in the Barahona province of the Dominican Republic.

== Sources ==
- – World-Gazetteer.com
