= Hurricane Inez =

Category 5 Atlantic hurricane in 1966

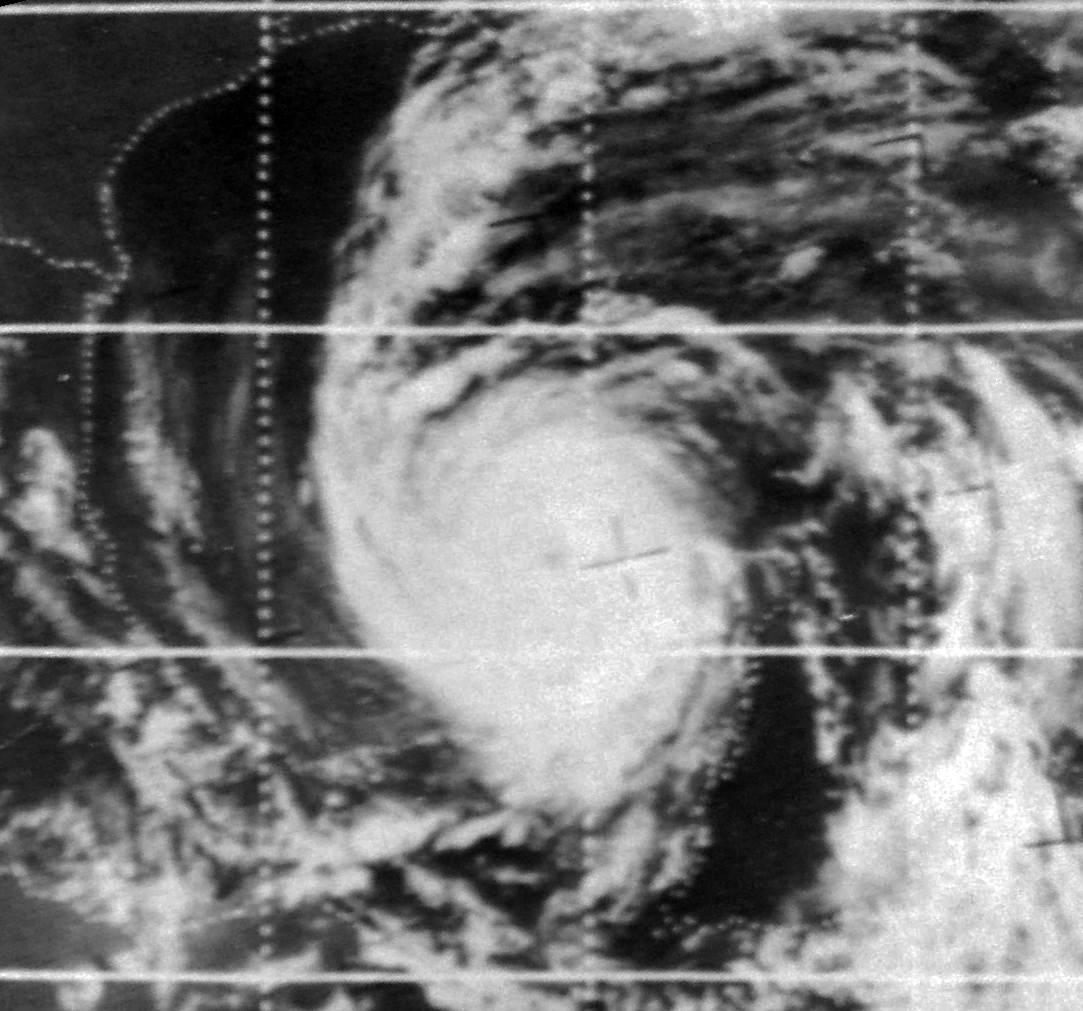
- Hurricane Inez seen from space near the Yucatán Peninsula on October 8, 1966

Meteorological history
- Formed: September 21, 1966
- Dissipated: October 11, 1966

Category 5 major hurricane
- 1-minute sustained (SSHWS/NWS)
- Highest winds: 160 mph (260 km/h)
- Lowest pressure: 927 mbar (hPa); 27.37 inHg

Overall effects
- Fatalities: 1,269
- Damage: $273 million (1966 USD)
- Areas affected: Lesser Antilles, Haiti, Cuba, Bahamas, Florida Keys, Yucatán, Mexico
- IBTrACS
- Part of the 1966 Atlantic hurricane season

Hurricane Inez was a powerful and very devastating Category 5 major hurricane (Note: A major hurricane is a tropical cyclone with maximum sustained winds of at least 111 mph (179 km/h), or a Category 3 or higher on the Saffir–Simpson hurricane scale.) that affected the Caribbean, Bahamas, Florida, and Mexico, killing over 1,000 people in 1966. It was the first storm on record to affect all of those areas. It originated from a tropical wave over Africa, and became a tropical depression by September 21. It moved slowly westward, initially failing to intensify much; it was upgraded to Tropical Storm Inez on September 24. The storm strengthened into a hurricane and was quickly intensifying when it struck the French overseas region of Guadeloupe on September 27. Inez severely damaged the island's banana and sugar crops, and thousands of homes were damaged, leaving 10,000 people homeless. Damage on Guadeloupe was estimated at $50 million, (Note: All damage totals are in 1966 United States dollars unless otherwise noted.) and there were 40 deaths. After entering the Caribbean, Inez briefly weakened before restrengthening, attaining peak sustained winds of 160 mph (260 km/h) on September 28, eventually making landfall at that intensity in the Dominican Republic. That day a hurricane hunters flight reported a gust of 197 mph (317 km/h), which was the highest recorded at the time.

Continuing westward, Inez made landfall as a small hurricane on the Barahona Peninsula of the Dominican Republic. There, the storm flooded many rivers and destroyed over 800 houses. Nationwide, there were about 100 deaths and $12 million in damage. After affecting the country, Inez struck southwestern Haiti, where it was considered the worst hurricane since the 1920s. As many as 1,000 people were killed, and 60,000 people were left homeless. Damage totaled $20.35 million in Haiti, prompting the United States government to send aid for the first time in nearly ten years due to previous mishandling of funds. Inez weakened quickly over Hispaniola, although it reintensified into a major hurricane before striking southeastern Cuba on September 30. In the country, 125,000 people were forced to evacuate, and there were three deaths and $20 million in damage.

The hurricane moved slowly over Cuba for two days before emerging into the Atlantic Ocean near the Bahamas. It was expected to continue out to sea, although it stalled and resumed its previous westward path. In the Bahamas, heavy rainfall and high tides caused flooding, which killed five people and left $15.5 million in damage. Hurricane-force winds occurred throughout the Florida Keys, where 160 homes and 190 trailers were damaged. Salt spray damaged crops in the region, and there was $5 million in damage and four deaths. In the Straits of Florida, Inez capsized a boat of Cuban refugees, killing 45 people. In the northern Gulf of Mexico, a helicopter crashed after carrying evacuees from an oil rig, killing 11 people. The hurricane threatened the northern Yucatán Peninsula, and although it remained offshore, Inez produced flooding and caused some power outages. At its final landfall, Inez flooded portions of Tamaulipas and cut off roads to Tampico. About 84,000 people were left homeless, and the hurricane destroyed at least 2,500 houses. Damage was estimated at $154 million, and there were 74 deaths in Mexico.

== Meteorological history ==
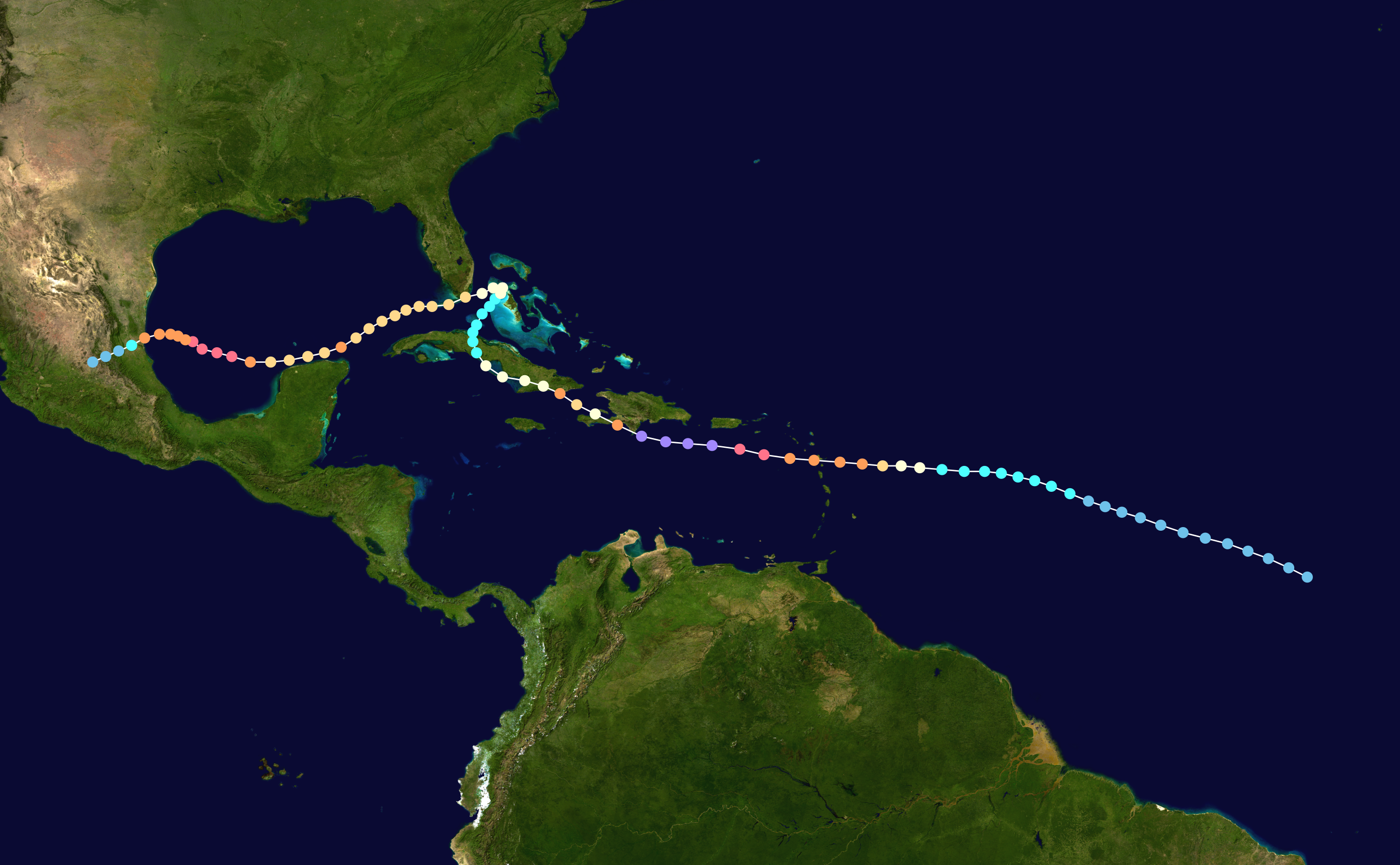
Map plotting the storm's track and intensity, according to the Saffir–Simpson scale Map key Saffir–Simpson scale Tropical depression (≤38 mph, ≤62 km/h) Tropical storm (39–73 mph, 63–118 km/h) Category 1 (74–95 mph, 119–153 km/h) Category 2 (96–110 mph, 154–177 km/h) Category 3 (111–129 mph, 178–208 km/h) Category 4 (130–156 mph, 209–251 km/h) Category 5 (≥157 mph, ≥252 km/h) Unknown Storm type Tropical cyclone Subtropical cyclone Extratropical cyclone, remnant low, tropical disturbance, or monsoon depression

The origins of Inez were from a tropical wave that formed over the Sahara in central Africa on September 15 from the monsoon. It moved westward in the prevailing winds, exiting the west coast of Africa on September 18. The precursor to Inez was a disturbance along the northern portion of the wave, which was considered a tropical depression by September 18 in the annual tropical cyclone summary. Tracked by satellites, the system moved to the west-southwest, and was officially classified a tropical depression on September 21 about halfway between the Lesser Antilles and Africa. The system remained weak as it turned toward the west-northwest. A Hurricane Hunters flight indicated some intensification in the system, prompting the National Hurricane Center (NHC) to initiate advisories on Tropical Storm Inez, located about 800 mi (1,300 km) east of Martinique. With warm water temperatures, the storm developed a circular area of convection over its center. Inez slowed while curving westward around a ridge to its north and quickly intensified, reaching hurricane status on September 26.

On September 27, Inez strengthened to reach winds of 120 mph (190 km/h), making it a Category 3 hurricane on the Saffir–Simpson scale. Later that day, it moved directly over the island of Guadeloupe. At the time, Inez was a small cyclone, with hurricane-force winds extending 50 mi (80 km) from the center; meteorologists labeled it as a "micro-hurricane... because of its characteristic small, tight cloud structure and strong maximum surface wind." Its structure became disrupted by the island, and the central pressure rose from 961 to 970 mbar (28.4 to 28.6 inHg), indicative of weakening. However, Inez re-intensified after entering the eastern Caribbean Sea, reaching a minimum pressure of 927 mbar (27.4 inHg) south of Puerto Rico on September 28. The Hurricane Hunters reported sustained winds of 197 mph (317 km/h) at a height of 8,000 ft (2,400 m), the strongest winds recorded for the storm. The same flight estimated surface winds between 150 and 175 mph (241 and 282 km/h) near the center. The peak intensity listed in the HURDAT, the Atlantic hurricane database, is 160 mph (260 km/h), making Inez a Category 5 hurricane. In 2017, a preliminary re-analysis conducted as part of the ongoing Atlantic hurricane reanalysis project raised Inez's peak intensity from its original 150 mph (240 km/h). This re-analysis has been officially accepted and included in HURDAT.

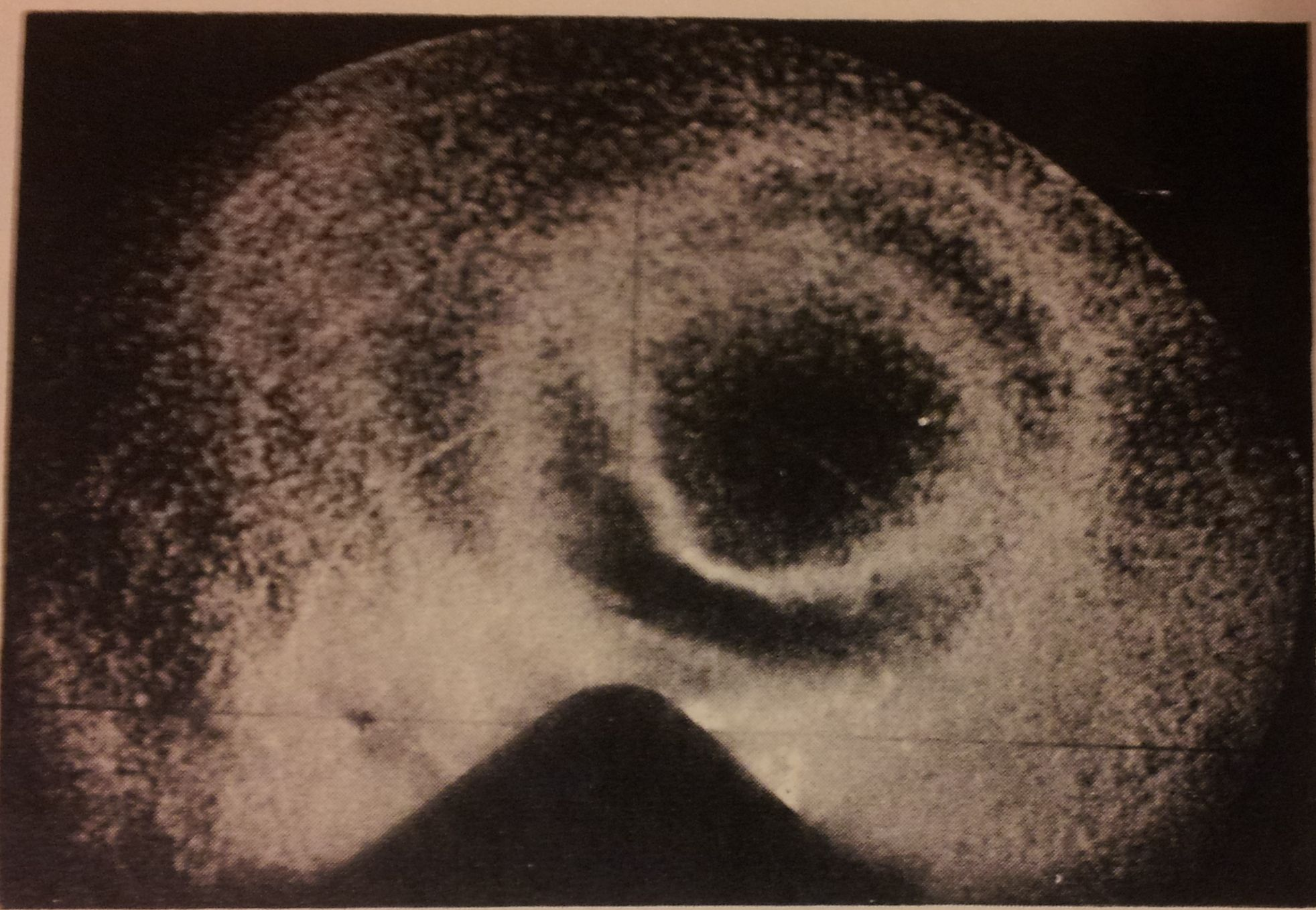
This weather radar image of Hurricane Inez was taken on September 29, 1966, at 0127 UTC

While near peak intensity, Inez was located about 160 mi (260 km) southwest of San Juan, Puerto Rico, and the eye was tracked by radar from the island. Its increasing outflow caused Tropical Storm Judith to the east over the central Atlantic to dissipate. On September 29, the small but powerful hurricane made landfall on the Barahona Peninsula, and quickly weakened over land. It briefly moved offshore and struck the southern peninsula of Haiti near Jacmel. The eye emerged into the Windward Passage near Léogâne, although severely weakened. The pressure rose to 987 mbar (29.1 inHg), and the winds decreased to 90 mph (140 km/h) over land. However, Inez quickly re-intensified over water, reaching winds of 115 mph (185 km/h) on September 30 before striking southeastern Cuba near Guantánamo Bay. When Inez was over Cuba, forecasters had difficulty in predicting the storm's future; it was expected that the hurricane would move to the north off the east coast of the United States due to a weakness in the ridge to the north. The hurricane drifted west-northwestward within light steering currents, weakening over the high terrain but later moving offshore the southern coast of Cuba. While over water, the eye reorganized, and the cyclone maintained hurricane intensity. Inez eventually turned to a northward drift over central Cuba and emerged into the Atlantic Ocean on October 2.

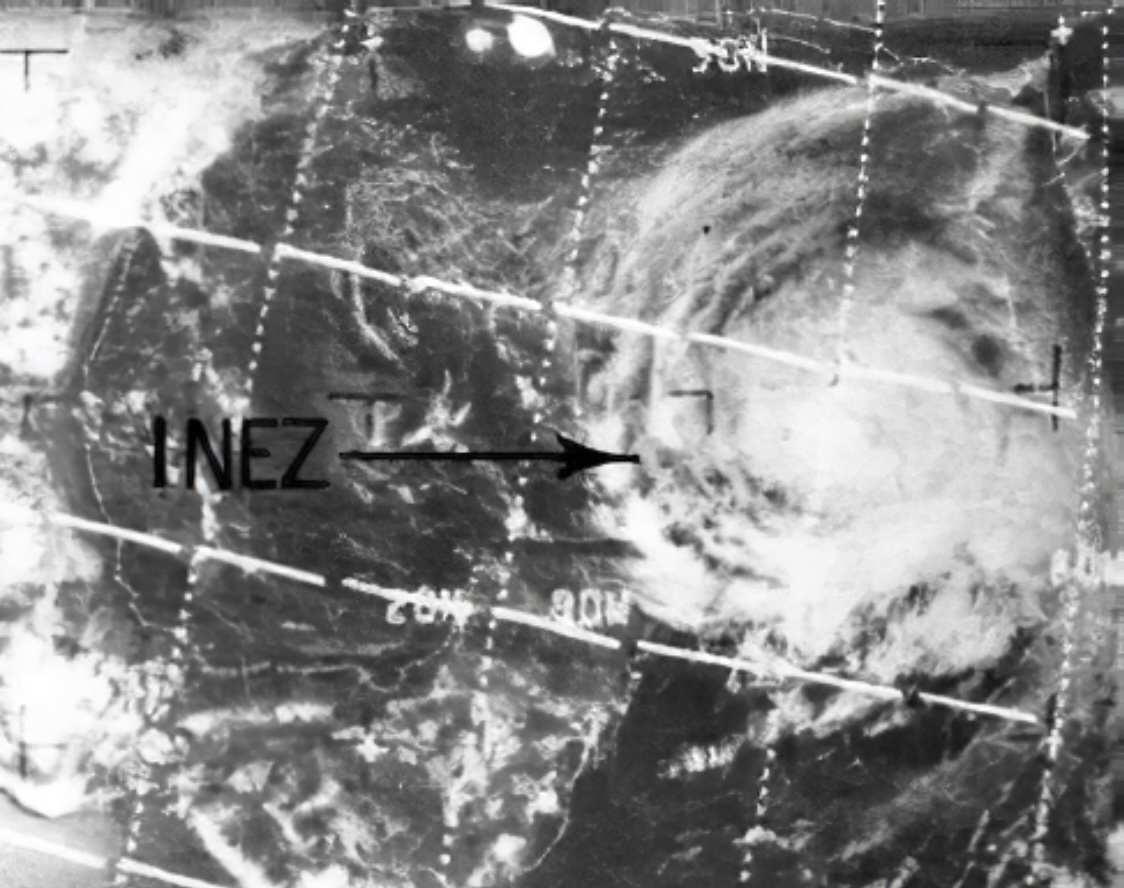
Hurricane Inez near Yucatán Peninsula

Shortly after exiting Cuba into the Atlantic, Inez weakened into a tropical storm, and was moving northeastward through the Bahamas about 24 hours later than forecast. At the time, the storm was expected to continue to the northeast around the Bermuda high. With little outflow and a large, diffuse circulation, Inez did not restrengthen much despite otherwise favorable conditions, potentially due to a nearby trough. The movement slowed, and the 1966 hurricane summary remarked that "Inez probably became nearly stationary closer to the United States mainland than any other storm." On October 3, Inez turned to the west-southwest as another ridge strengthened over the western Gulf of Mexico. Over the subsequent few days, the eye traversed the Florida Keys from Key Largo to Key West with winds of 100 mph (160 km/h) and continued through the Gulf of Mexico while slowly intensifying. On October 7, Inez brushed the northern coast of the Yucatán Peninsula with hurricane-force winds. By then, the ridge had begun to weaken, allowing the hurricane to turn more west-northwestward. On October 8, Inez attained a secondary peak intensity of 130 mph (210 km/h), with a pressure of 948 mbar (28.0 inHg). Briefly threatening the coastline of Texas, Inez turned to the southwest after the ridge again strengthened. On October 10, the hurricane made its final landfall near Tampico, Tamaulipas, in northeastern Mexico. It weakened rapidly over the region's high terrain, dissipating on October 11.

The unusual track of Inez marked the first time on record that a tropical cyclone affected the Lesser and Greater Antilles, Bahamas, Florida, and Mexico. The Associated Press described Inez as the "first to strike the Yucatán Peninsula in many years." It was also the first to move across the Gulf of Mexico without turning to the north so late in the season, and the 65 advisories issued by the NHC was the highest number at the time. The path taken by Inez was compared to Hurricane Betsy in 1965, which also slowed and moved erratically due to a strong ridge. Forecasters had difficulty with the hurricane because of its unusual path, as well as the inability to fly the Hurricane Hunters into Inez while it was over Cuba.

== Preparations ==
In Guadeloupe, which was the first area the hurricane affected, residents evacuated to schools set up as shelters. Pan American World Airways canceled flights to the region. When Inez was near peak intensity, the NHC warned residents in southern Haiti and the Dominican Republic of the danger posed by the hurricane. The agency emphasized that the eye was visible on radar to calm tension of an unexpected change in track. In general, hurricane warnings were issued 24 hours in advance, with the exception of southeastern Florida due to the hurricane's slowing track. Overall, 250,000 people evacuated along the path of Inez. At Guantánamo Bay, officials ordered residents at the naval base to evacuate to storm shelters. Large ships at the port there were moved to Jamaica before the storm struck. Throughout eastern Cuba, Premier Fidel Castro ordered about 125,000 people to evacuate in low-lying areas, mostly in Oriente Province. United States Air Force tracking stations in the Bahamas were secured or moved to safer locations. Residents in the Florida Keys boarded up windows and store fronts, and hundreds of people evacuated to a shelter in Key West. In southeastern Florida, government offices and schools closed.

Along the Yucatán peninsula, about 15,000 people were evacuated from the coastal city of Progreso, in a region that seldom experiences hurricanes. In the northern Gulf of Mexico, a helicopter crashed after evacuating workers from an oil platform about 65 mi (105 km) south-southwest of Morgan City, Louisiana, in otherwise calm conditions; 11 people died, including the pilot. When Inez was approaching its final landfall, the United States Weather Bureau issued hurricane warnings from Brownsville to Port Isabel, Texas, with gale warnings northward to Corpus Christi. At least 2,000 people evacuated from Port Isabel alone, and many shrimp boats were secured. In the Tampico area where Inez made its final landfall, over 31,000 people evacuated to higher grounds.

== Impact ==
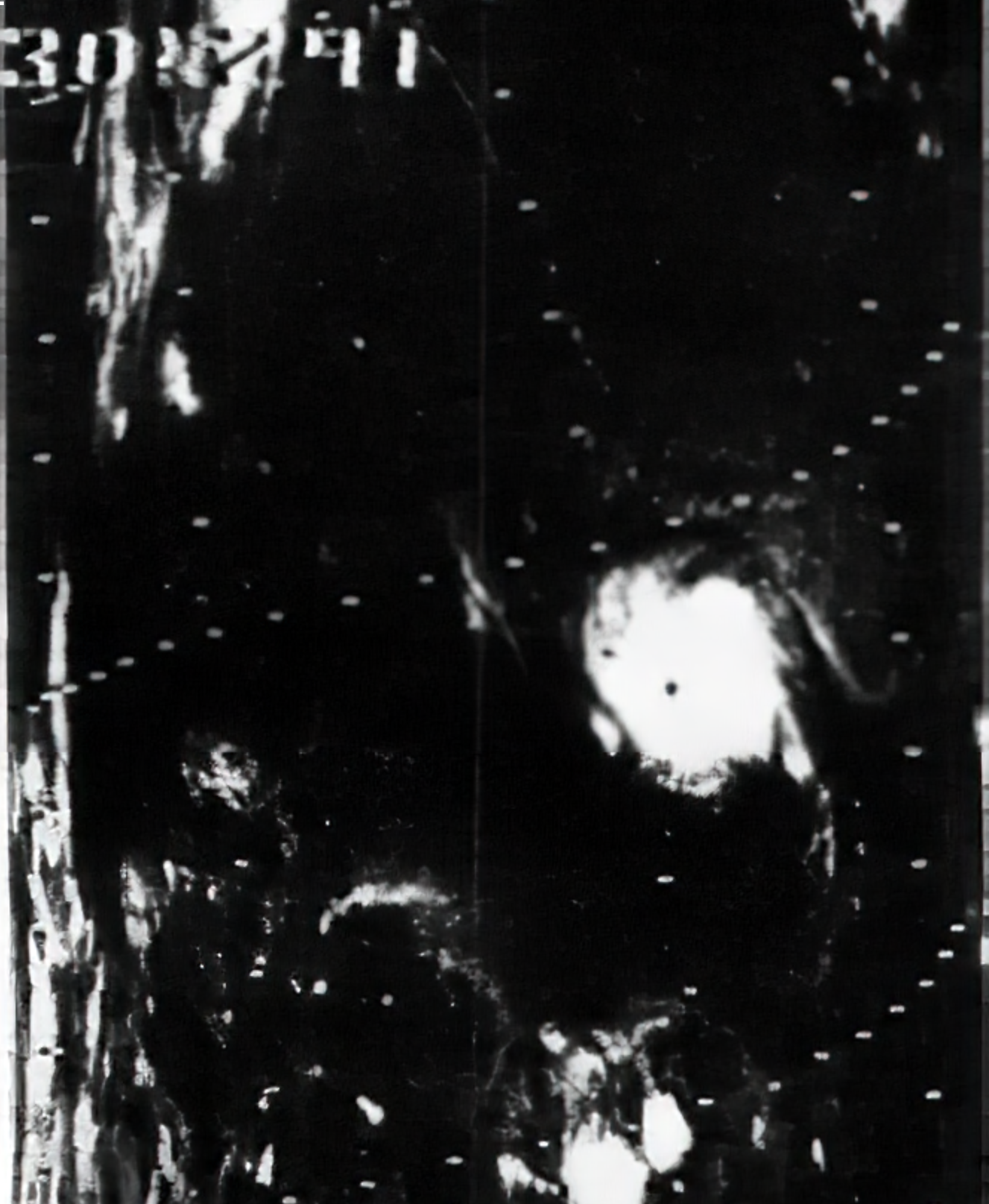
Satellite image of Inez near peak intensity in the Caribbean

Overall, Hurricane Inez killed about 1,000 people, mostly on Hispaniola, and caused over $200 million in damage. Crop damage was less than other storms of similar magnitude, due to Inez's small size and its occurrence late in the season.

=== Caribbean and Bahamas ===
When Inez struck Guadeloupe, a station on the island reported sustained winds of 80 mph (130 km/h), with gusts to 94 mph (151 km/h), before communications failed. Rain on the island reached 6.5 in (170 mm). The high winds destroyed the roofs of thousands of houses, leaving 10,000 people homeless. There was heavy damage to both the banana and sugar crops, described as "flattened" by the St. Petersburg Times. The storm flooded a power plant in Pointe-à-Pitre and downed many power lines, causing power outages. The Associated Press described the hurricane as having "virtually leveled a whole district of Pointe-à-Pitre". Hundreds of people were injured, although because of damaged hospitals and the power outage, most only received makeshift treatment. Inez left 40 people dead and $50 million in damage on the island. Strong winds also affected nearby Antigua, and damage was reported from that island to Dominica.

In the United States Virgin Islands, a station on St. Croix reported 45 mph (72 km/h) gusts. When Inez passed south of Puerto Rico, its rainbands produced gusty winds along the island's southern coast, reaching 50 mph (80 km/h) in Peñuelas. On Isla de Mona, wind gusts were estimated at 80 mph (130 km/h). Flooding occurred in southern Puerto Rico, and high winds damaged 20 houses.

Hurricane Inez struck the Dominican Republic near peak intensity. Along the Barahona Peninsula, more than 800 homes were destroyed, and nationwide about 5,000 people were left homeless. There was heavy damage to the country's cotton industry, as well as the coffee, sugar cane, and cocoa crops along the Barahona Peninsula. In the capital city of Santo Domingo, heavy rains flooded hundreds of homes along the Ozama River, forcing thousands to evacuate. High seas there damaged a portion of a seawall. Many rivers along the Barahona Peninsula were also flooded. Throughout the country, Inez killed about 100 people, including 55 in Juancho, and left $12 million in damage.

In neighboring Haiti, high winds downed power lines and radio towers, which cut outside communication. High rainfall led to flash flooding between mountain ranges, in a location nicknamed the "valley of death"; there, the Weather Bureau remarked that "local winds... may well have exceeded 160 mph (260 km/h)". Thousands of homes were either destroyed or lost their roof. The Haitian government reported over 1,000 deaths in the weeks after the storm. The United States government reported that the hurricane "killed no more than 50" in Haiti, and "nor was there a real emergency," due to president François Duvalier misusing previous aid. The U.S. assessment was incorrect, as the 1966 annual tropical cyclone summary in the Monthly Weather Review indicated 750 deaths in Haiti, mostly in Jacmel. President Duvalier considered the hurricane the "worst storm... since the 1920s." In the country, 1,000 people were injured and 60,000 were left homeless, and damage was estimated at $20.35 million. Throughout Hispaniola, about 1,500 people were seriously injured, and many people were still recovering from Hurricane Flora in 1963.

A station at Guantánamo Bay reported winds of 138 mph (222 km/h) when Inez moved ashore in Cuba, and rainfall reached 12 in (300 mm). Tides were 10 ft (3.0 m) above normal there. The hurricane knocked down trees and power lines, and many roofs were damaged on the naval base. In the city of Guantánamo, the hurricane destroyed 500 houses. High winds heavily damaged the country's sugar and coffee crops. When Inez re-entered the Gulf of Mexico, it threatened northwestern Cuba and produced 12 in (300 mm) of rainfall. High waves and strong winds affected the coastline. In La Habana Province, flooding forced 21,000 people to evacuate, mostly in low-lying areas. One building was destroyed in Havana. Nationwide, Inez injured at least 38 people, and caused five deaths, three of which occurred after Inez moved southwestward from the Florida Keys. Damage totaled $20 million.

In the Bahamas, the hurricane dropped heavy rainfall over three days, reaching 14.31 in (363 mm) in Nassau. There, Inez spawned a small tornado that produced winds of over 100 mph (160 km/h), killing one person and injuring three. High tides flooded portions of Nassau. Two waterspouts were reported in Freeport. Wind gusts in the archipelago reached 90 mph (140 km/h) at West End, Grand Bahama, and sustained winds reached 64 mph (103 km/h) in Freeport. Five people died throughout the country, and damage was estimated at $15.5 million.

=== United States ===
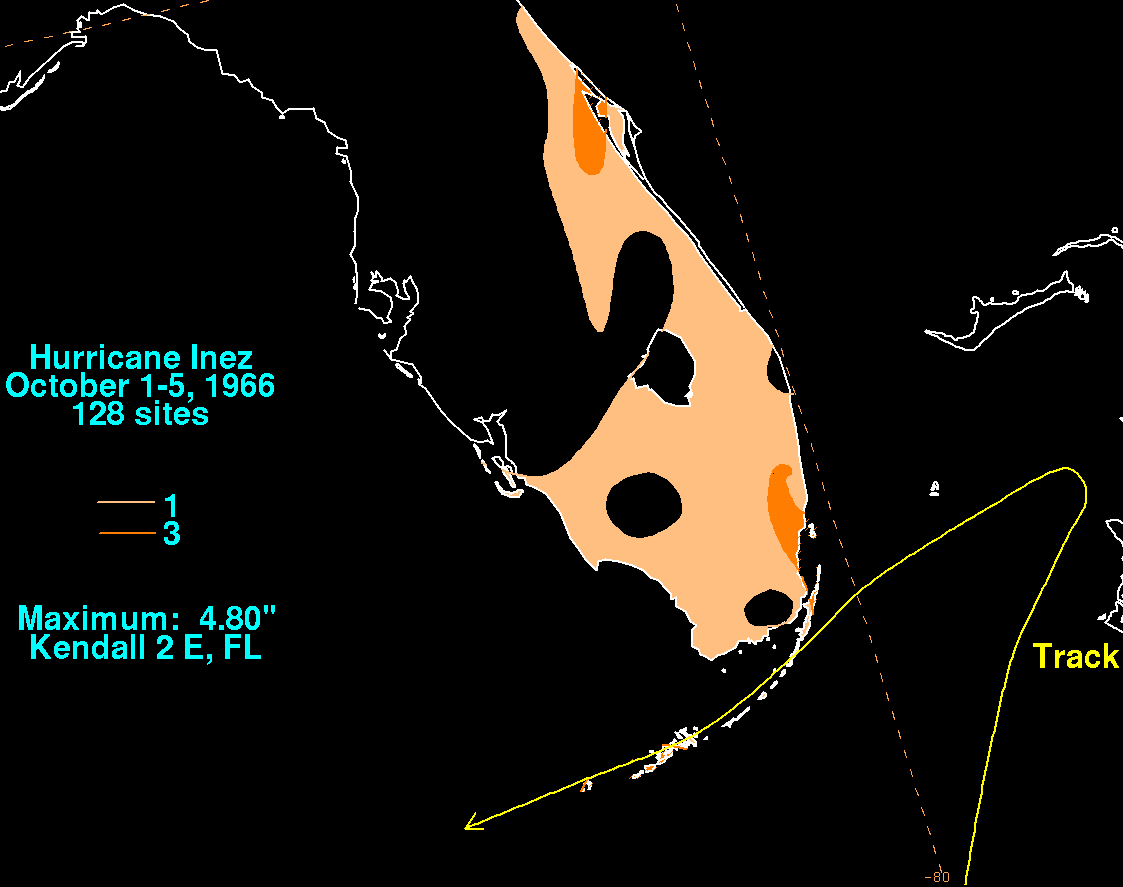
Rainfall Summary for Hurricane Inez in Florida

In the Straits of Florida, high waves from Inez overturned a 24 ft (7.3 m) blockade runner carrying Cuban exiles to Miami. Ten of the passengers escaped on a damaged raft, but the only survivor was the captain; 45 people died due to the boat capsizing. High waves also disabled three ships and beached a Coast Guard boat near Miami; a lifeguard and people on the beach assisted in rescuing the crew of nine Coast Guardsmen amid rough seas. When the hurricane moved across the Florida Keys, it dropped light rainfall, reaching 4.80 in (122 mm) near Kendall. Inez was considered a "dry hurricane", and about 1 in (25 mm) of the precipitation that fell was largely in the form of sea water spray. Light rainfall occurred in Miami, where strong winds damaged crops due to salt spray onto local vegetation.

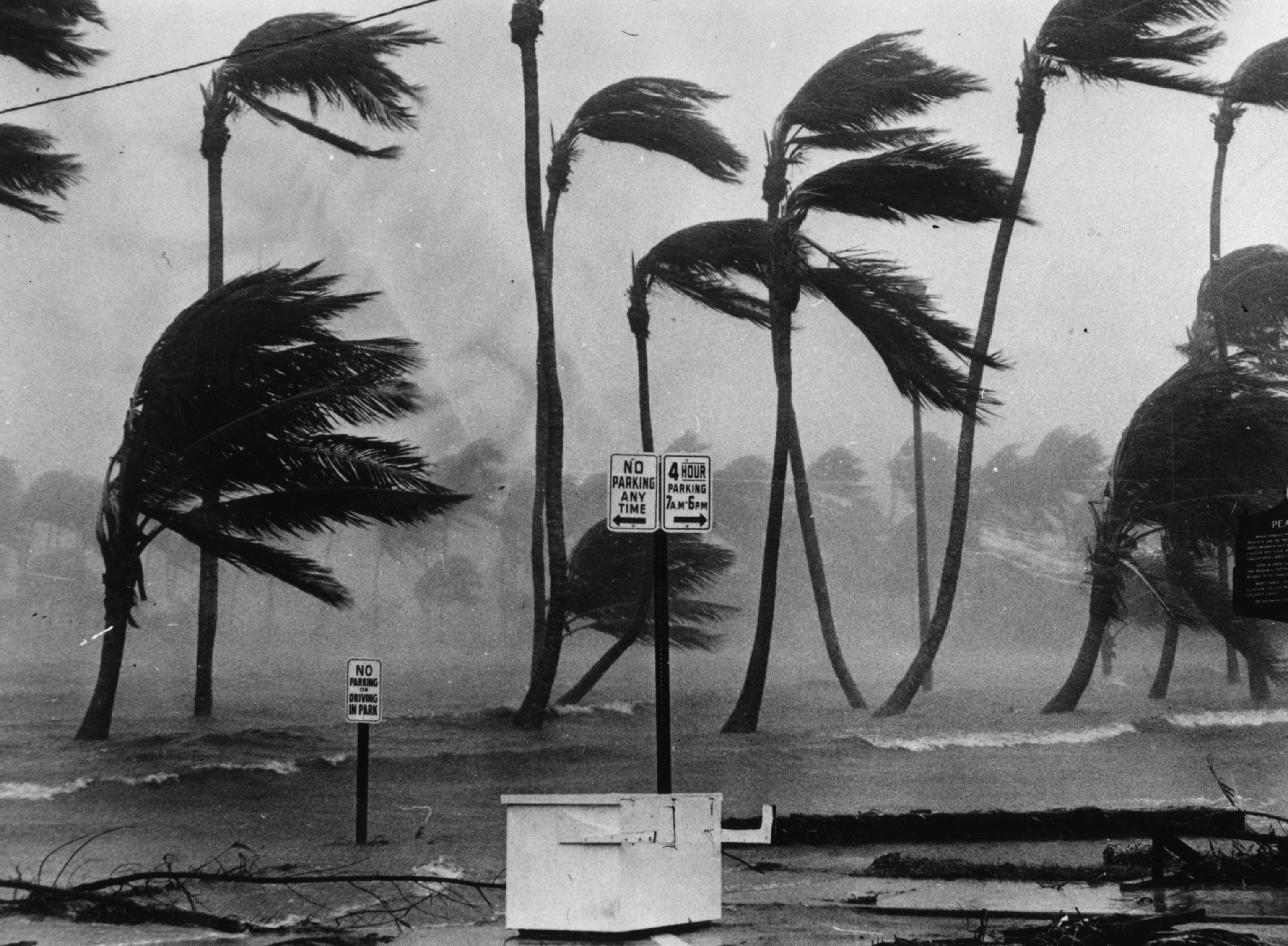
Flooding and Strong Winds in Miami during Hurricane Inez in October 3

During its passage, Inez produced above normal tides, reaching 5 ft (1.5 m) above normal on Big Pine Key. Inez produced strong winds while it was intensifying, and the strongest winds occurred after the passage of the eye. The highest sustained winds were 98 mph (158 km/h) on Plantation Key, and peak gusts were 120 mph (190 km/h) in the Dry Tortugas. On Big Pine Key, sustained winds were estimated at 150 mph (240 km/h), with gusts to 165 mph (266 km/h). On the Florida mainland, the highest gusts were 92 mph (148 km/h) at Flamingo.

The winds damaged smaller tree limbs and uprooted some trees. About 20% of the local avocado crop was blown off trees, although most was salvageable. Winds and salt spray severely damaged vegetables in southern Dade County, including up to 80% losses of tomatoes in some farms. Power outages were reported in Key West. In the Florida Keys, the hurricane damaged 160 homes and 190 trailers.

Statewide, damage totaled $5 million, and there were four deaths; three were elderly people who died of heart attacks while installing shutters, and the fourth was a teenager who was swept by large surf. Inez was the last hurricane to threaten the Miami metropolitan area until Hurricane David in 1979, and the last hurricane to strike the Florida Keys until Hurricane Kate in 1985.

When Inez was making its final landfall in Mexico, its outer circulation reached southern Texas, producing winds of 22 mph (35 km/h) and trace rainfall. Tides reached 3.1 ft (0.94 m) above normal in Corpus Christi, and 10 ft (3.0 m) waves caused $5,000 in damage to piers.

=== Mexico ===
While the hurricane was off the north coast of the Yucatán peninsula, Inez produced sustained winds of 69 mph (111 km/h), with gusts to 81 mph (130 km/h), in Mérida. The winds cut power and knocked down trees in Progreso, as well as nearby cities. High waves destroyed a dock in Telchac Puerto. Heavy rainfall flooded streets in Mérida, although damage was not severe. Agriculture damage along the Yucatán reached US$50 million.

At the hurricane's final landfall, a station in Tampico reported sustained winds of 115 mph (185 km/h), with gusts to 127 mph (204 km/h) before communications were cut. Inez dropped heavy rainfall upon moving ashore, causing flooding. In Soto la Marina, Tamaulipas, rainfall totaled 10.12 in (257 mm). In northeastern Mexico, more than 3,000 people were stranded by flooding after dozens of rivers and streams rose above their banks, forcing some families to hold onto trees. The floods washed out roads around Tampico and cut communications and the water supply. In Tamaulipas, 15 people died while trying to deliver supplies to residents along the Tamesi River. Throughout the country, the hurricane left about 84,000 people homeless, and destroyed at least 2,500 houses. Agricultural damage totaled over $80 million, and property damage was estimated at $24 million in Tampico and Ciudad Madero alone. Overall, Inez killed 74 people in Mexico.

== Aftermath ==
In the days after the storm struck Guadeloupe, there was a food shortage. Officials quickly cleared roads and worked to restore the damaged banana crop. Charles de Gaulle visited the island, and the French population unified to provide assistance to the island. In late October 1966, the French government set up a relief fund for Guadeloupe totaling $34 million (₣170 million francs). The government initiated plans to rebuild the island to withstand the winds of strong hurricanes. The United States Agency for International Development flew 20,000 pounds of blankets and clothing to the island. Due to the heavy damage in Hispaniola, VMM-365, a United States Marine Corps helicopter division, spent 454 hours and flew 740 sorties to provide 186,676 tons of relief supplies to Haiti and the Dominican Republic. The division also helped evacuate 142 hospital patients. The Dominican Air Force also assisted in transporting injured people from outlying areas to Santo Domingo. The country deployed 5,000 troops to send food, medicine, and clothing to the storm-damaged areas in the interior, as well as Barahona Peninsula. The Holy See sent $2,000 to assist the residents affected by the storm in Haiti. After a nearly ten year boycott due to the actions of Haitian president François Duvalier, the United States provided a $1.3 million loan to the country to help rebuild infrastructure and provide education. Industrialist Clint Murchison gave $50,000 in flour and food from a mill he owned in the country. The United States also sent vaccines and 4,360 pounds of food.

In Cuba, sailors on the USS America (CV-66) spent about 1,700 hours to assist Guantánamo Bay in recovery. The sole survivor of the sinking boat carrying Cuban exiles was tried in a military tribunal. The man was held responsible for the 44 boat deaths and was quickly executed by the Cuban government. The United States Coast Guard deployed boats, helicopters, and airplanes to find victims of the boat capsized in the Straits of Florida. In the United States, the price for lettuce and tomatoes rose due to Inez's crop damage in Florida and reduced crop output in California. The country's military sent helicopters and planes to join the Mexican Air Force, as well as trucks by land, to deliver tons of supplies, including food, clothing, and medicine to flood-affected areas in Tamaulipas. In the weeks after the storm, many residents had minimal food access, and some areas remained flooded. Conditions in Tampico, located near where the storm moved ashore, gradually returned to normal. Heavy rainfall in Mexico restored reservoirs, which assisted future crop growing.

As a result of the storm's disastrous effects, the name Inez was retired, and it will never again be used for another Atlantic hurricane. It was replaced with Isabel for the 1970 season.

== See also ==
- List of Florida hurricanes (1950–1974)
- List of Category 5 Atlantic hurricanes
- 1900 Galveston hurricane
- Hurricane David (1979) – most recent Category 5 hurricane to strike the Dominican Republic since Inez
- Hurricane Georges (1998)
