= Pescadería =

- Location within the Dominican Republic
- Coordinates: 18°16′12″N 71°10′12″W
- Country: Dominican Republic
- Province: Barahona

Population (2008)
  - Total: 2,211

Pescadería is a town in the Barahona province of the Dominican Republic.
