= List of storms named Ella =

The names Ella and Ela have been used for 11 tropical cyclones worldwide. Five were in the Atlantic Ocean, two were in the South Pacific Ocean, and one each occurred in the Central Pacific Ocean, West Pacific Ocean, South-West Indian Ocean, and Australian region.

In the Atlantic:

- Hurricane Ella (1958) – deadly hurricane in Haiti and Cuba with over 35 deaths; tracked from the Lesser Antilles to southern Texas where it dissipated
- Hurricane Ella (1962) – strongest hurricane of the season; formed near Bahamas and tracked through the western Atlantic Ocean
- Tropical Storm Ella (1966) – tracked from tropical Atlantic before dissipating north of the Lesser Antilles
- Hurricane Ella (1970) – struck northeastern Mexico as a major hurricane
- Hurricane Ella (1978) – strongest hurricane of the season in terms of sustained winds; reached Category 4 status east of Maryland and south of Nova Scotia before brushing Newfoundland

In the Central Pacific:

- Tropical Storm Ela (2015) – weak tropical storm that formed at sea

In the West Pacific:

- Tropical Storm Ella (1997) (23W, Japan Meteorological Agency analyzed it as a tropical depression, not as a tropical storm.) – short-lived tropical storm that dissipated near the Northern Marianas Islands

In the South-West Indian:

- Tropical Storm Ella (1976) – short-lived storm that persisted to the northwest of Madagascar

In the Australian region:

- Tropical Storm Ella (1968) – short-lived weak tropical storm

In the South Pacific:

- Tropical Storm Ella (1999) – tropical storm that passed through the Loyalty Islands, causing some damage on Lifou Island but no reported casualties
- Cyclone Ella (2017) – tropical cyclone that tracked near the Samoan Islands, Tonga and Wallis and Futuna

== See also ==
Storms with similar names

- Hurricane Ele (2002) – a Category 3 Pacific hurricane that crossed into the West Pacific Ocean
- Cyclone Enala (2023) – a South-West Indian Ocean tropical cyclone
- Hurricane Eta (2020) – a Category 4 Atlantic hurricane that caused over 100 fatalities across Central America, Mexico, and the United States
- Cyclone Eva (2022) – a Category 1 South Pacific tropical cyclone
