= Paraíso, Barahona =

Paraíso
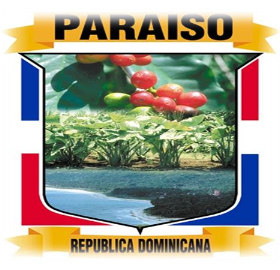
- Coat of arms

- Location within the Dominican Republic
- Coordinates: 18°00′N 71°10′W
- Country: Dominican Republic
- Province: Barahona Province

Area
  - Total: 138.63 km^{2} (53.53 sq mi)

Population (2010)
  - Total: 11,235
  - Density: 81.043/km^{2} (209.90/sq mi)

Paraíso is a town in Barahona Province, in the southwest of the Dominican Republic.

It is a small city surrounded by green mountains and rivers that end up at the Caribbean Sea. San Rafael and Los Patos are the two municipalities that are on both corners of the town. Both towns have beaches and fresh river water that comes from the top of nearby mountains. The weather is tropical with an average temperature of 85°F. Paraíso is the Spanish and Portuguese word for Paradise.
