= La Ciénaga, Barahona =

La Ciénaga
- Location within the Dominican Republic
- Coordinates: 18°4′12″N 71°6′0″W
- Country: Dominican Republic
- Province: Barahona
- Municipality: 2005

Area
  - Total: 112.30 km^{2} (43.36 sq mi)

Population (2012)
  - Total: 8,004
  - Density: 71.27/km^{2} (184.6/sq mi)

La Ciénaga is a town in the Barahona province of the Dominican Republic.The town was founded in the 17th century as an important port for sugar and tobacco.

== Sources ==
- – World-Gazetteer.com
