= El Peñón, Santander =

Coordinates: 5.89222°N 73.7403°W

- Municipality and town
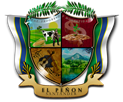
- Flag Coat of arms

- Location of the municipality and town of El Peñón, Santander in the Santander Department of Colombia.
- Country: Colombia
- Department: Santander Department
- Time zone: UTC-5 (Colombia Standard Time)

El Peñón is a town and municipality in the Santander Department in northeastern Colombia.
