= El Peñón, Dominican Republic =

El Peñón
- Location within the Dominican Republic
- Coordinates: 18°18′00″N 71°11′24″W
- Country: Dominican Republic
- Province: Barahona

Area
  - Total: 204.12 km^{2} (78.81 sq mi)

Population (2012)
  - Total: 3,589
  - Density: 17.58/km^{2} (45.54/sq mi)

El Peñón is a town in the Barahona province of the Dominican Republic.

== Sources ==
- World Gazeteer: Dominican Republic – World-Gazetteer.com
