= Barahona Province =

Province of the Dominican Republic

Barahona
- Province
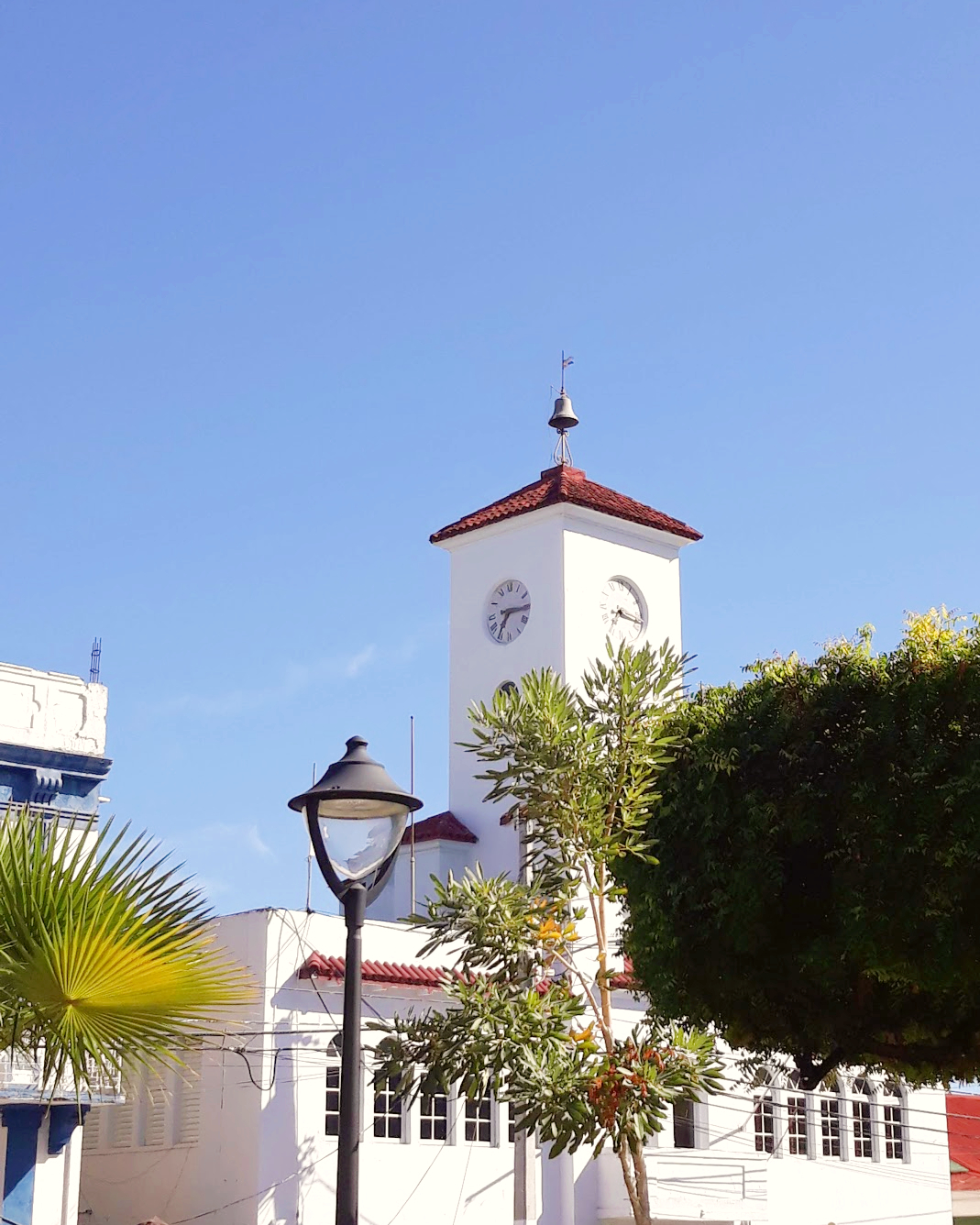
- Barahona Dominican Republic town municipal building

- Location of the Barahona Province
- Coordinates: 18°12′0″N 71°06′0″W
- Country: Dominican Republic
- Province since: 1881
- Capital: Santa Cruz de Barahona

Area
  - Total: 1,739.38 km^{2} (671.58 sq mi)

Population (2022)
  - Total: 200,884
  - Density: 115.492/km^{2} (299.122/sq mi)
- Time zone: UTC-4 (EST)
- Postal code: 81000
- Area code: 1-809 1-829 1-849
- ISO 3166 code: DO-04

Barahona (Spanish pronunciation: [baɾaˈona]) is a province of the Dominican Republic. It is spread over an area of 1,768.71 km^{2} (682.90 sq mi), and has its capital at Santa Cruz de Barahona. It was established in 1907. As per the 2022 census, it had a population of 200,884 inhabitants.

== History ==
Barahona was founded in 1802 by the Haitian general Toussaint Louverture. It was earlier part of the Azua Province earlier, and Barahona was created as a new district on 12 September 1881, and was elevated as a province in 1907. The Baoruco Province was divided in 1943 and Pedernales Province was carved from it in 1957.

== Geography ==
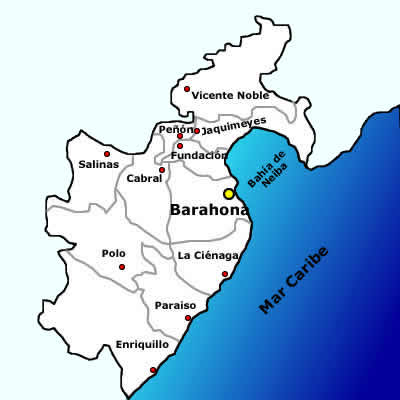
Municipalities of the Province

Barahona is one of the 31 provinces of the Dominican Republic. It is spread over an area of 1,284.9 km^{2} (496.1 sq mi). It forms part of the Enriquillo region in the south western part of the country. Barahona borders the provinces of Pedernales to the southwest, Baoruco and Independencia to the north, and Azua to the east along with coastline to the south with the Caribbean Sea.

The province is roughly divided into two geographical regions, the mountainous region in the south, which extends to the coast, and the plains to the north. The Baoruco Mountain Range traverses the province extensively, and it is called Bahoruco Oriental (East Bahoruco) in the region. The Neiba Mountains is located along the eastern border, Martin Garcia mountains forms the boundary with the Azua Province in the northeast. The highest peak is Pie de Palo (at 1,603 m (5,259 ft). The Yaque del Sur river valley forms the plains, and is extensively watered by the river, smaller streams such as Nizaíto, Bahoruco, and San Rafael and the Rincón Lake. The province has several white sand beaches with cliffs lining the coast. The province has significant deposits of bauxite, gypsum, and rock salt.

=== Climate and vegeation ===
The province has a tropical savanna climate (Köppen climate classification: Aw). It has an average annual temperature is 26.59 °C (79.86 °F), and receives an average annual rainfall of 4.25 cm (1.67 in) annually. The climate is hot and dry in the plains, while it is cooler in the mountains.

About 38.2% land area is covered by forests in the province. The vegetation mainly consists of dry forests in the plains, and conifer and tropical forests in the Bahoruco mountain region. Agricultural and pastoral lands occupy 29.8% of the land area.

=== Administration ===
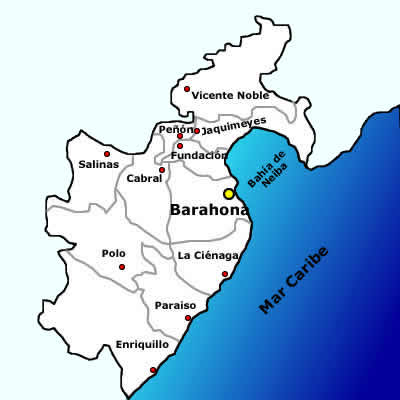
Municipalities of Barahona Province

Its capital city is Santa Cruz de Barahona. The province is divided into 11 municipalities (municipios) and ten municipal districts (distrito municipal - D.M.) within them.

- Cabral
- El Peñón
- Enriquillo
  - Arroyo Dulce (D.M.)
- Fundación
  - Pescadería (D.M.)
- Jaquimeyes
  - Palo Alto (D.M.)
- La Ciénaga
  - Bahoruco (D.M.)
- Las Salinas
- Paraíso
  - Los Patos (D.M.)
- Polo
- Santa Cruz de Barahona
  - El Cachón (D.M.)
  - La Guázara (D.M.)
- Vicente Noble
  - Canoa (D.M.)
  - Fondo Negro (D.M.)
  - Quita Coraza (D.M.)

== Demographics ==
According to the 2022 census, the province had a population of 200,884 inhabitants. The population consisted of 101,336 males (50.4%) and 99,548 females (49.6%). About 29.3% of the population was below the age of 15 years, 62.1% belonged to the working-age group of 15–64 years, and 8.6% was aged 65 years or older. The province had an urban population of 168,569 (83.9%) and 32,315 (16.1%) inhabitants resided in the rural areas.

== Economy ==
The economy is mainly based on agriculture. Major agricultural produce include coffee in the hilly regions, and banana and sugarcane in the plains. Fishing is prevalent along the Caribbean Sea coast.
