= Polo, Dominican Republic =

Polo
- Location within the Dominican Republic
- Coordinates: 18°04′48″N 71°16′48″W
- Country: Dominican Republic
- Province: Barahona

Area
  - Total: 200.61 km^{2} (77.46 sq mi)
- Elevation: 746 m (2,448 ft)

Population (2012)
  - Total: 7,144
  - Density: 35.61/km^{2} (92.23/sq mi)

Polo is a municipality of the Barahona Province in southwestern Dominican Republic, known for its green and high mountains and for growing fine coffee. Polo is located in the Sierra de Bahoruco mountain range at an elevation of approximately 740 metres above sea level, in a small valley surrounded by peaks reaching up to 1,680 metres. The municipality was settled in the 1890s and covers an area of 200.61 km².

Its coffee is grown between 600 and 1,100 metres elevation and forms part of the broader Barahona coffee region, known internationally as "Café de Barahona" with a Denominación de Origen (protected designation of origin). Polo is one of four municipalities in the Barahona Province where coffee is cultivated, alongside Paraíso, Enriquillo and Barahona, with approximately 12,000 hectares under cultivation across the region and 2,600 growers. The municipality borders Cabral to the north, the city of Barahona to the northeast, La Ciénaga to the east, Paraíso to the southeast, Enriquillo to the south, and Las Salinas to the northwest. The small town of Polo is also known for having El Polo Magnético (the magnetic pole), an area on a mountain near the village. If a car is stopped at the right place, and put in neutral, the car seems to be rolling up the hill. Rather than being caused by a magnetic field in the surrounding landscape, this phenomenon is produced by the gravity hill optical illusion.

== Climate ==
Climate data for Polo (1961–1990)
Month	Jan	Feb	Mar	Apr	May	Jun	Jul	Aug	Sep	Oct	Nov	Dec	Year
Record high °C (°F)	33.8 (92.8)	33.2 (91.8)	32.4 (90.3)	32.0 (89.6)	31.0 (87.8)	31.2 (88.2)	32.2 (90.0)	32.4 (90.3)	34.9 (94.8)	35.2 (95.4)	34.2 (93.6)	33.6 (92.5)	35.2 (95.4)
Mean daily maximum °C (°F)	25.8 (78.4)	26.1 (79.0)	26.5 (79.7)	27.1 (80.8)	27.0 (80.6)	26.9 (80.4)	27.4 (81.3)	27.8 (82.0)	28.1 (82.6)	27.6 (81.7)	27.3 (81.1)	26.3 (79.3)	27.0 (80.6)
Daily mean °C (°F)	23.2 (73.8)	23.1 (73.6)	23.6 (74.5)	24.6 (76.3)	25.6 (78.1)	26.3 (79.3)	26.9 (80.4)	26.8 (80.2)	26.7 (80.1)	26.2 (79.2)	24.9 (76.8)	23.6 (74.5)	25.1 (77.2)
Mean daily minimum °C (°F)	13.5 (56.3)	13.7 (56.7)	14.4 (57.9)	15.4 (59.7)	16.6 (61.9)	17.3 (63.1)	17.3 (63.1)	17.1 (62.8)	16.9 (62.4)	16.5 (61.7)	15.5 (59.9)	13.9 (57.0)	15.7 (60.3)
Record low °C (°F)	0.5 (32.9)	8.0 (46.4)	8.5 (47.3)	8.5 (47.3)	11.2 (52.2)	12.0 (53.6)	10.0 (50.0)	11.0 (51.8)	11.9 (53.4)	11.2 (52.2)	10.0 (50.0)	8.0 (46.4)	0.5 (32.9)
Average rainfall mm (inches)	64.7 (2.55)	63.2 (2.49)	68.1 (2.68)	73.9 (2.91)	195.0 (7.68)	264.8 (10.43)	180.4 (7.10)	260.2 (10.24)	265.6 (10.46)	233.1 (9.18)	132.5 (5.22)	73.1 (2.88)	1,874.6 (73.80)
Average rainy days (≥ 1.0 mm)	8.6	7.5	8.5	9.4	15.0	16.2	12.6	13.2	12.1	13.3	9.3	7.7	133.4
Average relative humidity (%)	88.7	86.3	85.9	85.8	87.7	87.4	86.2	82.9	86.8	87.8	87.1	87.4	86.7
Source 1: NOAA
Source 2: ONAMET, Acqweather
