= 1994 hurricane season =

1994 hurricane season may refer to:

- The 1994 Atlantic hurricane season
- The 1994 Pacific hurricane season
