= Hurricane Gordon =

Category 1 Atlantic hurricane in 1994

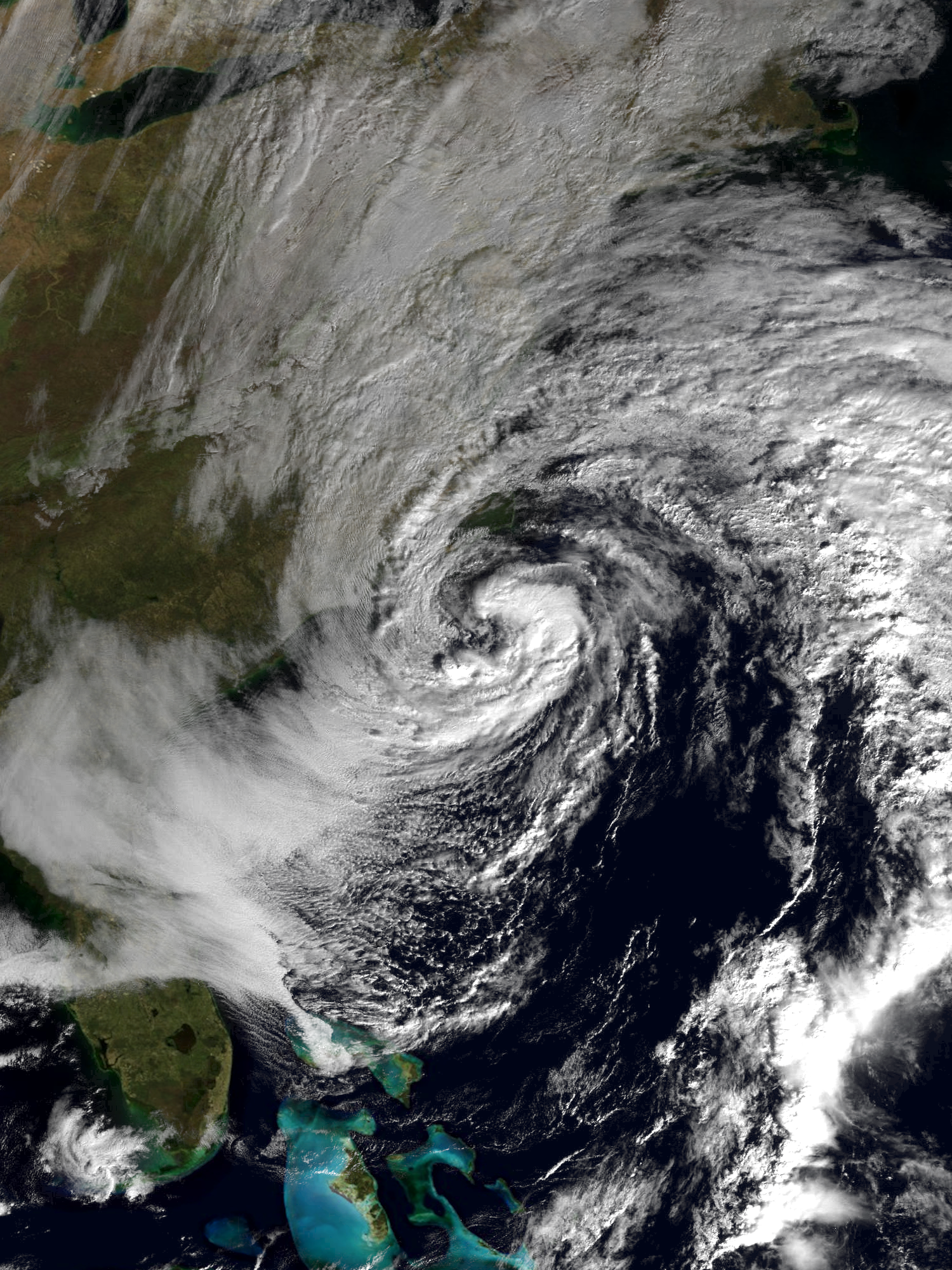
- Gordon near peak intensity off the coast of North Carolina on November 18

Meteorological history
- Formed: November 8, 1994
- Dissipated: November 21, 1994

Category 1 hurricane
- 1-minute sustained (SSHWS/NWS)
- Highest winds: 85 mph (140 km/h)
- Lowest pressure: 980 mbar (hPa); 28.94 inHg

Overall effects
- Fatalities: 1,152
- Damage: $594 million (1994 USD)
- Areas affected: Central America, Cayman Islands, Jamaica, Hispaniola, Cuba, Lucayan Archipelago, Florida, Georgia, Mid-Atlantic states
- IBTrACS
- Part of the 1994 Atlantic hurricane season

Hurricane Gordon was an erratic, long-lived, and catastrophic late-season hurricane in 1994. The twelfth and final tropical cyclone of the 1994 Atlantic hurricane season, Gordon formed as a tropical depression in the southwestern Caribbean on November 8. Without strengthening, the depression made landfall on Nicaragua. Later on November 10, the system began to strengthen as it tracked further from land, and it quickly strengthened into Tropical Storm Gordon, the seventh named storm that season. Gordon also made landfalls in Jamaica and Cuba while a minimal tropical storm. It entered the southwestern Atlantic while resembling a subtropical cyclone. By the time it entered the Gulf of Mexico, the storm was fully tropical again. Tropical Storm Gordon later crossed the Florida Keys, and turning to the northeast it made landfall in Fort Myers, Florida. Gordon strengthened after it re-entered the Atlantic Ocean, becoming a hurricane on November 17. It briefly threatened North Carolina while turning to the northwest, although it turned to the south and weakened. Gordon deteriorated into a tropical depression and struck Florida again at that intensity on November 20. It turned to the north and dissipated the next day over South Carolina.

Gordon first caused flooding in northern Costa Rica that destroyed 700 houses and caused $30 million in damage. There were six deaths in the country and an additional two deaths in neighboring Panama. Upon affecting Jamaica, the storm was responsible $11.8 million in damage and four deaths. Damage was heaviest in Haiti, after a prolonged southwesterly flow dropped 14 in (360 mm) of rainfall in a 24‑hour period. The rains resulted in extensive mudslides and flooding that disrupted transportation and damaged 10,800 houses, with another 3,500 destroyed. There were 1,122 deaths in the country, partially due to deforested hills, and damage was estimated at $50 million. In the neighboring Dominican Republic, there were five additional deaths, as well as flooding near its capital. In Cuba, Gordon caused $100 million in damage, and 5,906 houses were damaged or destroyed. Due to large-scale evacuations, there were only two deaths in the country. In Florida, the storm caused $400 million in damage (1994 USD, equivalent to about $800 million in 2024), much of it agricultural, and eleven people were killed, eight of them direct. Gordon later affected North Carolina with high waves, causing beach erosion and destroying five houses. Overall damage was $594 million due to Gordon (1994 USD, equivalent to about $900 million in 2024).

International governments and agencies through the United Nations sent relief supplies and monetary assistance to Haiti, following Gordon's devastating impact there. American soldiers were already stationed in the country to restore the ousted Jean-Bertrand Aristide to the presidency. The troops helped in rescues and worked to restore a damaged road between Port-au-Prince and Jacmel. Despite the high death toll and significant damage recorded, the name was not retired following the season.

== Meteorological history ==
Map plotting the storm's track and intensity, according to the Saffir–Simpson scale Map key Saffir–Simpson scale Tropical depression (≤38 mph, ≤62 km/h) Tropical storm (39–73 mph, 63–118 km/h) Category 1 (74–95 mph, 119–153 km/h) Category 2 (96–110 mph, 154–177 km/h) Category 3 (111–129 mph, 178–208 km/h) Category 4 (130–156 mph, 209–251 km/h) Category 5 (≥157 mph, ≥252 km/h) Unknown Storm type Tropical cyclone Subtropical cyclone Extratropical cyclone, remnant low, tropical disturbance, or monsoon depression

During the first week of November 1994, a large area of disturbed weather developed just north of Panama over the southwestern Caribbean Sea. A tropical wave passed through the area and gave it mild convection. A second wave passed through the area on November 6 and introduced cyclonic circulation to the disturbance. Over the next two days, the system gradually organized and sparked a deep convection off Nicaragua's southeast coast. This organization, with initial maximum sustained winds of 30 mph (48 km/h), was designated Tropical Depression Twelve. Moving northwest, the storm began to slowly strengthen and its upper-level outflow became favorable to further development. Spots of convection flared on the morning of November 9; banding features appeared as its center made landfall on the northeastern Nicaraguan coast near Puerto Cabezas. A full day later a trough to the storm's northwest over the Gulf of Mexico moved the depression offshore, to the northeast, and over the warm waters of the western Caribbean Sea. Fueled by these warm waters, on the night of November 9, it strengthened into Tropical Storm Gordon with 40 mph (64 km/h) winds.

Lacking firm movement because of weak steering currents, Gordon meandered north-northeast in the presence of mild west-southwesterly wind shear, unable to strengthen under the adverse conditions. By November 11, a trough prodded Gordon to the north-northeast at 8 mph (13 km/h), and it strengthened by 6 mph (9.7 km/h) as it moved through the central Caribbean Sea. The trough continued steering Gordon, bending it eastward towards Jamaica on the afternoon on November 12. Despite the warm waters, Gordon did not strengthen that day as strong upper-tropospheric shear hindered development, disorganized the upper-level circulation, and reduced its winds to 40 mph (64 km/h). The trough over southern Florida and the Gulf of Mexico continued to push Gordon eastward towards Jamaica. In the pre-dawn hours, the storm clipped the eastern edge of the island. Southwesterly wind shear kept the storm from developing beyond 45 mph (72 km/h), but neither the shear nor the landfall significantly disrupted the cyclone's organization. Accelerating, Gordon turned towards the northeast. Continued shear prevented the upper-level development needed for typical cyclonic organization, but a strong lower-level circulation had formed. Its sustained winds were still only 40 mph (64 km/h), but as the system approached eastern Cuba a gust of 120 mph (190 km/h) was reported. The center crossed near Guantánamo Bay. Meanwhile, the broad-scale circulation that was covering most of the Caribbean Sea (of which Tropical Storm Gordon was only a part) was interacting with an upper-tropospheric trough near the Straits of Florida. This trough strengthened the broad upper-level cyclone, which in turn strengthened Gordon and spawned several other low-level circulations in the western Caribbean Sea. When Gordon crossed eastern Cuba, the National Hurricane Center determined that it had become the most dominant of these low-level systems and had absorbed their convections. Meteorologist Jose Fernandez-Partagas voiced the minority opinion that Gordon's circulatory center had dissipated over Cuba and that a low-pressure system near the Bahamas was now the dominant system, which would have meant the demise of Tropical Storm Gordon and the emergence of a new tropical storm. By nightfall of November 13, Gordon had not only made two landfalls and survived interactions with three competing systems but also, in assimilating the Bahamian low, had gained the cool central core typical of a subtropical cyclone.

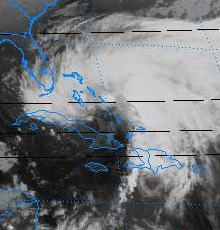
Gordon during its hybrid tropical/sub-tropical stage with a frontal band dropping rain over Haiti

The deep-layered cyclone within which Gordon was embedded steered the storm west-northwest, south of Turks and Caicos and the Bahamas, on November 14. A large ridge of high-pressure near the U.S. Mid-Atlantic coast increased the pressure gradient around the storm, so although its sub-tropical elements (namely a lack of deep convection) precluded a core of strong winds immediately around the storm's nucleus, strong winds were supported outside the storm's circulatory center. These winds inched up to 50 mph (80 km/h) but did not strengthen any further. The ridge continued to steer the storm west-northwestward past the western Bahamas. This brought the southern portion of the storm's circulation over northern Cuba. The storm's fourth landfall occurred on November 15 when Gordon passed over the Florida Keys near Key West, Florida. The storm then continued west over the lower Keys and into the Straits of Florida, where the storm's center began to warm and deep convection signaled the return of Gordon's purely tropical characteristics. Steering currents remained weak giving the storm a chance to fully re-develop its deep convection while immobile at sea.

After stalling offshore for almost a day, a mid- to upper-tropospheric trough over the central U.S. slowly pulled Tropical Storm Gordon northward then north-northeastward towards Florida's west coast. The storm made landfall between Ft. Myers and Naples with 50 mph (80 km/h) winds. The eastward component of the storm's movement increased, and Gordon moved northeastward onto the Florida Peninsula at 10 mph (16 km/h). The storm barely weakened as it crossed the landmass keeping its 50 mph (80 km/h) winds. Crossing the peninsula in a mere six hours, the storm continued to pick up speed. Early on November 17, back over the open ocean, the storm's central pressure began to fall. Improved organization was not apparent and wind shear was pulling at the core of the deep convection when, on November 17, Gordon suddenly spawned 75 mph (121 km/h) winds and was upgraded to a Category 1 hurricane.

The shortwave trough that had been steering Gordon across Florida moved ahead of the storm and its influence was replaced by a mid-tropospheric ridge over the eastern United States. Under the influence of this new ridge, the storm, which had been speeding northeast at 25 mph (40 km/h), turned to the north late on November 17. The hurricane's loop continued, and as it moved to a west-northwesterly heading Gordon briefly threatened North Carolina's Outer Banks before stalling offshore once again. In the presence of weak steering currents once again, Gordon lost strength and slipped back to tropical storm status with 70 mph (110 km/h) winds. On November 18, about 90 mi (140 km) off the Outer Banks, Gordon began a southward drift away from the North Carolina coast. Warm waters improved its organization, but this did not result in stronger winds and the storm continued to weaken. Strong upper-level winds battered the storm from the northwest. They sheared away Gordon's upper-level convection while polluting the storm with colder and drier air that weakened its lower level convection. A high-pressure system over the central United States drifted east and added a westward component to Gordon's southward motion, pulling the storm southwest towards Florida. The persistent shear and a continued lack of deep convection eventually reduced the storm's winds to below tropical storm force, and on the morning on November 20, Gordon became a tropical depression. The high pressure system over the continent continued pulling the depression towards the west until it made its final landfall near Cape Canaveral that night with winds of 30 mph (48 km/h). The storm moved northward across Florida, northeastward across Georgia, and finally merged with a frontal system over South Carolina.

== Preparations ==
When Gordon was approaching Jamaica on November 12, a tropical storm watch, and later warning, was issued for the island. The same day, a tropical storm warning was issued for southeastern Cuba from Camagüey to Guantanamo. On November 13, a tropical storm warning was issued for the southwest peninsula of Haiti, and later that day the same warning was issued for the Bahamas. Due to the storm, 65,000 people evacuated to safer locations in Cuba. Schools were closed in New Providence and Grand Bahama due to the storm, and Nassau International Airport was briefly shut down. A flight between Havana and Miami was canceled. In Cuba, officials forced 36,518 people to evacuate their homes, and workers also moved 68,780 livestock.

After Gordon emerged into the Atlantic north of Cuba, the National Hurricane Center issued a tropical storm warning for southern Florida from Jupiter to the Dry Tortugas, and later extended it to Boca Grande up along the west coast; this was extended to Bayport on the west coast and to Titusville on the east coast while the storm was approaching the Florida Keys. When Gordon attained hurricane status and turned suddenly to the northwest, a hurricane warning was issued from Bogue Banks to the North Carolina/Virginia border. Florida governor Lawton Chiles activated the state's Emergency Operations Center. In the Florida Keys, state parks were closed, which forced some campers to leave, and all schools were closed. On the mainland, University of Miami and Miami Dade College were also closed. Space Shuttle Atlantis was forced to land at Edwards Air Force Base in California instead of Kennedy Space Center. The storm caused flights to be canceled or delayed at Miami International Airport, and nearly all flights were canceled to and from the Florida Keys. Hundreds of people evacuated to shelters in five counties in east-central Florida. In North Carolina, officials suggested people in low-lying areas to go to higher ground, but they did not issue evacuation orders.

== Impact ==
Impact by area
Region	Deaths	Damage
Costa Rica	6	$30 million
Panama	2	Unknown
Jamaica	4	$11.8 million
Cuba	2	$102 million
Haiti	1,122	$50 million
Dominican Republic	5	Unknown
Florida	8	$400 million
North Carolina	0	$314,000
Total	1,149	$594 million

Although Gordon was a tropical storm for most of its existence, it caused enormous damage and loss of life. The United Nations estimated death toll in Haiti was 1,122. Six deaths were reported in Costa Rica, five in the Dominican Republic, two in Jamaica, two in Cuba, and eight in Florida. Property damage to the United States was estimated at $400 million (1994 USD$, 869 million 2026 USD). Property damage statistics for the other affected areas are not available, but were reportedly severe in both Haiti and Cuba. The high death toll from Gordon made it the deadliest Atlantic hurricane since Hurricane David in 1979, which killed thousands in the Dominican Republic.

=== Central America ===
The first location affected by Gordon was Central America, when it briefly moved over northeastern Nicaragua as a tropical depression. Severe localized flooding occurred in Nicaragua, Panama, and most significantly Costa Rica. There, several days of heavy rainfall damaged about 180 mi (290 km) of roads and bridges, mostly in rural areas. In Upala in the northern portion of the country, the rains damaged beans and rice crops. More than 700 homes were destroyed, leaving about 4,000 people homeless. Nationwide, the system killed six people and caused $30 million in damage. In Panama, the floods killed two people.

=== Jamaica ===
While passing south of Jamaica, Gordon dropped heavy rainfall, reaching 7.44 in (189 mm). The rains caused flooding in six parishes, mostly in Clarendon and Saint Catherine. The rains caused flooding and mudslides that blocked roads. Gordon left $11.8 million in damage, mostly in Clarendon. About half of the overall damage was related to roads, and an additional quarter was due to crop damage. There were four deaths and two injuries in the country. Two of the deaths were drownings.

=== Hispaniola ===
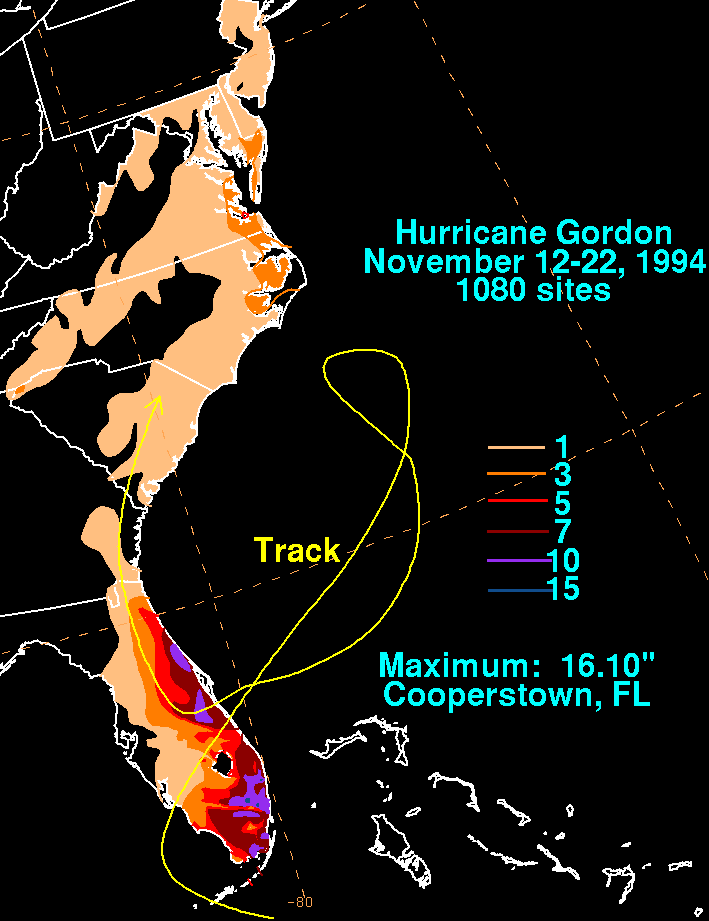
Rainfall totals from Hurricane Gordon

The broad circulation of Gordon produced a persistent southerly flow across Hispaniola, causing orographic lift in mountainous regions. This caused a prolonged period of heavy rainfall, reaching 14 in (360 mm) in Les Cayes in a 24‑hour period, and over 9 in (230 mm) in the same duration in the capital city, Port-au-Prince. 22.94 in (583 mm) of rain was recorded at Camp-Perrin. In Jacmel, Gordon dropped 13 in (330 mm) in about 12 hours. The rains resulted in flooding and landslides across the country. There was knee-deep flooding in the shantytown of Cité Soleil, and in Jacmel, the rains increased levels along three rivers. There, the storm washed out the road connecting with Port-au-Prince, and three bridges were destroyed. In Jacmel, 725 houses were destroyed, forcing 1,500 people to stay at shelters. Gordon left portions of southeastern Haiti without water access. About 10,800 houses were damaged to some degree, and an additional 3,500 homes were destroyed. About 1.5 million people were directly affected in the country, mostly near Port-au-Prince and in the southern portion, and more than 89,000 people were left homeless. In Port-au-Prince, about 20,000 homes were flooded, and the bridge connecting the city with northern Haiti was also flooded. Overall damage in the country was estimated at $50 million.

The floods and mudslides killed many people in Haiti, although the exact total will likely never be known. On November 19, officials reported 531 deaths, and by two days later the total was potentially as high as 2,000. On November 24, the death toll reached 824, and the United Nations Office for the Coordination of Humanitarian Affairs reported on December 21 that Gordon killed 1,122 people in the country. Most of the deaths occurred in Port-au-Prince, Jacmel, and Léogâne. Damage was heavier in Haiti than elsewhere along Gordon's track due to poor infrastructure consisting of shacks on flood-prone denuded hills. The country suffers large death tolls from many hurricanes, caused in part by human activity. Large-scale deforestation left Haiti with about 1.4% of its forests as of 2004, leaving denuded mountain slopes that allows rainwater to wash down unimpeded. The lack of tree cover contributed to the devastating floods that caused most of Gordon's deaths.

In neighboring Dominican Republic, Gordon caused flooding and landslides that disrupted travel and communications to the interior portions of the country. Several slums around Santo Domingo flooded. The storm killed five people in the country.

=== Cuba and Bahamas ===
Shortly after moving over Jamaica, Gordon crossed over eastern Cuba. At Guantanamo Bay Naval Base, a station recorded 69 mph (111 km/h) sustained winds, with gusts to 120 mph (190 km/h) during a microburst. The winds were not representative of the storm, and Gordon's landfall intensity was estimated at 46 mph (74 km/h). The storm caused widespread power outages and forced several roads to close. Damage was heaviest in Guantánamo Province, where 9 mi (14 km) of seawalls and two aqueducts were destroyed. The storm damaged or destroyed 43 bridges, damaged 1,106 mi (1,780 km) of roads, and wrecked 16.5 mi (26.6 km) of rail lines. About 3 mi (4.8 km) of underground electrical cables were damaged. There was heavy agricultural damage in southeastern Cuba, estimated at $45 million. Gordon damaged 7,482 acres (3,028 hectares) of sugar cane fields and damaged or destroyed about 5.5 million banana trees. About 100,000 sacks of coffee were wrecked, amounting to $3.5 million in damage, and 50,000 litres of milk were ruined. While Gordon was paralleling northern Cuba, it produced high seas that caused flooding, including in Havana. Nationwide, the storm damaged 5,750 houses and destroyed 156 others. The cost of damage and reconstruction of homes and roads was $47.4 million, and there was an additional $9.5 million in damage to public buildings. Gordon killed two people in the country, which was kept to a minimum due to evacuations, and damage totaled $102 million. Two people were injured at Guantanamo Bay Naval Base. The flooding from Gordon followed two other similarly damaging events in the preceding year.

Gordon also affected the nearby Bahamas, producing 46 mph (74 km/h) sustained winds at Kemps Bay, Andros.

=== Florida ===
In the Florida Keys, wind gusts up to 49 mph (79 km/h) caused minor damage to trees and motor homes. Intense rainbands caused flooding in low-lying and poorly-draining areas, mostly in the upper Florida Keys. High tides closed portions of U.S. 1. Winds reached 60 mph (97 km/h) near Palm Beach. In the Tampa Bay area, outer rainbands downed power lines and trees, one of which fell onto a car. Between its three Floridian landfalls, Hurricane Gordon dumped 5–10 in (130–250 mm) of rain on Florida, with a station at Cooperstown recording 16.1 in (410 mm).

The external tank used on Space Shuttle mission STS-71 was involved in an at-sea rescue during the storm and a subsequent court case. The tank was being delivered by barge to the launch site when the tow vehicle encountered issues on November 15 due to the storm. Their mayday signal was picked up by an oil tanker, which responded and towed the tug and its cargo to safety. NASA offered $5 million to the crew of the tanker as a reward, but the United States Department of Justice reduced the offer to $1 million. The tanker company and crew sued and were awarded $6.4 million, believed to be the largest such award in U.S. history. This was reduced to $4.125 million on appeal.

While Gordon was moving across southern Florida, Virginia Key reported sustained winds of 53 mph (85 km/h), which was the highest in the state. Gusts reached 83 mph (134 km/h) at a location in southern Dade County. Similar to the Caribbean, the storm dropped heavy rainfall in southern Florida, with widespread areas reporting over 6 in (150 mm) in the eastern portion of the state. Rainfall peaked at 16.1 in (410 mm) in Coopertown. High waves from Gordon severely eroded beaches along the state's eastern coastline, and damaged coral and artificial reef systems. Waves flooded coastal roads up to 2 ft (0.61 m) deep in Miami Beach, and also damaged seawalls. Near Fort Lauderdale, the storm washed a 508 ft (155 m) cargo ship aground less than 150 ft (46 m) from the beach. Several other boats sank or were beached, which prompted 37 rescues. One woman was rescued after being swept 3,000 ft (910 m) off a fishing pier in Boynton Beach. Gordon spawned six tornadoes in the state, of which two did no damage and two caused minor damage. A tornado in Lake Worth damaged 39 homes and two businesses. The most damaging tornado was an F2 in southern Brevard County, which originated as a waterspout and moved onshore near Barefoot Bay. It moved through a mobile home community, destroying 62 homes and damaging 227 others to some extent; damage from the tornado was estimated at $10 million. The same tornado injured 40 people, causing six to be hospitalized, and killed an elderly man who died due to head trauma.

Across Florida, Gordon's winds damaged power lines and knocked down trees and traffic signals; about 425,000 people lost power due to the storm. The rains caused flooding in Dade and Collier counties, which damaged $275 million worth of crops, mostly to vegetables and sugar cane. In some locations, the crop damage was worse than during Hurricane Andrew in 1992, due to fewer crops being planted when Andrew struck the state. Along Elliott Key, Gordon damaged the coral reef system to a greater extent than Andrew. Inland flooding damaged buildings due to fast-rising water and roof collapses. In Volusia County, floods entered 1,236 buildings, causing $26 million in damage. Flooding caused dozens of roads to close, some of which were washed out. In the Everglades, flooding killed several deer. Statewide, two people drowned in separate instances after driving into flooded areas. Three people drowned along beaches, including one man who died in a rip current while attempting to rescue his son. In Hillsboro Inlet, two people drowned after their boat was overturned by high waves. Throughout Florida, Gordon directly killed eight people, and injured 43 people. There were also three indirect deaths; two were from traffic accidents, and one was related to a heart attack after a person pushed a stalled car in a flooded road. Statewide damage was estimated at $400 million (1994 USD$, 869 million 2026 USD).

=== Remainder of United States ===
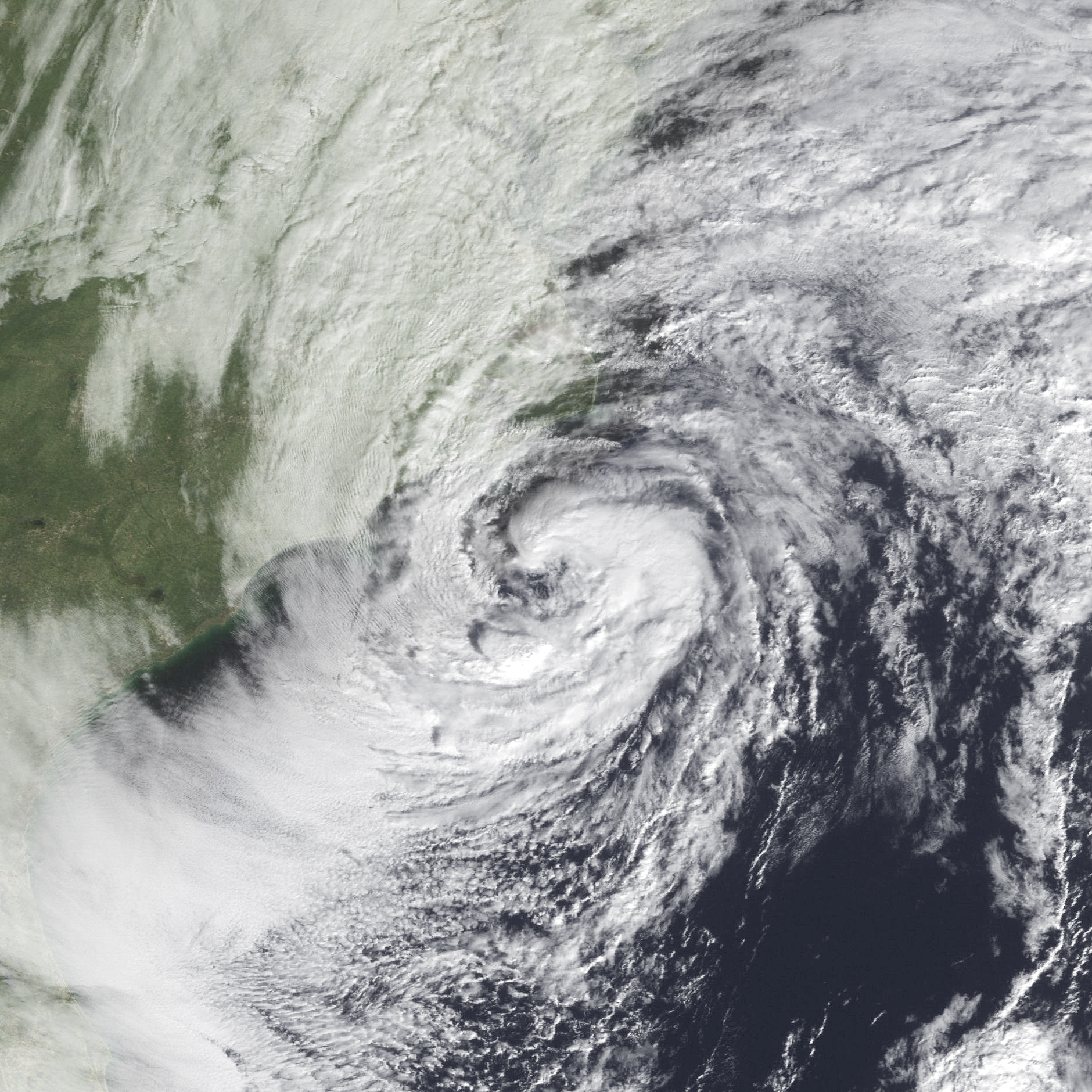
Hurricane Gordon offshore the Outer Banks

After affecting Florida, Gordon produced rainfall along much of the eastern United States, extending as far north as New Jersey. In North Carolina, rainfall peaked at 4.96 in (126 mm) in New Holland, and in Virginia the highest rainfall total was 5.25 in (133 mm) near Norfolk. Sustained winds in the Hatteras, North Carolina area peaked at 50 mph (80 km/h) in Buxton. Just offshore at Diamond Shoal Light, a station reported 10-minute sustained winds of 71 mph (114 km/h). The hurricane produced tides of 2.7 ft (0.82 m) above normal in Frisco.

High waves and tides resulted in significant beach erosion along the Outer Banks. The waves closed several portions of North Carolina Highway 12 for up to four days, and also closed a portion of U.S. Route 70 in eastern Carteret County. Heavy dune damage occurred on Ocracoke Island. North of Hatteras Village, the high waves washed out 225 ft (69 m) of dunes, and portions of the Outer Banks between Hatteras and Frisco were flooded up to 2.5 ft (0.76 m) deep. The effects were similar to that of the 1991 Perfect Storm, although damage was lighter during Gordon. The hurricane destroyed five homes in Kitty Hawk, which were condemned after being previously damaged by Hurricane Emily in 1993. Also in Kitty Hawk, the storm damaged 52 houses and 2 businesses. In Rodanthe, two homes sustained water damage. The cost of the storm in the state was estimated at $314,000. Effects further south in North Carolina were lesser, although serious beach erosion was reported.

Offshore, a family of four required rescue from the Coast Guard after their boat began filling with water in the midst of 17 ft (5.2 m) surf. A 49 ft (15 m) sailboat was disabled about 115 mi (185 km) offshore Norfolk, Virginia, and the crew of three were also rescued by the Coast Guard. The sailboat was sailing from Bermuda to Oxford, Maryland, but was halted after the engine failed, the anchor was ripped off, and the mainstay was torn. The interaction between Gordon and a ridge over New England produced coastal flooding in eastern Virginia. Tides reached 4 ft (1.2 m) above normal in Virginia Beach, which washed away 100 ft (30 m) of a fishing pier. The high tides caused road damage and minor housing damage.

== Aftermath ==
In Costa Rica, President José María Figueres declared a state of emergency due to flooding in that country. He sought $15 million in aid from the Inter-American Development Bank. The country's government handled relief efforts through its Red Cross and federal and non-governmental organizations. The government of Cuba issued an appeal to the United Nations Office for the Coordination of Humanitarian Affairs for financial assistance; as a result, the agency provided $30,000, and the United Nations Development Programme provided $50,000. The government of Luxembourg sent $37,000 worth of construction materials, and the European Union sent $443,000 to the country.

On November 16, the government of Haiti issued an appeal to the international community for assistance. In response, agencies through the United Nations donated $735,000, including 20,000 water units and 3,000 blankets. The United Nations Office for the Coordination of Humanitarian Affairs flew 30 tons of supplies, financed by Italy and Luxembourg. The European Union donated about $3.8 million to the country, and various countries sent about $1.8 million in cash or the equivalent thereof in relief items. The Canadian government donated $485,000, and the government of Japan sent $400,000 in aid. The government of France provided blankets, clothing, and tarpaulins, and the United States sent 5,000 blankets. In the days after the storm, the Haitian Army and international workers made emergency repairs to the road between Jacmel and Port-au-Prince, which was permanently reopened on November 25. The Haitian government provided $3.2 million to repair damage and assist those affected by the storm. The government sent about $112,000 to cities to provide for clearing roads, housing repairs, and for the funerals of storm victims. Workers from the United Nations set up relief work in Port-au-Prince. Assistance quickly reached the ravaged town of Jacmel, including 116 tons of food, 9 tons of medicine, and clothing. Six soldiers from the United States Special Forces rescued 35 Haitians using an inflatable boat. About 100 soldiers from the 10th Mountain Division assisted in relief operations in Jacmel, rescuing hundreds of people. About 12,000 United States troops were already in the country when Gordon struck to restore democracy under ousted president Jean-Bertrand Aristide.

Due to the crop damage in Florida, the price of vegetables across the United States rose. There were about 25,000 insurance claims following the storm's passage.

Despite the devastation in Haiti and the extensive damage in Cuba and Florida, Gordon was not retired by the World Meteorological Organization in Spring of 1995. Out of all the names on the North Atlantic naming list that have not been retired, Gordon is still considered the strongest candidate for retirement. The World Meteorological Organization issued an official statement crediting Jamaica and Cuba's warning infrastructure for the low loss of life there from Gordon, and blaming Haiti's lack of such a system for the large number of deaths there.

To this day, Gordon remains the deadliest hurricane to not have its name retired.

== See also ==
- Other storms of the same name
- List of Category 1 Atlantic hurricanes
- List of North Carolina hurricanes (1980–1999)
- List of Florida hurricanes (1975–1999)
- Geography of Haiti
- 1935 Jérémie hurricane – killed up to 2,000 people in Haiti
- Tropical Storm Fay (2008) – Took a similar winding path through the Caribbean and Florida
- Hurricane Eta (2020) – Deadly Category 4 hurricane that took a similar winding path through the Caribbean and Florida later in its lifetime
