= Tropical Storm Debby (1994) =

Atlantic tropical storm in 1994

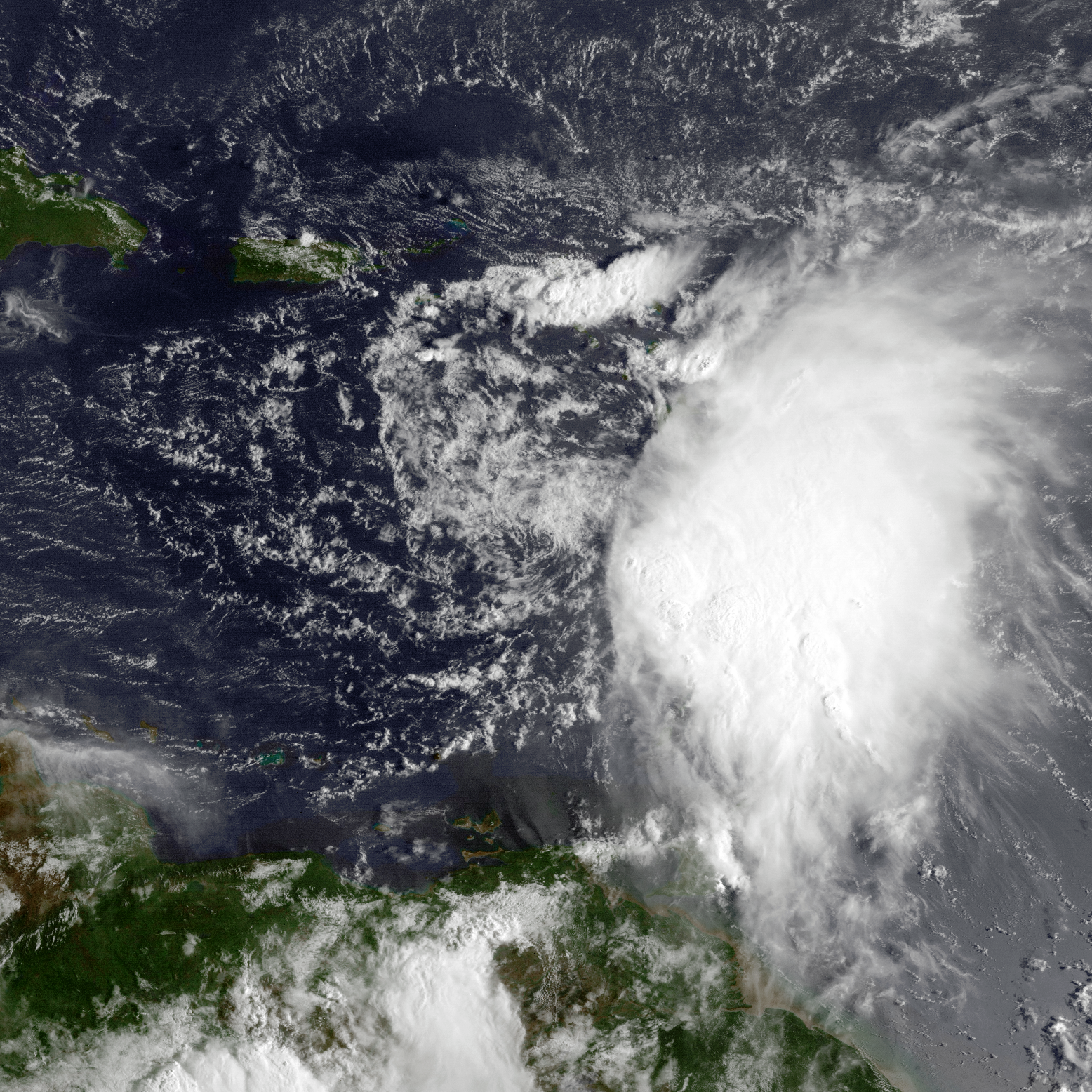
- Tropical Storm Debby in the Caribbean Sea on September 10

Meteorological history
- Formed: September 9, 1994
- Dissipated: September 11, 1994

Tropical storm
- 1-minute sustained (SSHWS/NWS)
- Highest winds: 70 mph (110 km/h)
- Lowest pressure: 1006 mbar (hPa); 29.71 inHg

Overall effects
- Fatalities: 9 total
- Damage: $115 million (1994 USD)
- Areas affected: Leeward Islands, Puerto Rico, Dominican Republic
- IBTrACS
- Part of the 1994 Atlantic hurricane season

Tropical Storm Debby was a weak but costly tropical cyclone that affected the Lesser Antilles in September 1994. It was the fourth named tropical storm of the 1994 Atlantic hurricane season; it developed on September 9 east of Barbados. Debby made landfall on Saint Lucia early on September 10, producing heavy rainfall and tropical storm-force wind gusts. The rains caused flooding and landslides, damaging about half of the island's banana plantations. Several villages were isolated after roads and bridges were damaged. Damage totaled about $103 million (1994 USD). On nearby Dominica, Debby damaged crops and fisheries.

While Debby was crossing Saint Lucia, its strongest thunderstorms were located north and east of the center due to wind shear. A station in Martinique reported hurricane-force winds, and about 20,000 people on the island lost power. After entering the eastern Caribbean Sea, Debby attained peak winds of 70 mph (110 km/h), although continued wind shear caused the storm to dissipate on September 11. In Puerto Rico, one person died due to high waves. The storm caused power outages and flooding in the Dominican Republic. Throughout its path, Debby killed nine people.

== Meteorological history ==
Map plotting the storm's track and intensity, according to the Saffir–Simpson scale Map key Saffir–Simpson scale Tropical depression (≤38 mph, ≤62 km/h) Tropical storm (39–73 mph, 63–118 km/h) Category 1 (74–95 mph, 119–153 km/h) Category 2 (96–110 mph, 154–177 km/h) Category 3 (111–129 mph, 178–208 km/h) Category 4 (130–156 mph, 209–251 km/h) Category 5 (≥157 mph, ≥252 km/h) Unknown Storm type Tropical cyclone Subtropical cyclone Extratropical cyclone, remnant low, tropical disturbance, or monsoon depression

The origins of Tropical Storm Debby were from a tropical wave that moved off the coast of Africa on September 4. By September 6, satellite images indicated a vigorous tropical wave with intense convection about midway between Africa and the Lesser Antilles. Encountering northwesterly vertical wind shear, convection markedly decreased and weakened on the following day, only to redevelop on September 8 after the shear dropped. Post-analysis indicate that the sixth tropical depression of the season developed on September 9 at 1200 UTC, about 185 mi (300 km) east of Barbados; however, it was not operationally classified as Tropical Depression Six until almost 24 hours later. Early on September 10, satellite imagery indicated a surface circulation just north of Barbados, around which time the National Hurricane Center (NHC) initiated advisories.

The increasing organization of the tropical depression prompted a reconnaissance aircraft investigation, which reported flight-level winds of around 70 mph (110 km/h) in an intense rainband northeast of the center. The same flight estimated surface winds of 58 mph (93 km/h), which indicated that the depression intensified into Tropical Storm Debby. However, ongoing wind shear removed all thunderstorms from the circulation. At 0300 UTC on September 10, the storm made landfall on Saint Lucia with winds of 65 mph (105 km/h). Although Debby was not very well-organized on satellite imagery, stations on Martinique and nearby ships reported that the storm intensified further in the eastern Caribbean Sea to a peak strength of 70 mph (110 km/h) at 0600 UTC. Such winds were not known while the storm was active, and around the time of Debby's peak intensity, the NHC operationally estimated winds of only 40 mph (64 km/h). The storm continued quickly to the west-northwest, affected by strong wind shear while maintaining strong winds. A reconnaissance flight on September 12 did not observe a closed circulation; as a result, it is estimated that Debby dissipated at around 0600 UTC that day to the south of Puerto Rico. The remnants of Debby continued to the west and diminished over Mexico on September 15, although residual clouds spread into the Gulf of Mexico.

== Preparations and impact ==
When the first advisory was issued for Debby, the governments of Barbados, Saint Lucia, Saint Vincent, and Dominica issued tropical storm warnings. In addition, the Saint Lucia Meteorological Service issued a flood warning before Debby developed. Although the NHC recommended a tropical storm warning to be issued in Martinique, government officials there issued a heavy rain warning instead. Debby first affected Barbados as it passed the island to the north, producing winds of 27 mph (43 km/h). In Saint Vincent to the southwest of Barbados, there was minor roof damage. In Dominica to the north, the storm damaged roads and caused power outages. Across Dominica, the combination of winds and heavy rains damaged 2,800 acres of bananas, 143 acres of plantains, 355 acres of root crops, and 355 acres of tree crops. Damage to crops and fisheries were estimated at EC$30 million ($12 million 1994 USD). After the storm, Windward Islands Crop Insurance (WINCROP) paid 2189 claims in the country, amounting to EC$1.6 million ($660,000 1994 USD).

Tropical Storm Debby struck Saint Lucia, and wind gusts on the island reached 46 mph (74 km/h) in Vigie. Damage throughout Debby's path was heaviest on this island, and the storm affected most of Saint Lucia. Debby produced heavy rainfall and thunderstorms over a six-hour period, which caused flooding along rivers and in low-lying areas. High rainfall totals wrecked houses on hillsides, forcing about 150 people to evacuate to shelters. Roadways were washed out or covered by landslides, and 10 bridges were destroyed or severely damaged. This limited access to villages across the island. Landslides also affected the town of Fond Saint-Jacques. Heavy rains covered Hewanorra International Airport with 2 in (51 mm) of silt, and in Anse La Raye, floods reached waist-deep levels. In that town, residents had to be rescued by boat. The storm damaged about half of the banana plantations on the island. Several towns lost access to their water supplies, which prompted the governments of Martinique and Saint Vincent to provide fresh water to the country. Overall, there were 24 injuries and 4 deaths across Saint Lucia; all of the deaths were from two landslides. During the storm, nine prisoners escaped the jail in Castries, and there were also reports of looting. In the capital city of Castries, the storm damaged a ward of an evacuated hospital; it had been scheduled for reconstruction, and the effects from Debby provided a new assessment for the rebuilding. Damage on Saint Lucia was estimated at EC$250 million ($103 million 1994 USD). After the storm, WINCROP paid 5,802 claims for insured crop damage in the country, totaling EC$7.8 million ($3.2 million 1994 USD). As of 2008, Debby was the largest event in WINCROP's 20-year history of insurance claims for disasters. The Saint Lucia government responded to the damage from Debby by repairing damaged buildings and bridges, diversifying crops, and removing silt from major rivers.

While Debby was moving across Saint Lucia, a station in Le Vauclin in southeastern Martinique reported 10 minute sustained winds of 64 mph (103 km/h), with a gust to 97 mph (156 km/h); the observation provided the basis for Debby's peak intensity. When the storm was active, however, the strongest winds known at the time were a 10-minute wind of 35 mph (56 km/h), and a gust of 58 mph (93 km/h) at Martinique Aimé Césaire International Airport. About half of the island experienced 4 in (100 mm) of precipitation, and the highest rainfall total on the island was 7.24 in (184 mm) in Saint-Joseph. High rains caused flooding across the island, and one woman drowned when a flooded river washed away her car. High winds downed trees and covered some roads, and there was damage to the banana crop. About 20,000 people lost power during the storm.

When Debby was still active, a NASA satellite fired lasers at the storm to measure cloud heights, the first such experiment. As Debby moved into the Caribbean Sea, a tropical storm warning was issued for Puerto Rico and the United States Virgin Islands. High winds spread across Puerto Rico; Luis Muñoz Marín International Airport reported a peak wind gust of 44 mph (71 km/h). The winds downed trees and power lines across the island and caused isolated roof and house damage. High seas entered several coastal homes and prevented ferry passage from Culebra. In Cabo Rojo, Puerto Rico, high waves swept away two men fishing from the coast; one was injured and the other was killed. Later, a tropical storm warning was issued for the southern coasts of the Dominican Republic and Haiti. After Debby dissipated, its remnants maintained strong winds, and a station in the Dominican Republic reported a gust of 62 mph (100 km/h) on September 11. The storm downed power lines, leaving hundreds of homes without electricity and contributing to three deaths. An expressway and some rivers also flooded in the country.

== See also ==
- Other storms of the same name
- Tropical Storm Erika (2015) – followed a similar track
