= List of storms named Debby =

The name Debby has been used for eight tropical cyclones in the Atlantic Ocean:

- Hurricane Debby (1982) – reached Category 4 strength, grazed Bermuda, and caused high winds at Cape Race, but no significant damage
- Hurricane Debby (1988) – made landfall at Tuxpan, Veracruz, killing ten; later became Tropical Depression 17-E in the eastern Pacific
- Tropical Storm Debby (1994) – formed near and passed over Saint Lucia, causing severe flooding and mudslides, and later dissipated over Hispanola; nine deaths were reported
- Hurricane Debby (2000) – was a disorganized storm that caused minor damage to the Leeward Islands and the Greater Antilles
- Tropical Storm Debby (2006) – formed south of Cape Verde and dissipated in the Central Atlantic
- Tropical Storm Debby (2012) – formed near the Yucatán peninsula, and made landfall in Florida
- Tropical Storm Debby (2018) – did not affect land
- Hurricane Debby (2024) – destructive Category 1 hurricane that caused severe flooding in the Gulf Coast of Florida, East Coast of the United States, and Canada, becoming the costliest in Quebec and Canadian history

== See also ==
- Storm Debi (2023) – a European windstorm with a similar name
