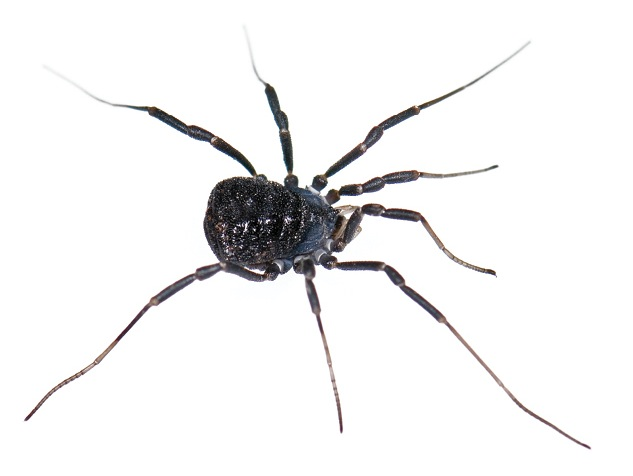
- Acuclavella shoshone

Scientific classification
- Domain: Eukaryota
- Kingdom: Animalia
- Phylum: Arthropoda
- Subphylum: Chelicerata
- Class: Arachnida
- Order: Opiliones
- Superfamily: Ischyropsalidoidea
- Genus: Ceratolasmatidae; Shear, 1986

Species
- see text

Diversity
- 11 species

= Ceratolasmatidae =

Family of harvestmen/daddy longlegs

The Ceratolasmatidae are a family of harvestmen with eleven described species.

The monophyly of this family is questionable; it is composed of three possibly monophyletic groups:

- Ceratolasma and Acuclavella are four to six millimeters long, with moderately short legs and short pedipalps. These two genera are closely related to Ischyropsalis (Ischyropsalididae).
- Hesperonemastoma species range from one to two millimeters in body length. They have similarities to Nemastoma, which occurs in the Old World (hespero = "west" alludes to the occurrence in the New World). It seems to be more closely related to Taracus (Sabaconidae) than to Ceratolasma.
- Crosbycus has a body length of less than one millimeter. The pedipalps are long and very thin. Its moderately long legs are densely covered with setae, spikes and trichomes. Crosbycus should possibly be placed in its own family.

== Distribution ==
The family is restricted to North America, from California to British Columbia. Crosbycus is also found in Eastern Asia.

== Name ==
The genus name is a combination of Ancient Greek keras "horn" and the ending -lasma, referring to the similarity of genera such as Ortholasma and Dendrolasma (Nemastomatidae).

== Species ==
- Acuclavella Shear, 1986
  - Acuclavella cosmetoides Shear, 1986 -- Idaho
  - Acuclavella merickeli Shear, 1986 -- Idaho
  - Acuclavella quattuor Shear, 1986 -- Idaho
  - Acuclavella shoshone Shear, 1986 -- Idaho
- Ceratolasma Goodnight & Goodnight, 1942
  - Ceratolasma tricantha Goodnight & Goodnight, 1942 -- Oregon
- Crosbycus Roewer, 1914
  - Crosbycus dasycnemus (Crosby, 1911) -- British Columbia and China
- Hesperonemastoma Gruber, 1970
  - Hesperonemastoma pallidimaculosum (Goodnight & Goodnight, 1945) -- Alabama
  - Hesperonemastoma inops (Packard, 1884) -- cave in Kentucky
  - Hesperonemastoma modestum (Banks, 1894) -- western United States
  - Hesperonemastoma packardi (Roewer, 1914) -- cave in Utah
  - Hesperonemastoma kepharti (Crosby & Bishop, 1924) -- North Carolina
