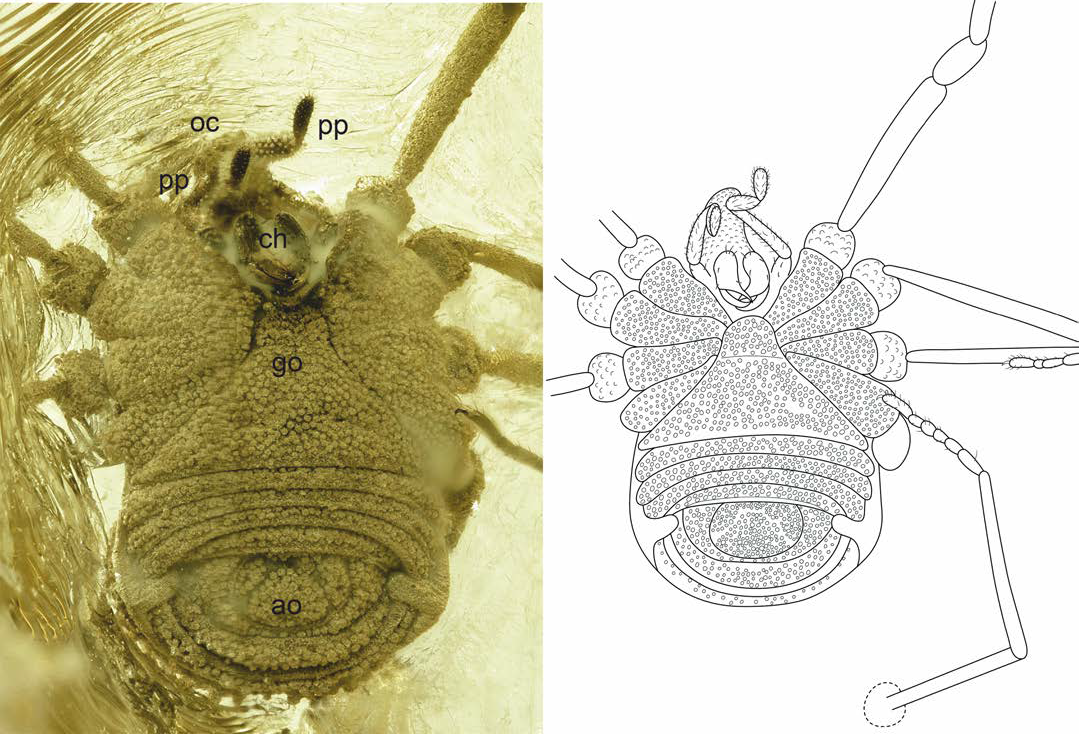
- Paratype specimen

Scientific classification
- Kingdom: Animalia
- Phylum: Arthropoda
- Subphylum: Chelicerata
- Class: Arachnida
- Order: Opiliones
- Family: Nemastomatidae
- Subfamily: Ortholasmatinae
- Genus: †Balticolasma; Bartel et al., 2026
- Species: †B. wunderlichi

Binomial name
- †Balticolasma wunderlichi Bartel et al., 2026

= Balticolasma =

Balticolasma Temporal range: Eocene, 33.90–37.71 Ma

Extinct arachnid genus

Balticolasma is an extinct genus of troguloid harvestman belonging to the subfamily Ortholasmatinae. It is known from Baltic and Rovno amber (Eocene, 33.9 to 37.71 million years ago) of Eastern Europe.

== Discovery and naming ==
The specimens collected originate from private collections, with Jörg Wunderlich having one from Baltic amber and Jonas Damzen having one from Rovno amber (northwestern Ukraine). The exact localities of these specimens are currently not known. They are now contained in the Museum für Naturkunde in Berlin, Germany. The male specimen has been designated MB.A. 4454, while the female has been designated MB.A. 4455. The male is interpreted as such due to the presence of cheliceral apophyses.

The fossil specimens of Balticolasma were the first on which high-resolution computed tomography was applied using synchrotron radiation.

The genus name is in reference to the region it was found in, the Baltics. The suffix "lasama" is commonly applied to a number of closely related modern ortholasmatine genera. The species name is in honor of Jörg Wunderlich, a German paleontologist who worked extensively on spiders preserved in amber.

== Description ==
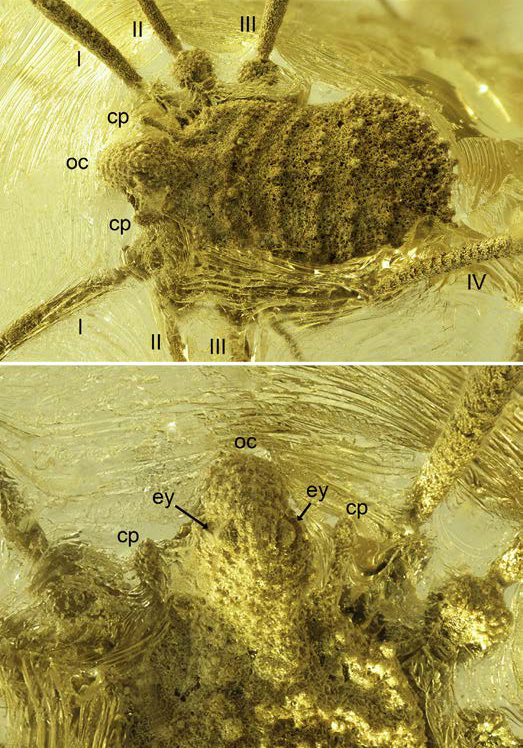
Dorsal view of the paratype specimen

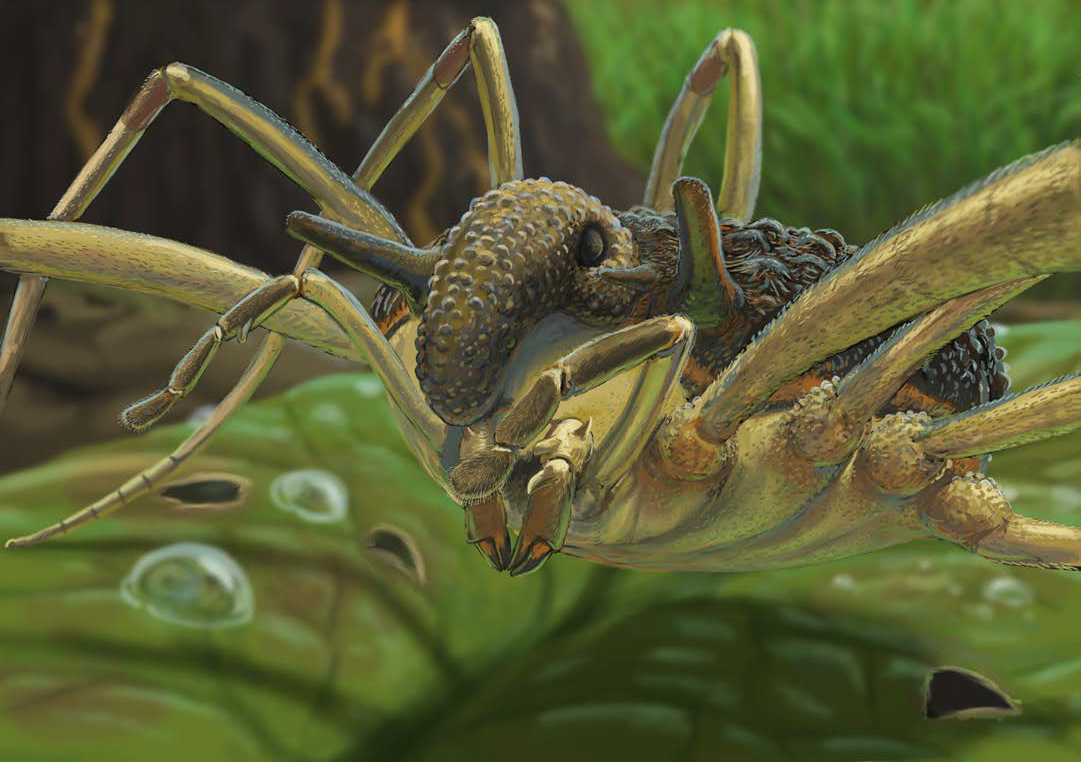
Life restoration by Joschua Knüppe

Balticolasma is a relatively small genus, with a body length of 3 millimeters, excluding the hood. It has a flattened oval body shape. Its chelicerae are relatively small and mostly smooth. It has dorsal ornamentation in the form of a complex and irregular fine weave composed of filamentous elements. It has long, sometimes granulated, legs. Leg II is the longest, and the femur (patella I and III) is somewhat thickened.

== Taxonomy ==
This genus is a harvestman, which is an order of arachnids. The lack of a pedipalp claw and a large ocularium extending anteriorly in the form of a hood is strong evidence for its placement within the suborder Dyspnoi. It is likely not a member of the family Trogulidae due to the presence of cheliceral and pedipalpal apophyses and the more than two tarsomeres located on leg II. It is also not likely a member of the family Dicranolasmatidae due to its eyes being located on a bifurcating hood. While the dorsal tuberculation of Balticolasma has superficial similarities to members of the family Ceratolasmatidae and in particular Ceratolasma, it is not a member due to the differences in the overall structure of the pedipalps and the presence of pedipalp apophyses. Furthermore, the hood seen in Ceratolasma is simple and nearly horizontal, extending in a blunt club.

This genus shares the most similarities with the subfamily ortholasmatine and specifically with the extant genus Cryptolasma. Similar features include the presence of cheliceral and pedipalpal apophyses, large lateral carapace processes, flattened bodies, and the hood.
