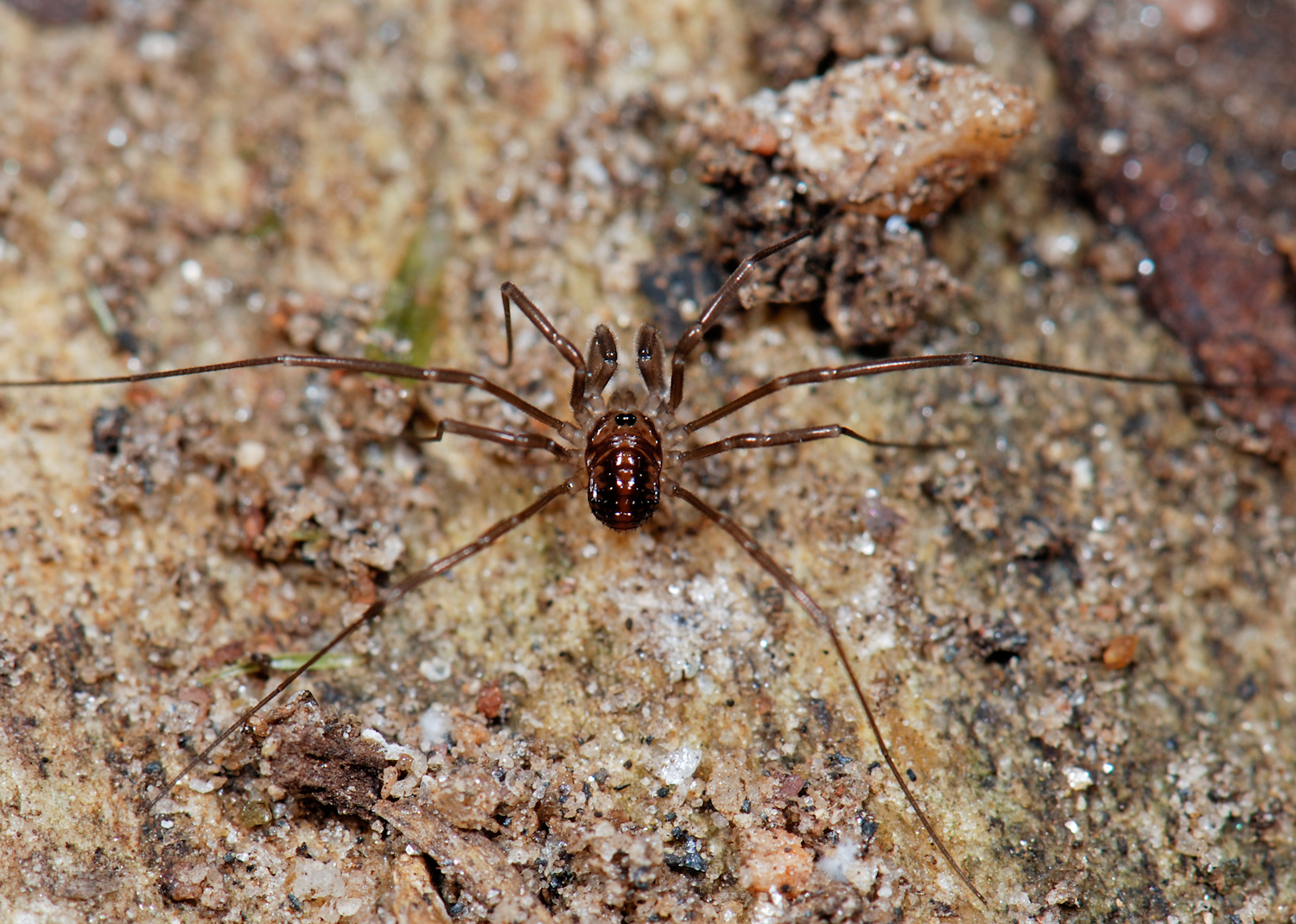
- S. cavicolens

Scientific classification
- Kingdom: Animalia
- Phylum: Arthropoda
- Subphylum: Chelicerata
- Class: Arachnida
- Order: Opiliones
- Family: Sabaconidae; Dresco, 1970
- Genus: Sabacon; Simon, 1879

Type species
- Sabacon paradoxus Simon, 1879

Diversity
- >50 species

= Sabacon =

Sabacon Temporal range: Palaeogene–present

Genus of harvestmen/daddy longlegs

Sabacon is a genus of the monotypic harvestman family Sabaconidae, with 59 species (as of 2023).

== Description ==
Species of the genus Sabacon have usually thickened pedipalps with stiff, fine hairs, which is unique among harvestmen. Although the small eye tubercle is usually not ornamented, there is a spine on one Nepalese species. Males have long, thin legs, females are stouter.

While the Asian and North American species are easy to differentiate from one another by male genital traits. The various European species are very similar to each other, and can be closely related to Sabacon cavicolens from the eastern United States. Another American species Sabacon mitchelli, which, like the larger S. cavicolens also occurs in the eastern United States, notably lacks cheliceral glands in the male. Species from the western United States seem closely related to Asian forms. Sabacon astoriensis, initially collected from dried seaweed and debris in beach dunes from Oregon, is morphologically similar to the Asian species Sabacon dentipalpis and Sabacon makinoi.

== Range ==
Sabacon species exhibits a wide, yet highly disjunct, distribution. Species can be found throughout North America, Europe, and Asia, though individual species usually have very restricted distributions.

The genus Sabacon is widespread in the temperate northern hemisphere, even extending into the subarctic, with the most southern records from caves in the southeastern United States and high elevations in Nepal. The center of diversification seems to be in Asia, where many species were described from Japan, Korea and Nepal. Some species occur in Europe.

== Ecology ==
Almost all Sabacon species prefer moist, cool microhabitats, and many species live in caves, but none are modified for cave life. Outside of caves they are often found in forests or shaded ravines.

== Etymology ==
The name of the type genus is supposedly derived from "Sabacon", an Egyptian ruler. Consequentially, genus name is treated as masculine, although before its derivation was clarified some authors or online sources mistakenly treated it as neuter, e.g. Joel Hallan's Biology Catalog.

== Fossil record ==
There is one extinct species †Sabacon claviger, known from Eocene Baltic amber. Another named species †Sabacon bachofeni also from Baltic amber was later revised as its junior synonym. Staręga (2002: p. 602) indicates that for all such the Baltic Amber material, "The Eocene locality fits into the present range of the genus Sabacon"

== Relationships ==
Sabaconidae belongs to the superfamily Ischyropsalidoidea. The family Sabaconidae originally consisted of just the genus Sabacon, though Taracus was later added to the family. Hesperonemastoma was later transferred in to further expand this family after molecular studies confirmed it was closely related to Taracus. However, a new family, Taracidae, was then erected for Hesperonemastoma and Taracus, leaving Sabaconidae restored once again with just a single genus (i.e. monogeneric). Currently, Sabaconidae is thought to be more closely related to Taracidae than Ischyropsalididae. The internal relationships of Sabaconidae are poorly understood.

== Taxonomy ==
Sabacon contains the following species, per World Catalog of Opiliones. Of the 59 described species (as of 2023), two are further subdivided into subspecies.

- Sabacon aigoual Martens, 2015 (France)
- Sabacon akiyoshiensis Suzuki, 1963 (Japan)
- Sabacon altomontanus Martens, 1983 (France)
- Sabacon astoriensis Shear, 1975 (USA: Oregon)
- Sabacon beatae Martens, 2015 (Nepal)
- Sabacon beishanensis Martens, 2015 (China)
- Sabacon briggsi Shear, 1975 (USA: California)
- Sabacon bryantii (Banks, 1898) (USA: Alaska)
- Sabacon cavicolens (Packard, 1884) (USA, Canada) [including Sabacon jonesi]
- Sabacon chomolongmae Martens, 1972 (Nepal)
- † Sabacon claviger (Menge, 1854) [including † Sabacon bachofeni Roewer, 1939 (Russia in Baltic amber)].
- Sabacon crassipalpis (L. Koch, 1879) (Russia)
- Sabacon dentipalpis Suzuki, 1949 (Japan)
- Sabacon dhaulagiri Martens, 1972 (Nepal)
- Sabacon distinctus Suzuki, 1974 (Japan)
- Sabacon franzi Roewer, 1953 (Spain)
- Sabacon gonggashan Tsurusaki & Song, 1993 (China: Sichuan)
- Sabacon hinkukhola Martens, 2015 (Nepal)
- Sabacon imamurai Suzuki, 1964 (Japan)
- Sabacon iriei Suzuki, 1974 (Japan)
- Sabacon ishizuchi Suzuki, 1974 (Japan)
- Sabacon jaegeri Martens, 2015 (China: Sichuan)
- Sabacon jiriensis Martens, 1972 (Nepal)
- Sabacon kangding Martens, 2015 (Nepal)
- Sabacon maipokhari Martens, 2015 (Nepal)
- Sabacon makinoi Suzuki, 1949
  - Sabacon makinoi makinoi Suzuki, 1949 (Japan, South Korea)
  - Sabacon makinoi sugimotoi Suzuki & Tsurusaki, 1983 (Japan)
- Sabacon martensi Tsurusaki & Song, 1993 (China: Sichuan)
- Sabacon minshanensis Martens, 2015 (China: Sichuan)
- Sabacon minutissimus Martens, 2015 (Nepal)
- Sabacon mitchelli Crosby & Bishop, 1924 (USA: North Carolina)
- Sabacon monacanthus Zhao, Martens & Zhang, 2018 (China: Yunnan)
- Sabacon multiserratus Martens, 2015 (China: Shaanxi)
- Sabacon nishikawai Martens, 2015 (Nepal, India)
- Sabacon occidentalis (Banks, 1894) (Canada, USA: Pacific Northwest)
- Sabacon okadai Suzuki, 1941 (China: Liaoning)
- Sabacon palpogranulatus Martens, 1972 (Nepal)
- Sabacon paradoxus Simon, 1879 (Pyrenees) (France, Spain, Andorra: i.e. Pyrenees)
- Sabacon pasonianus Luque, 1991 (Spain)
- Sabacon pauperoserratus Martens, 2015 (China: Shaanxi)
- Sabacon petarberoni Martens, 2015 (Nepal)
- Sabacon picosantrum Martens, 1983 (Spain)
- Sabacon pygmaeus Miyosi, 1942 (Japan)
- Sabacon relictoides Martens, 2015 (Nepal)
- Sabacon relictus Marten, 1972 (Nepal)
- Sabacon rossopacificus Martens, 2015 (Russia)
- Sabacon rupinala Martens, 2015 (Nepal)
- Sabacon satoikioi Miyosi, 1942 (Japan)
- Sabacon schawalleri Martens, 2015 (Nepal)
- Sabacon sergeidedicatus Martens, 1989 (Russia: Siberia)
- Sabacon sheari Cokendolpher, 1984 (USA: Oregon)
- Sabacon simbuakhola Martens, 2015 (Nepal)
- Sabacon simoni Dresco, 1952 (France, Italy)
- Sabacon sineglandula Martens, 2015 (Nepal)
- Sabacon siskiyou Shear, 1975 (USA: California, Oregon)
- Sabacon suzukii Zhao, Martens & Zhang, 2018 (Japan)
- Sabacon thakkolanus Martens, 2015 (Nepal)
- Sabacon unicornis Martens, 1972 (Nepal)
- Sabacon viscayanus Simon, 1881

- Sabacon viscayanus ramblaianus Martens, 1983 (France)
- Sabacon viscayanus viscayanus Simon, 1881 (Spain)

- Sabacon zateevi Trilikauskas & Azarkina, 2021 (Russia)
