= Sidhwan Branch =

The Sidhwan Branch is a branch of the Sirhind Canal that irrigates an area of 4.63 lakh acres in Punjab, India. It is 88.01 km long and has a discharge of 1,751 cusecs. It is a link channel under the Bhakra canals, linking the old inundation canals of Daultwah and Kingwah. The Sidhwan Branch emerges from the Sirhind canal system with a 1,727 cusec capacity. The branch was constructed in 1954 and takes from the Manpur Head to use discharge saved from the area served by Bhakra Canal and the Sirhind Feeder System for the purposes of irrigating the bet (floodplains) along the Sutlej River in Ludhiana, Moga, and Firozpur districts and passes through the city of Ludhiana. The branch was later converted from a non-perennial (from April to October) to a perennial branch. The branch suffers from pollution due to discharge of sullage water from Gill Road near Punjab Agriculture University in Ludhiana.
