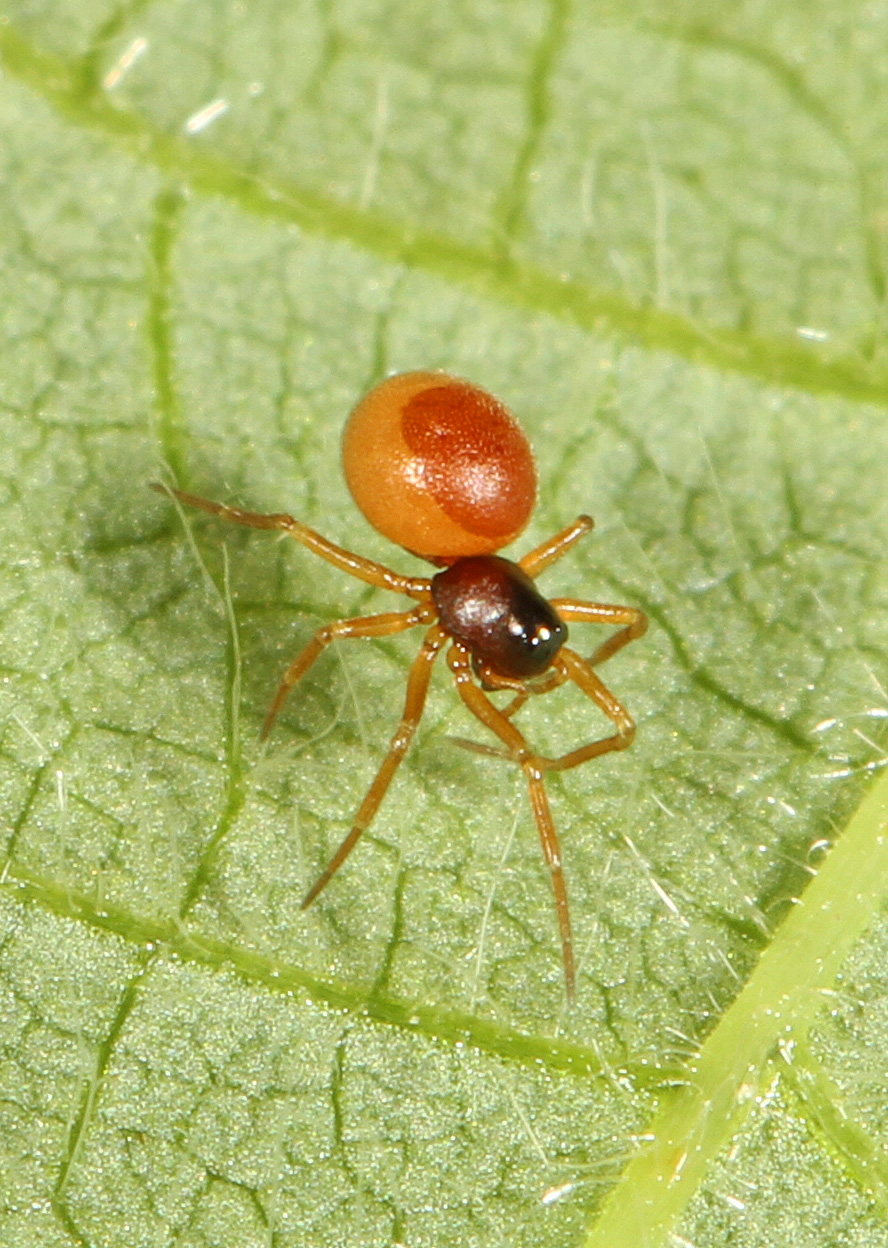
- C. fissiceps

Scientific classification
- Kingdom: Animalia
- Phylum: Arthropoda
- Subphylum: Chelicerata
- Class: Arachnida
- Order: Araneae
- Infraorder: Araneomorphae
- Family: Linyphiidae
- Genus: Ceraticelus; Simon, 1884

Type species
- C. fissiceps (O. Pickard-Cambridge, 1874)

Species
- 34, see text

= Ceraticelus =

Genus of spiders

Ceraticelus is a genus of dwarf spiders that was first described by Eugène Louis Simon in 1884.

== Species ==
As of May 2019 it contains thirty-four species and two subspecies:

- Ceraticelus agathus Chamberlin, 1949 – USA
- Ceraticelus albus (Fox, 1891) – USA
- Ceraticelus alticeps (Fox, 1891) – USA
- Ceraticelus artemisiae Prentice & Redak, 2009 – USA
- Ceraticelus atriceps (O. Pickard-Cambridge, 1874) – USA
- Ceraticelus berthoudi Dondale, 1958 – USA
- Ceraticelus bryantae Kaston, 1945 – USA
- Ceraticelus bulbosus (Emerton, 1882) – North America, Netherlands, Germany, Poland, Finland, Russia (Europe to Far East)
- Ceraticelus carinatus (Emerton, 1911) – USA
- Ceraticelus crassiceps Chamberlin & Ivie, 1939 – USA
- Ceraticelus creolus Chamberlin, 1925 – USA
- Ceraticelus emertoni (O. Pickard-Cambridge, 1874) – USA
- Ceraticelus fastidiosus Crosby & Bishop, 1925 – USA
- Ceraticelus fissiceps (O. Pickard-Cambridge, 1874) (type) – USA, Canada
- Ceraticelus innominabilis Crosby, 1905 – USA (Alaska)
- Ceraticelus laetabilis (O. Pickard-Cambridge, 1874) – USA, Canada
  - Ceraticelus l. pisga Chamberlin, 1949 – USA
- Ceraticelus laetus (O. Pickard-Cambridge, 1874) – USA, Canada
- Ceraticelus laticeps (Emerton, 1894) – USA, Canada
  - Ceraticelus l. bucephalus Chamberlin & Ivie, 1944 – USA
- Ceraticelus limnologicus Crosby & Bishop, 1925 – USA
- Ceraticelus micropalpis (Emerton, 1882) – USA
- Ceraticelus minutus (Emerton, 1882) – USA, Canada
- Ceraticelus nigripes Bryant, 1940 – Cuba
- Ceraticelus orientalis Eskov, 1987 – Russia
- Ceraticelus paludigena Crosby & Bishop, 1925 – USA, Hispaniola
- Ceraticelus paschalis Crosby & Bishop, 1925 – USA
- Ceraticelus phylax Ivie & Barrows, 1935 – USA
- Ceraticelus pygmaeus (Emerton, 1882) – USA
- Ceraticelus rowensis [[Herbert Walter Levi|Levi]] & [[Herbert Walter Levi|Levi]], 1955 – Canada
- Ceraticelus savannus Chamberlin & Ivie, 1944 – USA
- Ceraticelus silus Dondale, 1958 – USA (Alaska)
- Ceraticelus similis (Banks, 1892) – USA
- Ceraticelus subniger Chamberlin, 1949 – USA
- Ceraticelus tibialis (Fox, 1891) – USA
- Ceraticelus tumidus Bryant, 1940 – Cuba

== See also ==
- Blacktailed red sheetweaver (spider with similar coloration)
