= Ceraticelus innominabilis =

Scientific classification
- Domain: Eukaryota
- Kingdom: Animalia
- Phylum: Arthropoda
- Subphylum: Chelicerata
- Class: Arachnida
- Order: Araneae
- Infraorder: Araneomorphae
- Family: Linyphiidae
- Genus: Ceraticelus
- Species: C. innominabilis

Binomial name
- Ceraticelus innominabilis Crosby, 1905

Species of spider

Ceraticelus innominabilis is a spider in the family Linyphiidae. It is found in Alaska.
