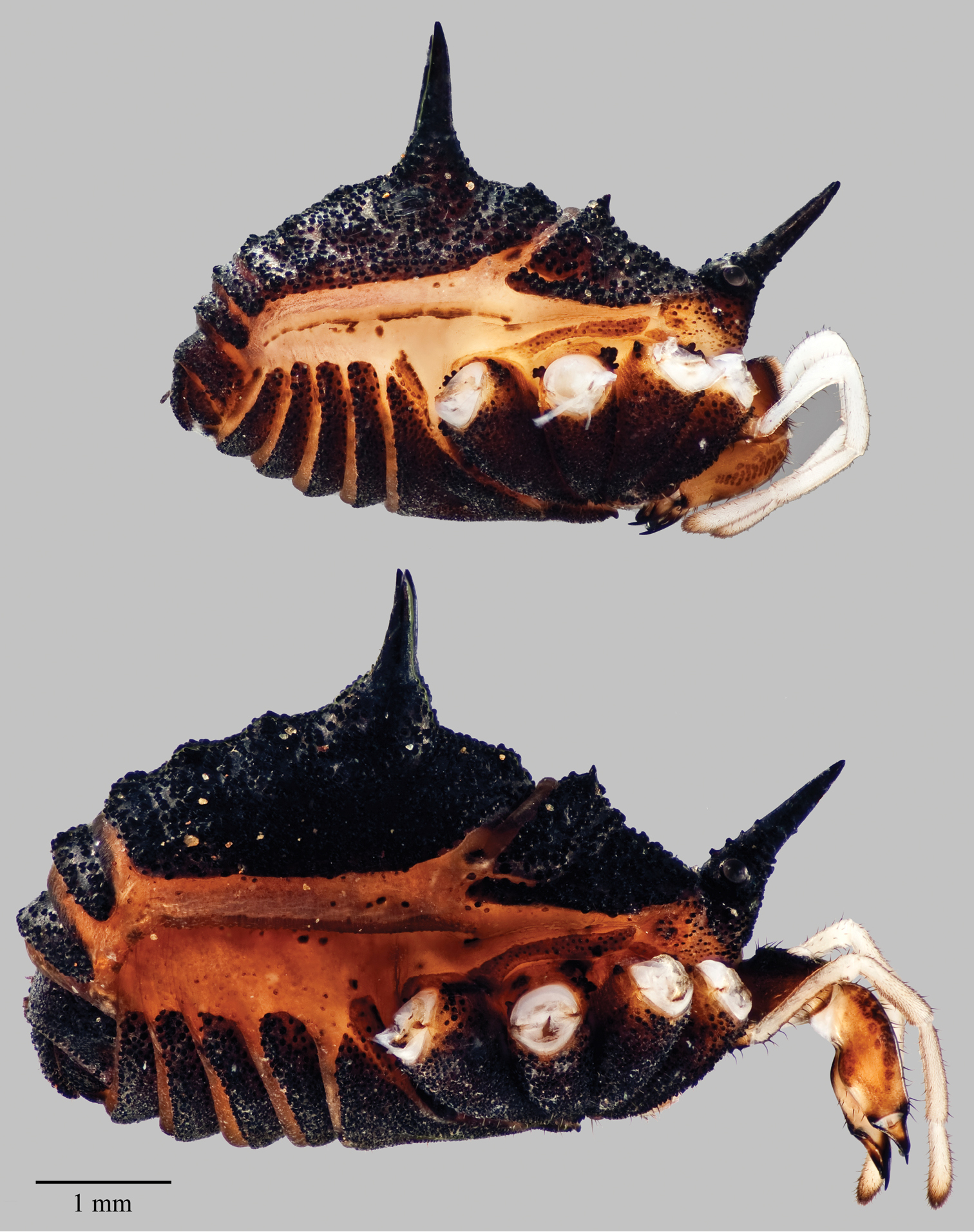
- Acuclavella makah male and female

Scientific classification
- Kingdom: Animalia
- Phylum: Arthropoda
- Subphylum: Chelicerata
- Class: Arachnida
- Order: Opiliones
- Family: Ischyropsalididae
- Genus: Acuclavella
- Species: A. makah

Binomial name
- Acuclavella makah Richart and Hedin, 2013

= Acuclavella makah =

Species of arachnid

Acuclavella makah is a species of harvestman in the family Ischyropsalididae endemic to the Olympic Peninsula of Washington. Despite being most closely related to A. leonardi, there is a deep phylogenetic split between the two species, most likely caused by geographic separation as the other is found in the Cascade Mountains.

== Etymology ==
The genus Acuclavella was named by William Shear in 1986; based on Wiktionary, it would mean something like "sharp little clubs", "acu" being the singular ablative form of the Latin "acus", meaning "needle", and "clavella" being the diminutive form of the Latin "clava", meaning "club." The species name, makah, is in honor of the Makah Nation, which is an exonym given to them by neighboring groups, meaning "generous with food."

== Description ==
While it is distinct from most other Acuclavella species, it is extremely similar to A. leonardi, from which it can be most easily distinguished by genetics and geographic location. The only notable physical differences are certain scutes tending to be on less identifiable mounds and certain spines being thinner at the base in A. makah. It can be more easily distinguished from the other species by having paramedian tubercles only on area 2, sometimes having false leg articulations on the metatarsi of the second legs and single dark prolateral tubercles on the palpal patellae, and having distinctive, contrasting light-colored ends on the ends of sclerotized leg segments, resembling banding at joints.

== Habitat & ecology ==
A. makah is only found in the northwestern Olympic Peninsula in Clallam and Jefferson counties, where it dwells underneath woody debris and moss near perennial headwater streams and seeps in coniferous riparian forest, with a plant community of western hemlock (Tsuga heterophylla), western redcedar (Thuja plicata), red alder (Alnus rubra), salmonberry (Rubus spectabilis), sitka spruce (Picea sitchensis), and western sword fern (Polystichum munitum).

Their crypsis against moist wood is thought to be defensive, with the spines likely serving as an additional mechanical defense. Despite this, one female specimen of A. cosmetoides (CHR2403) was found dead in a Pimoa spider's web.

== Life cycle ==
The members of the genus seem to have an annual, seasonal life cycle. Penultimate subadults and young adults occur in April in May, with adults occurring from May to September. A single specimen of a young life stage was found in mid-October.
