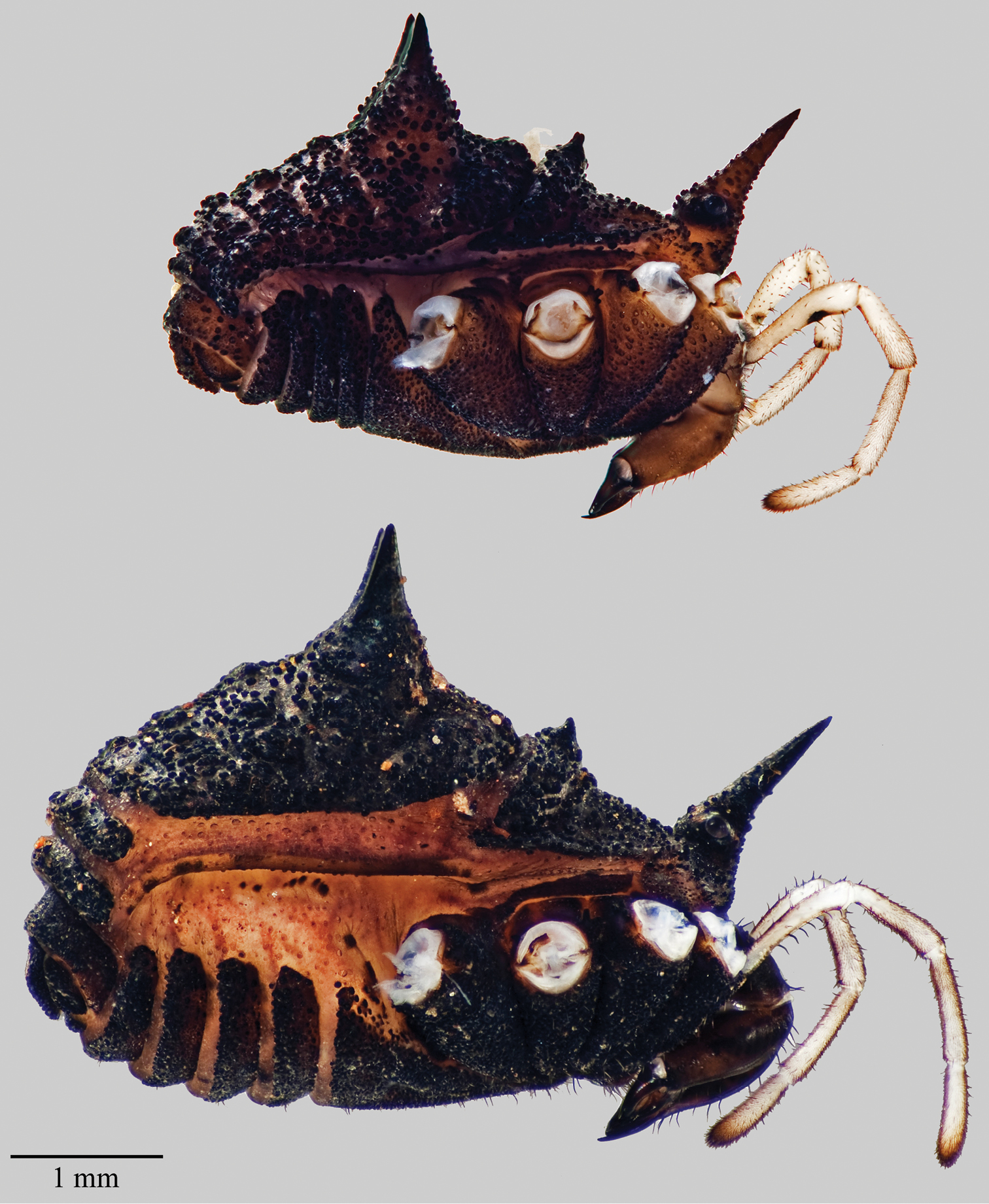
- Specimens of a male (top) and female (bottom) Acuclavella leonardi

Scientific classification
- Kingdom: Animalia
- Phylum: Arthropoda
- Subphylum: Chelicerata
- Class: Arachnida
- Order: Opiliones
- Family: Ischyropsalididae
- Genus: Acuclavella
- Species: A. leonardi

Binomial name
- Acuclavella leonardi Richart and Hedin, 2013

= Acuclavella leonardi =

Species of arachnid

Acuclavella leonardi is a species of harvestman in the family Ischyropsalididae endemic to the Cascade Mountains of Washington. Despite being most closely related to A. makah, forming a monophyletic clade as a sister species, there is a deep phylogenetic split likely caused by geographic separation as the other is found in the Olympic Peninsula.

== Etymology ==
The genus Acuclavella was named by William Shear in 1986; it roughly translates to something like "sharp little clubs", "acu" being the singular ablative form of the Latin "acus", meaning "needle", and "clavella" being the diminutive form of the Latin "clava", meaning "club." The species name, leonardi, is in honor of the naturalist William P. Leonard, who worked on litter-dwelling organisms in the "poor-person's rainforest" of the Pacific Northwest.

== Description ==
While it is distinct from most other Acuclavella species, it is extremely similar to A. makah, from which it can be most easily distinguished by genetics and geographic location. The only notable physical differences are the scutes behind the spines having more distinct raised mounds with warty tubercles and certain spines being wider at the base in A. leonardi. It can be more easily distinguished from other species by having paramedian tubercles only on area 2, sometimes having false leg articulations on the metatarsi of the second legs and single dark prolateral tubercles on the palpal patellae, and having distinctive, contrasting light-colored ends to sclerotized leg segments, resembling banding.

== Habitat & ecology ==
A. leonardi is found in the southern Cascades of Southwestern Washington within the Cowlitz River and Coweeman River watersheds of the counties Skamania, Lewis, and Cowlitz, where it dwells underneath woody debris near perennial headwater streams and seeps in coniferous riparian forest. It's been found below stream-side woody debris at elevations of 130 to 1065 meters (426.509 to 3494.094 feet) alongside Douglas fir (Pseudotsuga menziessi), western hemlock (Tsuga heterophylla), grand fir (Abies grandis), red alder (Alnus rubra), bigleaf maple (Acer macrophyllum), and western redcedar (Thuja plicata).

Their crypsis against moist wood is thought to be defensive, with the spines likely serving as an additional mechanical defense. Despite this, one female specimen of A. cosmetoides was found dead in a Pimoa spider's web.

== Life cycle ==
The members of the genus seem to have a seasonal, annual life cycle. Penultimate subadults and young adults occur in April and May, with adults occurring from May to September. A single specimen of a young life stage was found in mid-October.
