= Souidas =

Scientific classification
- Kingdom: Animalia
- Phylum: Arthropoda
- Subphylum: Chelicerata
- Class: Arachnida
- Order: Araneae
- Infraorder: Araneomorphae
- Family: Linyphiidae
- Genus: Souidas; Crosby & Bishop, 1936
- Species: S. tibialis

Binomial name
- Souidas tibialis (Emerton, 1882)

Genus of spiders

Souidas is a monotypic genus of North American sheet weavers containing the single species, Souidas tibialis. It was first described by American entomologists C. R. Crosby & S. C. Bishop in 1936, and has only been found in the United States.
