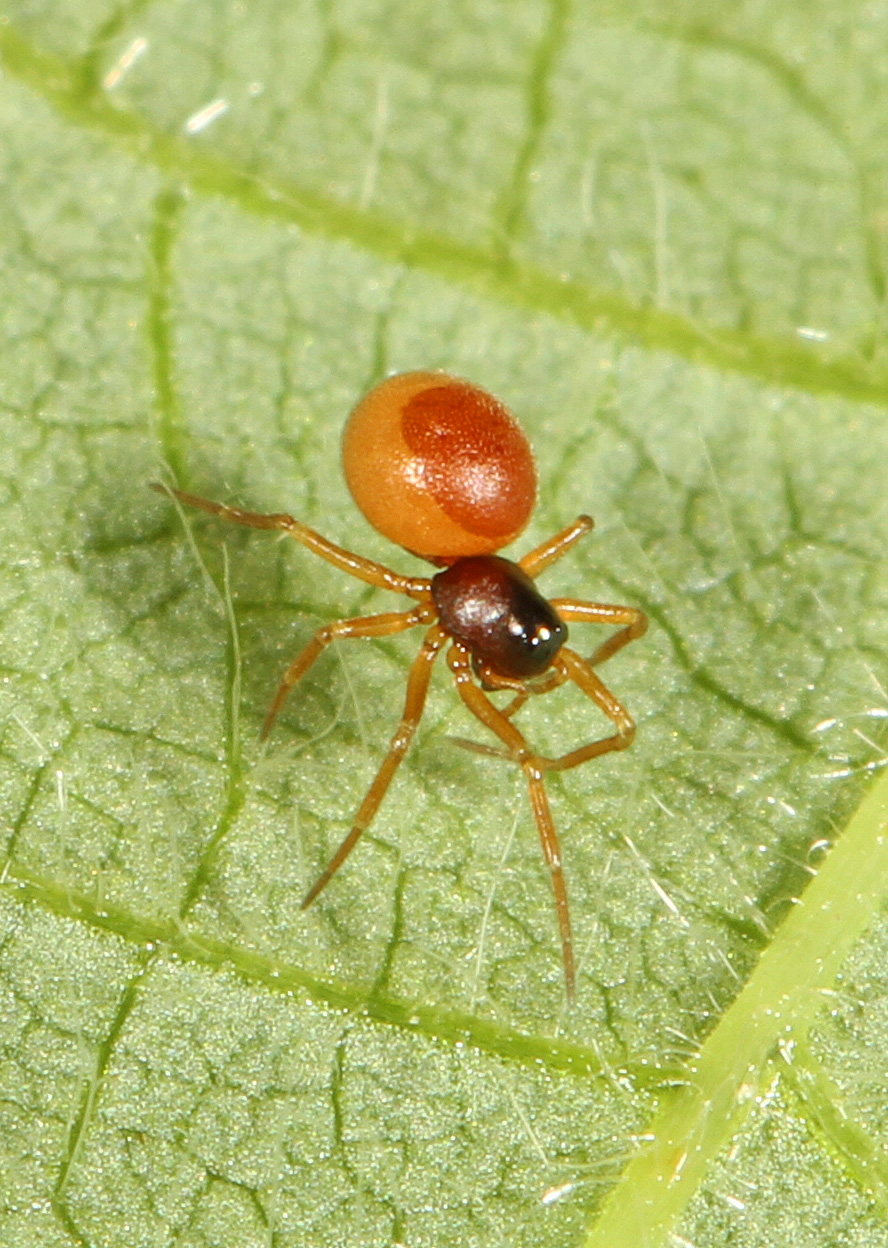

Conservation status
- Secure (NatureServe)

Scientific classification
- Kingdom: Animalia
- Phylum: Arthropoda
- Subphylum: Chelicerata
- Class: Arachnida
- Order: Araneae
- Infraorder: Araneomorphae
- Family: Linyphiidae
- Genus: Ceraticelus
- Species: C. fissiceps

Binomial name
- Ceraticelus fissiceps (O. P.-Cambridge, 1874)

= Ceraticelus fissiceps =

Species of spider

Ceraticelus fissiceps is a species of dwarf spider in the family Linyphiidae. It is found in the United States and Canada.
