= Ceraticelus similis =

Conservation status
- Secure (NatureServe)

Scientific classification
- Kingdom: Animalia
- Phylum: Arthropoda
- Subphylum: Chelicerata
- Class: Arachnida
- Order: Araneae
- Infraorder: Araneomorphae
- Family: Linyphiidae
- Genus: Ceraticelus
- Species: C. similis

Binomial name
- Ceraticelus similis (Banks, 1892)

Species of spider

Ceraticelus similis is a species of dwarf spider in the family Linyphiidae. It is found in the United States.
