= Ceraticelus bulbosus =

Conservation status
- Secure (NatureServe)

Scientific classification
- Kingdom: Animalia
- Phylum: Arthropoda
- Subphylum: Chelicerata
- Class: Arachnida
- Order: Araneae
- Infraorder: Araneomorphae
- Family: Linyphiidae
- Genus: Ceraticelus
- Species: C. bulbosus

Binomial name
- Ceraticelus bulbosus (Emerton, 1882)

Species of spider

Ceraticelus bulbosus is a species of dwarf spider in the family Linyphiidae. It is found in North America, the Netherlands, Germany, Poland, Finland, and a range from Russia (Europe to Far East).
