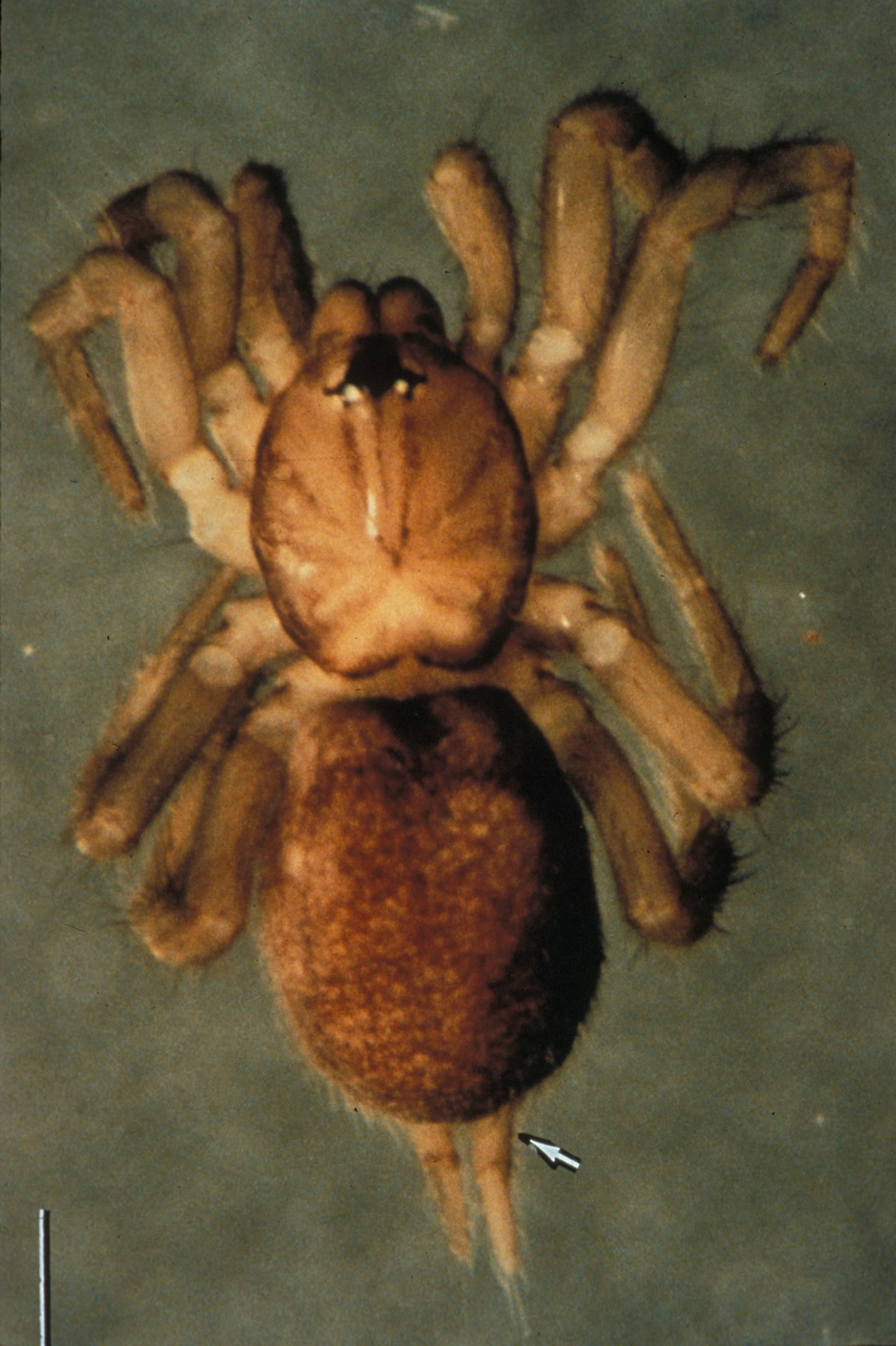

Conservation status
- Imperiled (NatureServe)

Scientific classification
- Domain: Eukaryota
- Kingdom: Animalia
- Phylum: Arthropoda
- Subphylum: Chelicerata
- Class: Arachnida
- Order: Araneae
- Infraorder: Mygalomorphae
- Family: Microhexuridae
- Genus: Microhexura
- Species: M. montivaga

Binomial name
- Microhexura montivaga Crosby & Bishop, 1925

Synonyms
- Microhexura montivagus [sic] Crosby & Bishop, 1925

= Spruce-fir moss spider =

Species of spider

The spruce-fir moss spider (Microhexura montivaga) is an endangered species of spider found at high elevations in the southern Appalachian Mountains. First identified in 1923, it inhabits moss that grows on rocks underneath the forest canopy.

== Description ==
M. montivaga is one of the smallest mygalomorph spiders, with adults measuring only 3 to 4 mm (about 1/8 inch). The coloration varies from light brown to yellow-brown to a darker reddish brown, with no markings on the abdomen. The chelicerae project forward, and one pair of spinnerets is very long. It possesses a second pair of book lungs, which appear as light patches behind the genital furrow.

== Distribution and habitat ==
M. multivaga is known from Fraser fir and red spruce forests on mountain peaks at and above 1,650 m (5,410 ft) in the Southern Appalachian Mountains of North Carolina, Virginia and Tennessee. It has been recorded from Kuwohi and Mount Collins (both very small populations), Mount Le Conte, Mount Mitchell (where probably extirpated), Grandfather Mountain, and Roan Mountain.

The Tennessee population, located in Sevier County, was considered healthy up to 1989, but is now possibly extirpated. On two locations in North Carolina, there was only one spider found each in recent years. Only the population along the Avery/Caldwell County line in North Carolina seems to be relatively stable. This population appears to be restricted to the moss mats on a single rock outcrop and a few surrounding boulders.

The Fraser fir and red spruce, which are Ice Age relics, dominate the forests that grow on these summits. On the damp, cold forest floor, bryophytes like mosses and liverworts are widespread, and the threatened spruce-fir moss spider lives in bryophyte matting that form on rocks and have a very specific combination of moisture and thickness. The resulting thinning of the forest canopy leads to the drying of the moss mats that are essential for the spider's survival, as it requires climates of high and constant humidity. These spiders have survived in temperatures that range between -17.8 °C or 0 °F and 19.8 °C or 67.6 °F within mountainous regions of the Southern Appalachians.

== Biology ==
M. montivaga constructs tube-shaped webs, apparently for shelter, as prey has never been found in them. It probably feeds on springtails that are abundant in moss mats. Scientists know that spiders play a significant role in controlling insect populations as top predators and that the extinction of one species could ripple impact on other spider species and ecosystems. The spruce-fir moss spider, which likely consumes mites and springtails, is the top predator in its microhabitat. M. montivaga can take as long as three years to reach maturity, due to low temperatures and resulting slow metabolism.

== Endangered status ==
The widespread death of Fraser fir trees has destroyed many habitats for M. montivaga, and the spider species was listed as endangered in 1995. Many Fraser firs have died due to infestation with Adelges piceae, the balsam woolly adelgid, an insect pest introduced from Europe. NatureServe considers the species "Imperiled".
