= Ischyropsalis kollari =

Scientific classification
- Kingdom: Animalia
- Phylum: Arthropoda
- Subphylum: Chelicerata
- Class: Arachnida
- Order: Opiliones
- Family: Ischyropsalididae
- Genus: Ischyropsalis
- Species: I. kollari

Binomial name
- Ischyropsalis kollari C.L. Koch, 1839

Species of harvestman

Ischyropsalis kollari is a species of harvestman that belongs to the family Ischyropsalididae. It is native to the Alps in Europe.

This species was discovered in 1939 and is now the type species of the genus.
