= Taracus gertschi =

Scientific classification
- Domain: Eukaryota
- Kingdom: Animalia
- Phylum: Arthropoda
- Subphylum: Chelicerata
- Class: Arachnida
- Order: Opiliones
- Family: Taracidae
- Genus: Taracus
- Species: T. gertschi

Binomial name
- Taracus gertschi C.J. Goodnight & M.L. Goodnight, 1942

Species of harvestman/daddy longlegs

Taracus gertschi is a species of harvestman in the family Taracidae. It is found in North America.
