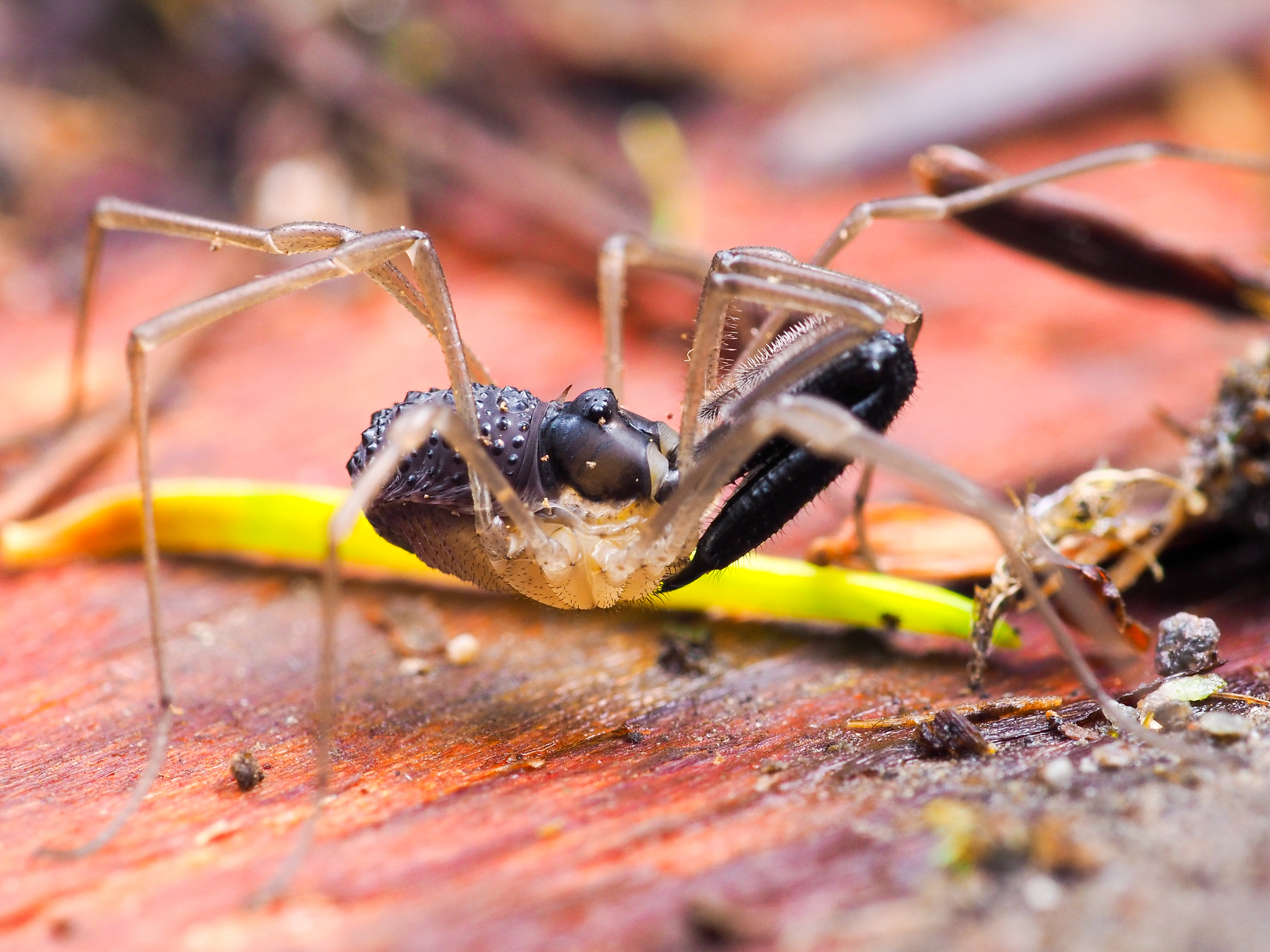

Scientific classification
- Domain: Eukaryota
- Kingdom: Animalia
- Phylum: Arthropoda
- Subphylum: Chelicerata
- Class: Arachnida
- Order: Opiliones
- Family: Taracidae
- Genus: Taracus
- Species: T. pallipes

Binomial name
- Taracus pallipes Banks, 1894

= Taracus pallipes =

Species of arachnid

Taracus pallipes is a species of harvestman in the family Taracidae found in North America.
