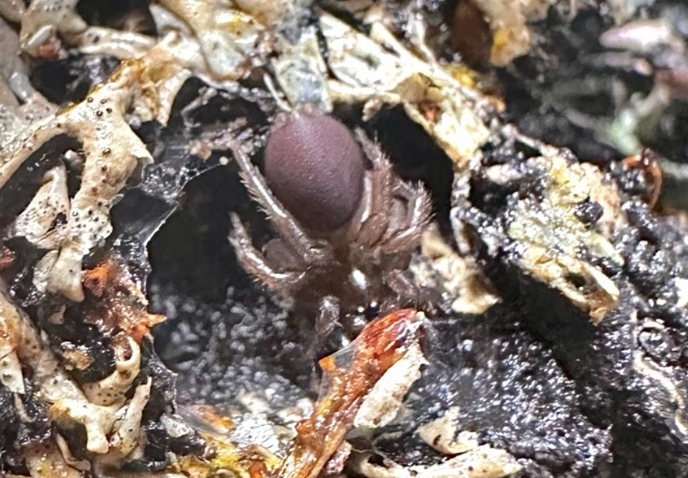
- Spruce-fir moss spider (M. montivaga)
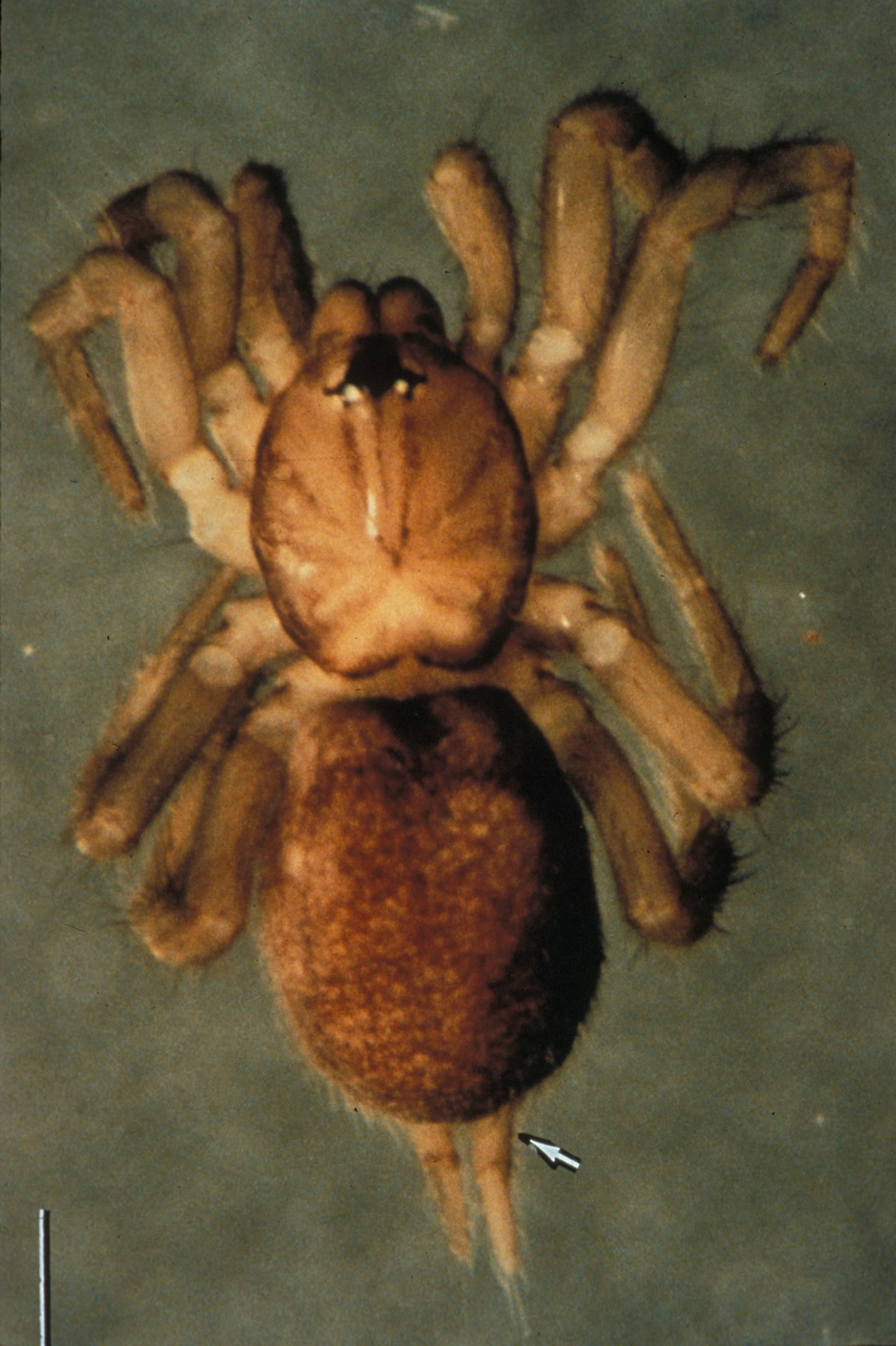
- M. montivaga

Scientific classification
- Kingdom: Animalia
- Phylum: Arthropoda
- Subphylum: Chelicerata
- Class: Arachnida
- Order: Araneae
- Infraorder: Mygalomorphae
- Clade: Avicularioidea
- Family: Microhexuridae
- Genus: Microhexura; Crosby & Bishop, 1925

Type species
- M. montivaga Crosby & Bishop, 1925

Species
- M. idahoana Chamberlin & Ivie, 1945; M. montivaga Crosby & Bishop, 1925
- blue: reported countries (WSC)

= Microhexura =

Pygmy Funnel-web Spiders

Genus of spiders

Microhexura is a genus of tiny North American spiders that was first described by C. R. Crosby & S. C. Bishop in 1925. It is the only genus in the family Microhexuridae, with two described species, both found in the United States: M. idahoana and M. montivaga.

M. montivaga occurs in the higher peaks of the Blue Ridge Mountains of North Carolina and Tennessee. M. idahoana occurs further west, in the Cascades, the Blue Mountains, and the northern Rocky Mountains.

M. montivaga is considered endangered. M. idahoana is widespread in old growth from Mount Rainier southward.

== Species ==
As of January 2026, this genus includes two species:

- Microhexura idahoana Chamberlin & Ivie, 1945 – Canada, United States
- Microhexura montivaga Crosby & Bishop, 1925 – United States
