= Ceraticelus minutus =

Conservation status
- Secure (NatureServe)

Scientific classification
- Kingdom: Animalia
- Phylum: Arthropoda
- Subphylum: Chelicerata
- Class: Arachnida
- Order: Araneae
- Infraorder: Araneomorphae
- Family: Linyphiidae
- Genus: Ceraticelus
- Species: C. minutus

Binomial name
- Ceraticelus minutus (Emerton, 1882)

Species of spider

Ceraticelus minutus is a species of dwarf spider in the family Linyphiidae. It is found in the United States and Canada.
