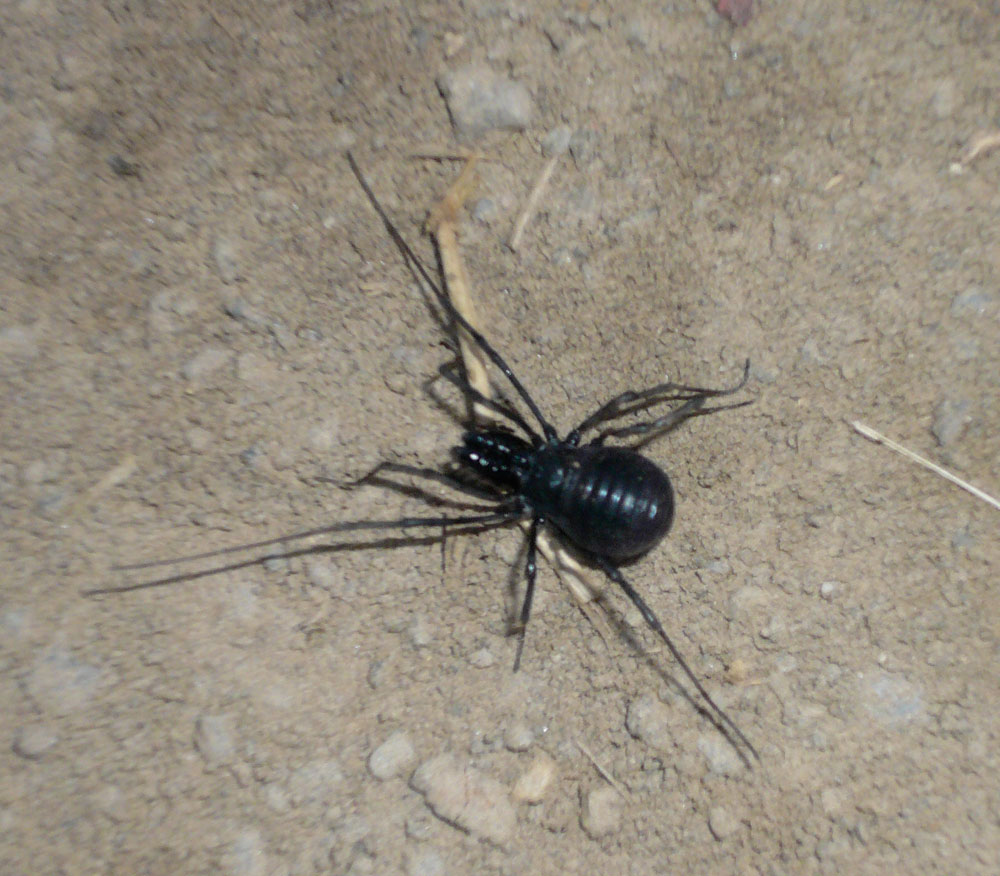

Scientific classification
- Kingdom: Animalia
- Phylum: Arthropoda
- Subphylum: Chelicerata
- Class: Arachnida
- Order: Opiliones
- Family: Ischyropsalididae
- Genus: Ischyropsalis
- Species: I. hellwigi

Binomial name
- Ischyropsalis hellwigi (Panzer, 1794)

Synonyms
- Ischyropsalis crassichelis; Ischyropsalis frankenbergeri; Ischyropsalis franzi; Ischyropsalis herbstii; Ischyropsalis pectinifera; Ischyropsalis plicata; Ischyropsalis taunica; Phalangium helwigii

= Ischyropsalis hellwigi =

Species of harvestman

Ischyropsalis hellwigi is a species of harvestman that belongs to the family Ischyropsalididae. It is native to Europe inhabiting mountainous regions and plains. This species is known to feed on snails using their large sturdy chelicerae used to crack open their shells.

== Taxonomy ==
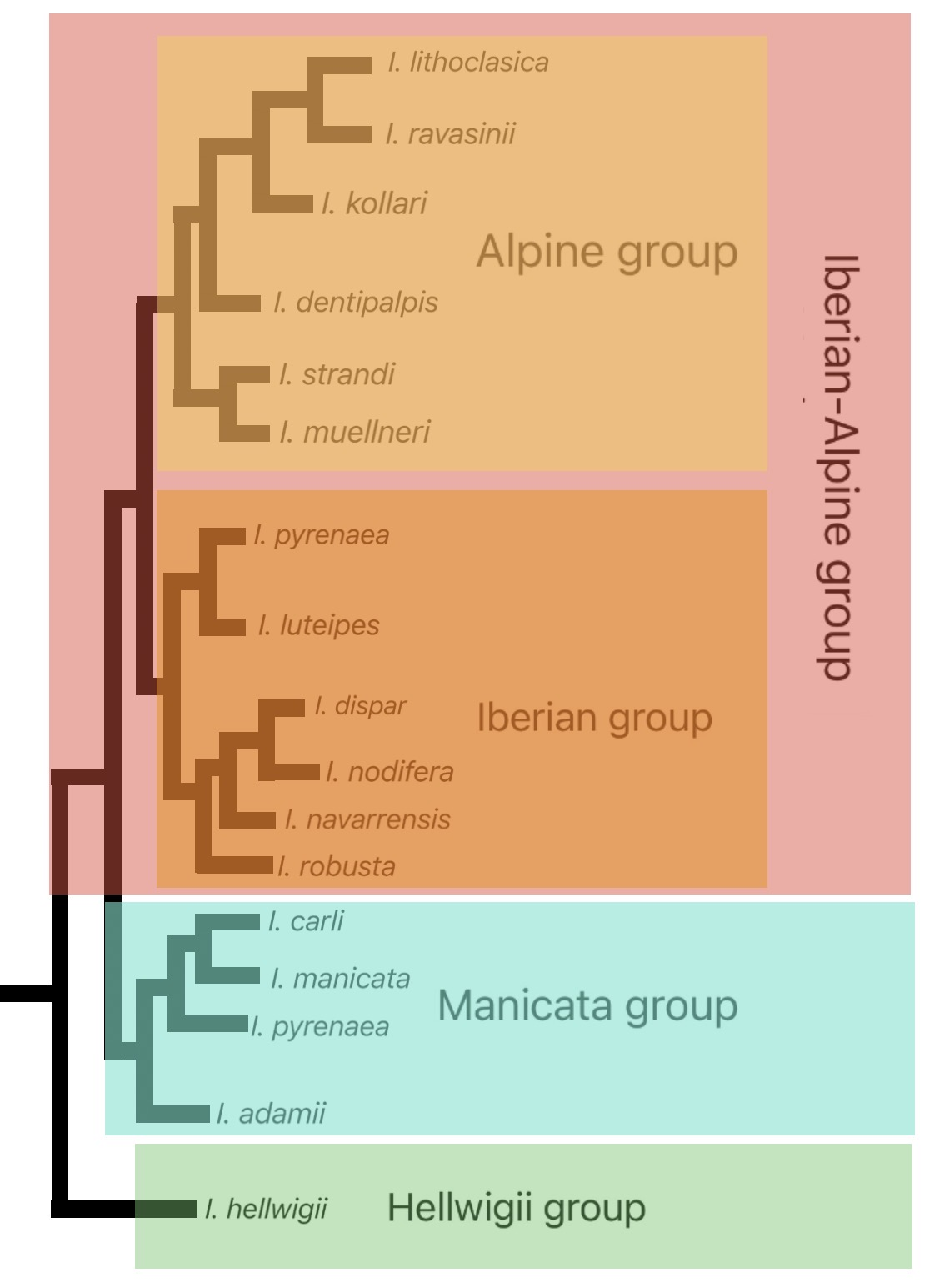
Phylogeny of Ischyropsalis showing major species groups within it. I. hellwigi and its species group is seen at the bottom in green.

Ischyropsalis hellwigi is a member of the family Ischyropsalididae. Molecular data show that the genus is split into several species groups. Within the species group hellwigi, it is the sole member of the group. This species contains two subspecies which are listed below:

- Ischyropsalis hellwigi hellwigi (Panzer, 1794)
- Ischyropsalis hellwigi lucantei Simon, 1878

== Distribution ==
They have a broad and generalized distribution. They are known to inhabit plains, foothills and medium-high mountains. They can also be found in cavities under decaying tree trunks. This species has only been known to inhabit natural forest and have never been reported to be in artificial forests, even in well-maintained and thoroughly managed forests. Their exact range is not known due to their secretive lifestyle. Given the availability of similar habitats I. hellwigii inhabits, this species may be more widespread.

This species is native to central and eastern Europe. In Central Europe, they have been found in the southern Netherlands, southeast Germany (western and central Bohemia), Austria, Czech, western Hungary, Slovenia, Croatia and Bosnia. They are rare in Poland but are known to occurred in the Bystrzyckie and Złote mountain between the villages of Młoty and Spalona and near Lądek Zdró.

== Ecology ==
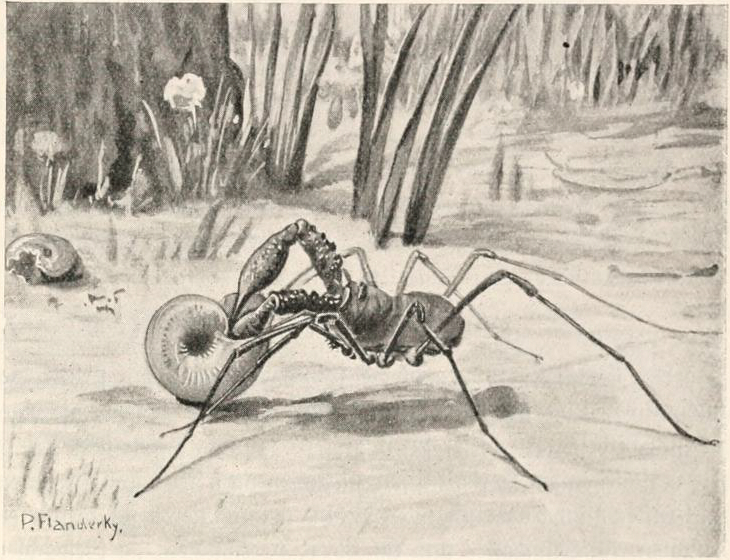
Illustration of Ischyropsalis helwigii hunting snails.

The is species have specialized chelicerae which are much larger and have a sturdier morphology. They use them to actively hunt snails by ripping open their shells and consuming the soft parts inside.
