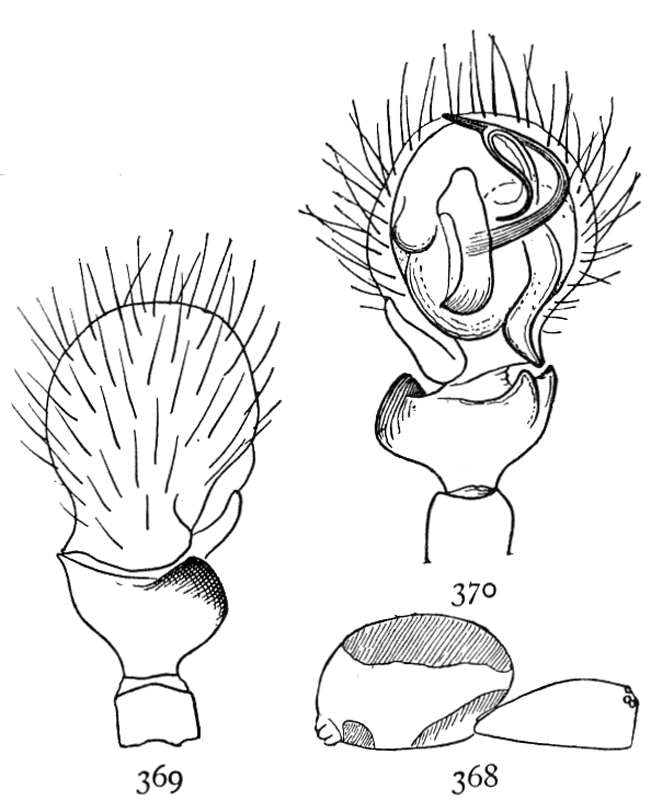
- Ceratinella laetabilis male pedipalp

Conservation status
- Secure (NatureServe)

Scientific classification
- Kingdom: Animalia
- Phylum: Arthropoda
- Subphylum: Chelicerata
- Class: Arachnida
- Order: Araneae
- Infraorder: Araneomorphae
- Family: Linyphiidae
- Genus: Ceraticelus
- Species: C. laetabilis

Binomial name
- Ceraticelus laetabilis (O. P.-Cambridge, 1874)

= Ceraticelus laetabilis =

Species of spider

Ceraticelus laetabilis is a species of dwarf spider in the family Linyphiidae. It is found in the United States and Canada.

== Subspecies ==
These two subspecies belong to the species Ceraticelus laetabilis:

- (Ceraticelus laetabilis laetabilis) (O. P.-Cambridge, 1874)
- Ceraticelus laetabilis pisga Chamberlin, 1949
