= Taracus packardi =

Scientific classification
- Domain: Eukaryota
- Kingdom: Animalia
- Phylum: Arthropoda
- Subphylum: Chelicerata
- Class: Arachnida
- Order: Opiliones
- Family: Taracidae
- Genus: Taracus
- Species: T. packardi

Binomial name
- Taracus packardi Simon, 1879

Species of harvestman/daddy longlegs

Taracus packardi is a species of harvestman in the family Taracidae. It is found in North America.
