= Microhexura idahoana =

Scientific classification
- Kingdom: Animalia
- Phylum: Arthropoda
- Subphylum: Chelicerata
- Class: Arachnida
- Order: Araneae
- Infraorder: Mygalomorphae
- Family: Microhexuridae
- Genus: Microhexura
- Species: M. idahoana

Binomial name
- Microhexura idahoana Chamberlin & Ivie, 1945

Species of spider

Microhexura idahoana is a species of mygalomorph spider in the family Microhexuridae. It is found in the United States.
