= Ceraticelus emertoni =

Scientific classification
- Domain: Eukaryota
- Kingdom: Animalia
- Phylum: Arthropoda
- Subphylum: Chelicerata
- Class: Arachnida
- Order: Araneae
- Infraorder: Araneomorphae
- Family: Linyphiidae
- Genus: Ceraticelus
- Species: C. emertoni

Binomial name
- Ceraticelus emertoni (O. P.-Cambridge, 1874)

Species of arachnid

Ceraticelus emertoni is a species of dwarf spider in the family Linyphiidae. It is found in the United States.
