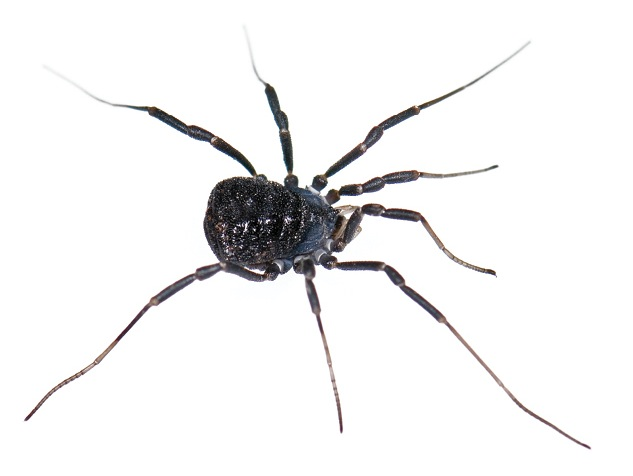
- Acuclavella shoshone

Scientific classification
- Kingdom: Animalia
- Phylum: Arthropoda
- Subphylum: Chelicerata
- Class: Arachnida
- Order: Opiliones
- Suborder: Dyspnoi
- Superfamily: Ischyropsalidoidea; Simon, 1879

Families
- Ischyropsalididae Simon, 1879; Sabaconidae Dresco, 1970; Taracidae Schönhofer, 2013; Also see †Piankhi Dunlop et al., 2012

Diversity
- 3 families, 9 genera

= Ischyropsalidoidea =

Ischyropsalidoidea Temporal range: Palaeogene–present

Family of harvestmen/daddy longlegs

Ischyropsalidoidea is a superfamily of harvestmen with 9 genera (1 extinct), found in Europe and North America (as of 2023).

== Description ==
The superfamily Ischyropsalidoidea was described by Eugene Simon, with the type genus as Ischyropsalis C.L. Koch, 1839 by original implicit etymological designation.

== Taxonomy ==
Ischyropsalidoidea contains the following families, per World Catalog of Opiliones. Of the 9 genera (as of 2023), 1 of those is extinct and remains of uncertain phylogenetic affinity within the Superfamily. The scheme below reflects Schönhofer (2013) plus subsequent amendments such as by Shear & Warfel (2016).

- Ischyropsalididae Simon, 1879
- Sabaconidae Dresco, 1970
- Taracidae Schönhofer, 2013

Plus †Piankhi Dunlop et al., 2012 as "Ischyropsalididae incertae sedis"
