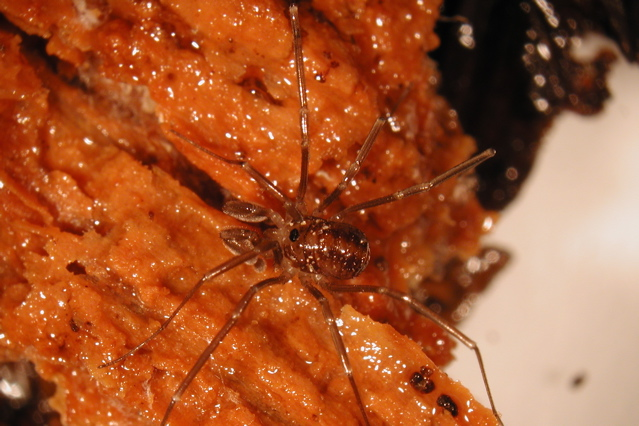

Scientific classification
- Domain: Eukaryota
- Kingdom: Animalia
- Phylum: Arthropoda
- Subphylum: Chelicerata
- Class: Arachnida
- Order: Opiliones
- Family: Sabaconidae
- Genus: Sabacon
- Species: S. cavicolens

Binomial name
- Sabacon cavicolens (Packard, 1884)

Synonyms
- Phlegmacera cavicolens

= Sabacon cavicolens =

Species of harvestman/daddy longlegs

Sabacon cavicolens is a species of harvestman.

== Description ==
Males are a bit longer than 2 mm, females 5 mm.

== Distribution ==
It was originally described from Bat Cave, Carter County, Kentucky and New Hampshire, and a year later found under rotten logs in a deep gorge at Ithaca, New York.

S. cavicolens is distributed over the eastern part of North America, south in the mountains of North Carolina. It is very closely related to S. paradoxum and other European species, but quite different from the other Sabacon species of the eastern US, the smaller S. mitchelli.

== Habitat ==
Most specimens will be found under wet rotting logs of conifer forests, or clinging to the underside of stones. They seem not to walk about during the day, and generally move rather sluggishly. Adult specimens are found at the earliest in mid-autumn, and even later at higher elevations. As they depend on high humidity, it is difficult to transport them alive for further study.
