= Cyrus R. Crosby =

American entomologist

Cyrus Richard Crosby (1879–1937) was an entomologist and arachnologist who taught at Cornell University. Along with Sherman C. Bishop he gave the scientific name to the Spruce-fir moss spider. Crosbycus, a genus of harvestmen in the family Ceratolasmatidae is also named for him.
