= Crosbycus =

Scientific classification
- Domain: Eukaryota
- Kingdom: Animalia
- Phylum: Arthropoda
- Subphylum: Chelicerata
- Class: Arachnida
- Order: Opiliones
- Family: Taracidae
- Genus: Crosbycus; Roewer, 1914
- Species: C. dasycnemus

Binomial name
- Crosbycus dasycnemus (Crosby, 1911)

Species of harvestman/daddy longlegs

Crosbycus is a potentially monotypic genus of harvestmen in the family Taracidae, with one species (Crosbycus dasycnemus) found in North America as of 2023, per the World Catalog of Opiliones.

== Etymology ==
The genus Crosbycus is named after the arachnologist Cyrus Richard Crosby (1879–1937). Gender masculine.

== Taxonomy ==
The genus Crosbycus securely contains one species C. dasycnemus, although historically several other species have been proposed to belong to the genus. These include C. goodnighti Roewer, 1951, C. pentelicus Roewer, 1951 and C. speluncarum Roewer, 1951. C. goodnighti Roewer, 1951 was indicated as species inquirenda by Cokendolpher & Lee 1993, and arguably "should be deleted from North American faunal lists" (per Shear, 2008). For other species from Eurasia, the affinies are even less certain, notably C. pentelicus was considered a junior subjective synonym of Nemastoma thessalum Simon, 1885 by Rambla (1968). Another, C. speluncarum Roewer, 1951, might be best considered nomen dubium (after Schönhofer 2013).
