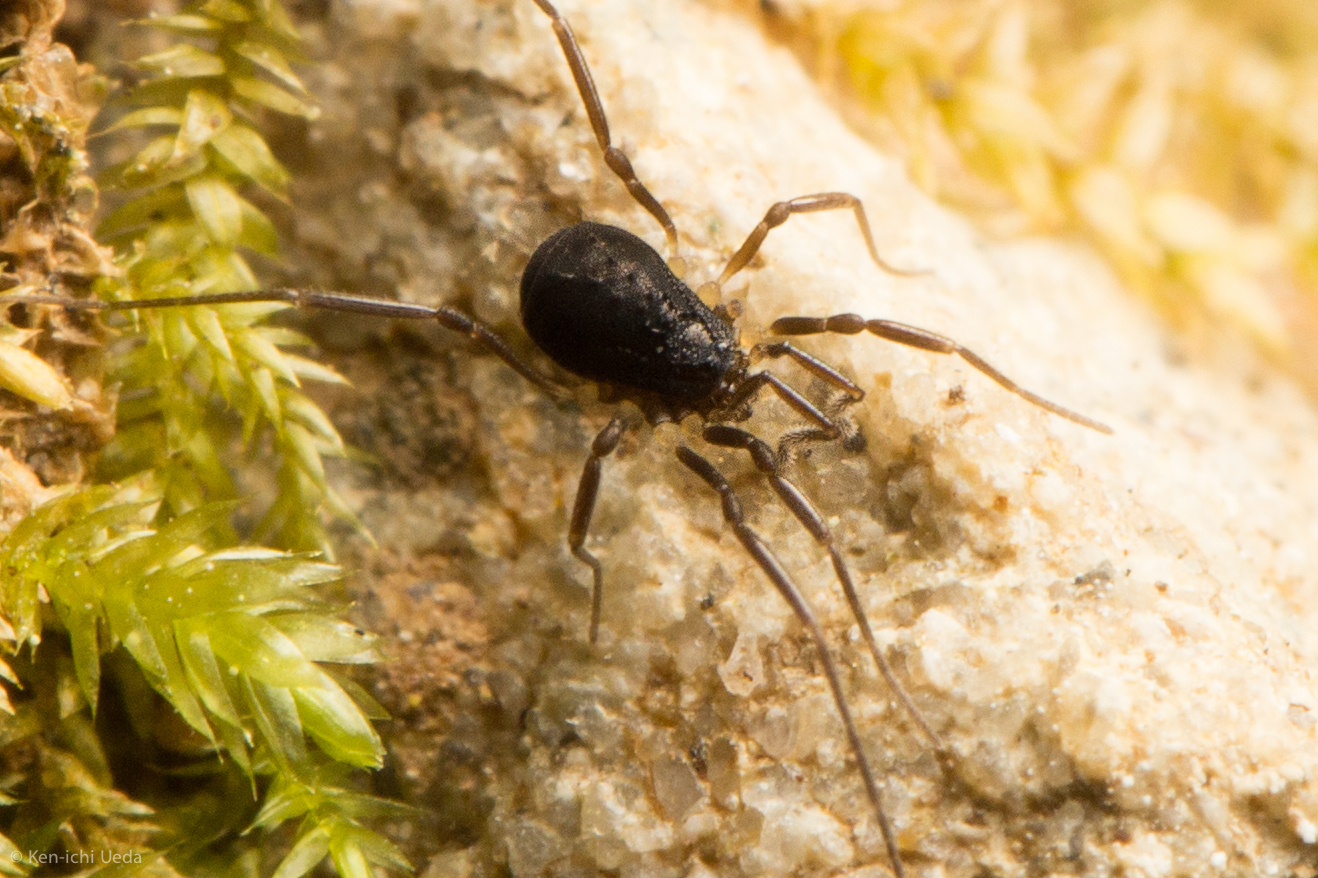

Scientific classification
- Domain: Eukaryota
- Kingdom: Animalia
- Phylum: Arthropoda
- Subphylum: Chelicerata
- Class: Arachnida
- Order: Opiliones
- Family: Taracidae
- Genus: Hesperonemastoma
- Species: H. modestum

Binomial name
- Hesperonemastoma modestum (Banks, 1894)

= Hesperonemastoma modestum =

Species of harvestman/daddy longlegs

Hesperonemastoma modestum is a species of harvestman in the family Taracidae. It is found in North America.
