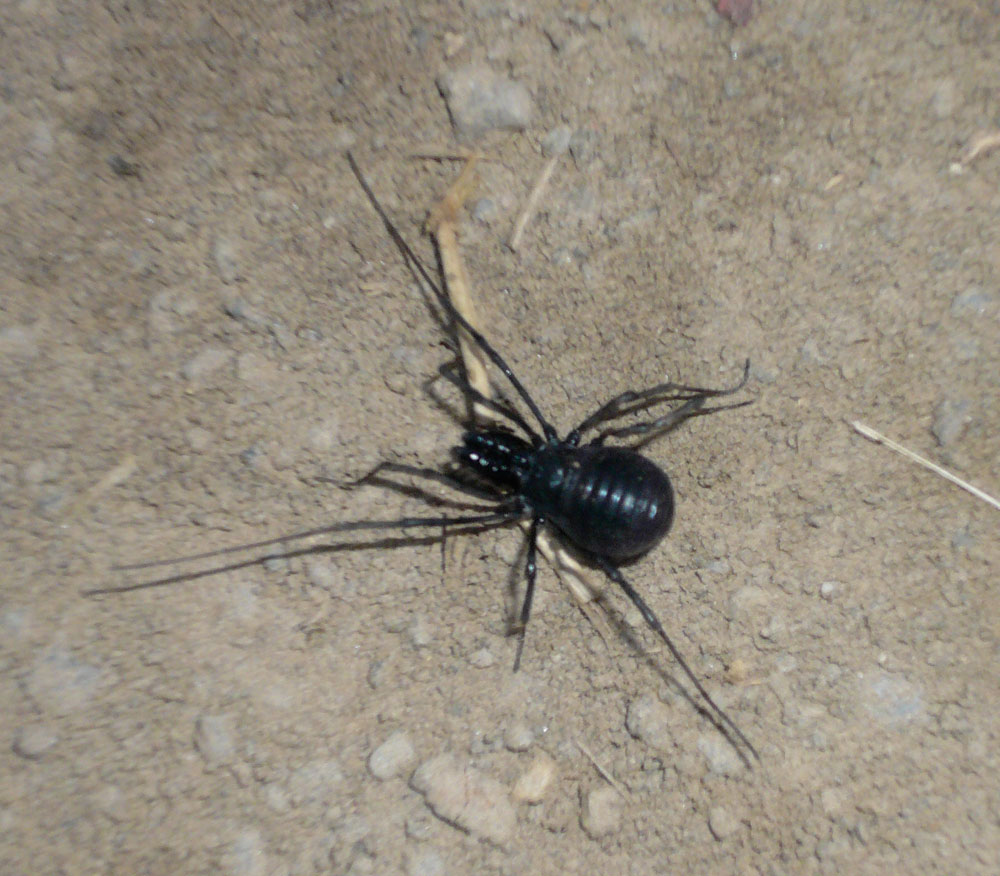
- Ischyropsalis hellwigi

Scientific classification
- Kingdom: Animalia
- Phylum: Arthropoda
- Subphylum: Chelicerata
- Class: Arachnida
- Order: Opiliones
- Superfamily: Ischyropsalidoidea
- Family: Ischyropsalididae
- Subfamily: Ischyropsalidinae
- Genus: Ischyropsalis; C.L. Koch, 1839

Type species
- Ischyropsalis kollari C.L. Koch, 1839

Species
- See text

Diversity
- 24 species

= Ischyropsalis =

Genus of harvestmen/daddy longlegs

Ischyropsalis is a genus of harvestmen that belongs to the family Ischyropsalididae. They are found in the mountainous regions of Europe such as the Alps and the Carpathian mountains. Ischyropsalis is one of the most charismatic genus of harvestman with relatively large body sizes and massively enlarged chelicerae which can be twice the length of the body. Members of this genus are often understudied because they are often rare and inhabit difficult to access habitats such as mountains or sometimes caves.

The genus was first described in 1839 by C.L. Koch, a German entomologist and arachnologist, with the type species being Ischyropsalis kollari. Then over time, dozens of species, many described by Rover, were described creating a confusing and chaotic taxonomy with many having unutilizable descriptions. However Martens in 1969 cleared much of the confusion by reducing the dozens of species into only 15. Now this genus contains around 24 described species. Charles Piochard de La Brûlerie, an entomologist, discovered the first strictly cave-dwelling species, I. dispar, in Albia Cave in Burgos of northern Spain.

== Etymology ==
The genus is feminine. The genus name is a combination of Ancient Greek ischyros "strong" and psalis "shears", referring to the greatly enlarged chelicerae.

== Distribution ==
Members of this genus are restricted to narrow ranges across Europe with many species found in mountains such as the Pyrenees, Alps, Carpathians, and Dinaric Mountains. They reach into the Netherlands, northwestern Germany and Poland in the north and to Southern Italy (i.e. Calabria) in the south. A find from Sardinia is considered doubtful.

Species that inhabits caves generally have very very narrow distributions.

== Description ==
Members of this genus are relatively large for harvestman ranging in body length from about 4 to 8.5 mm. They have greatly enlarged chelicerae which can be almost twice as long as the body. Their elongated chelicerae likely allow them to hunt better like in the case of I. hellwigii which specializes in snails. While they share this feature with members of the family Nipponopsalididae, this is a case of convergent evolution. They have moderately long legs. Their pedipalps are elongated and rather slender.

== Ecology ==
Many members of this genus inhabit cave habitats (troglobitic) with some even being obligate cave-dwellers. There are currently six cave-dwelling species: I. cantabrica, I. magdalenae, I. navarrensis, I. gigantea, I. espagnoli and I. noltei.

== Taxonomy ==
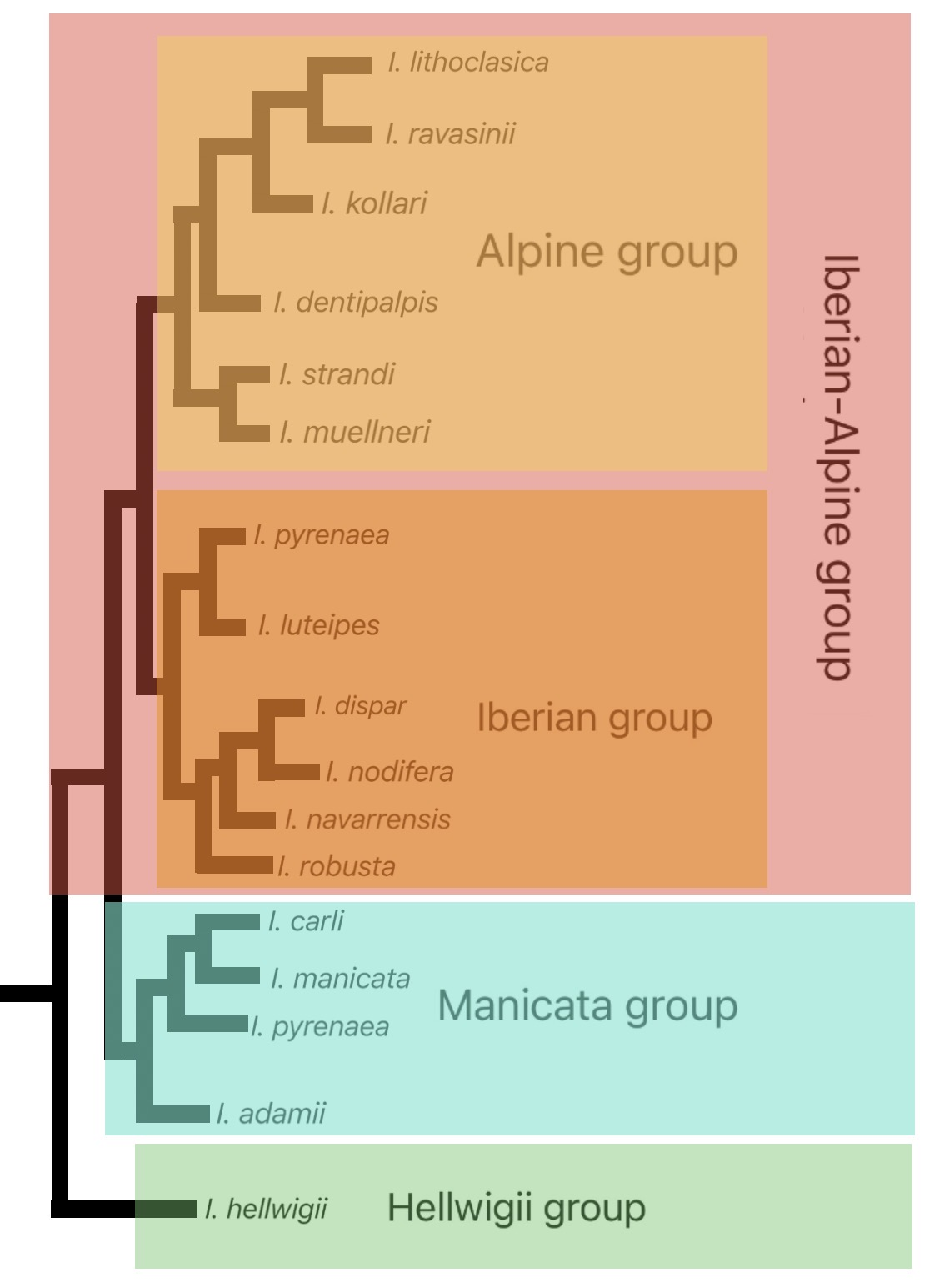
Phylogeny of Ischyropsalis showing the major groups within it. Phylogeny does not include all 35 described species.

Ischyropsalis is a member of the harvestman family Ischyropsalididae which contains 3 genera and some 35 described species. This genus belongs to the subfamily Ischyropsalidinae which it is the sole member of making it monotypic.

Within the genus, molecular data shows that it can be divided into several species groups. First to split is the Hellwigii group containing only I. hellwigii. The next split is the Manicata group which contains many more species such as I. adamii, I. pyrenaea, I. carlii and I. maicata. The last group is the Iberian-Alpine group which can be further divided into two clades: the Iberian clade and the Alpine clade. The Iberian clade is then further split into the Cantabrian clade which contains I. robusta, I. nodifera, I. diaper, I. magdalenae and I. navarrensis and the Pyrenean clade which contains members like I. luteipes and I. pyrenaea. Lastly the Alpine clade contains species such as I. strandi. This clade also be subdivided into the Odontopalpa clade which contains the type species I. kollari, I. lithiclasica and etc.

=== Species ===
These 24 species belong to the genus Ischyropsalis:

- Ischyropsalis adamii Canestrini, 1873
- Ischyropsalis alpinula Martens, 1978
- Ischyropsalis cantabrica Luque & Labrada, 2012
- Ischyropsalis carli Lessert, 1905
- Ischyropsalis dentipalpis Canestrini, 1872
- Ischyropsalis dispar Simon, 1872
- Ischyropsalis gigantea Dresco, 1968
- Ischyropsalis hadzii Roewer, 1950
- Ischyropsalis hellwigi (Panzer, 1794)
- Ischyropsalis hispanica Roewer, 1953
- Ischyropsalis kollari C.L.Koch, 1839
- Ischyropsalis lithoclasica Schönhofer & Martens, 2010
- Ischyropsalis luteipes Simon, 1872
- Ischyropsalis magdalenae Simon, 1881
- Ischyropsalis manicata C.L.Koch, 1865
- Ischyropsalis muellneri Hamann, 1898
- Ischyropsalis navarrensis Roewer, 1950
- Ischyropsalis nodifera Simon, 1879
- Ischyropsalis petiginosa Simon, 1913
- Ischyropsalis pyrenaea Simon, 1872
- Ischyropsalis ravasinii Hadzi, 1942
- Ischyropsalis robusta Simon, 1872
- Ischyropsalis redtenbacheri Doleschall, 1852
- Ischyropsalis strandi Kratochvil, 1936

The following may be valid since 2023:

- Ischyropsalis aguerana Luque & Labrada, 2023
- Ischyropsalis impressa Luque & Labrada, 2023

and as valid (restored?):

- Ischyropsalis noltei Dresco, 1972

=== Taxonomic synonyms ===
The following are a selection of proposed synonyms, hence no longer valid.

- I. alfkeni Roewer, 1950, synonym of I. muellneri
- I. amseli Roewer, 1950, synonym of I. adamii
- I. archeri Roewer, 1950, synonym of I. dispar
- I. asturica Roewer, 1950, synonym of I. nodifera
- I. austriaca Roewer, 1950, synonym of I. manicata
- I. balcanica Roewer, 1950, synonym of I. manicata
- I. bosnica Roewer, 1914, synonym of I. kollari
- I. caporiaccoi Roewer, 1950, synonym of I. luteipes
- I. corcyraea Roewer, 1914, synonym of I. muellneri
- I. corsica Roewer, 1950, synonym of I. nodifera
- I. dacica Roewer, 1916, synonym of I. manicata
- I. danubia Roewer, 1950, synonym of I. kollari
- I. franzi Roewer, 1950, synonym of I. hellwigii
- I. goodnighti Roewer, 1950, synonym of I. dispar
- I. helvetica Roewer, 1916, synonym of I. dentipalpis, I. manicata
- I. janetscheki Roewer, 1950, synonym of I. nodifera
- I. kastneri Roewer, 1950, synonym of I. manicata
- I. knirschi Roewer, 1950, synonym of I. strandi
- I. kratochvili Roewer, 1950, synonym of I. adamii
- I. lusitanica Roewer, 1923, synonym of I. robusta
- I. moreana Roewer, 1950, synonym of I. nodifera, I. pyrenaea
- I. nicaea Roewer, 1950, synonym of I. navarrensis
- I. nivalis Roewer, 1950, synonym of I. kollari
- I. noltei Dresco, 1972, synonym of I. dispar
- I. pentelica Roewer, 1950, synonym of I. carli
- I. pestae Roewer, 1950, synonym of I. luteipes
- I. plicata Roewer, 1923, synonym of I. hellwigii
- I. reimoseri Roewer, 1950, synonym of I. kollari
- I. segregata Roewer, 1950, synonym of I. kollari
- I. spinichelis Roewer, 1950, synonym of I. kollari
- I. strasseri Roewer, 1950, synonym of I. kollari
- I. styriaca Roewer, 1950, synonym of I. kollari
- I. turki Roewer, 1950, synonym of I. navarrensis

According to L. Labrada and C. Prieto in Schönhofer (2013), "Establishment of the present-day taxonomy and validating species-specific characters in Ischyropsalis have been mainly facilitated by the thorough revision of Martens (1969). Having been unable to borrow many types from the Iberian Peninsula, part of his work remained hypothetical for that local fauna, which was later corrected by Dresco (e.g. 1970, 1972), Luque (1991, 1992) and Prieto (1990a, 1990b). Of the 42 species described or emended by Roewer (1914, 1916, 1923, 1950, 1953a) only two remain valid."
