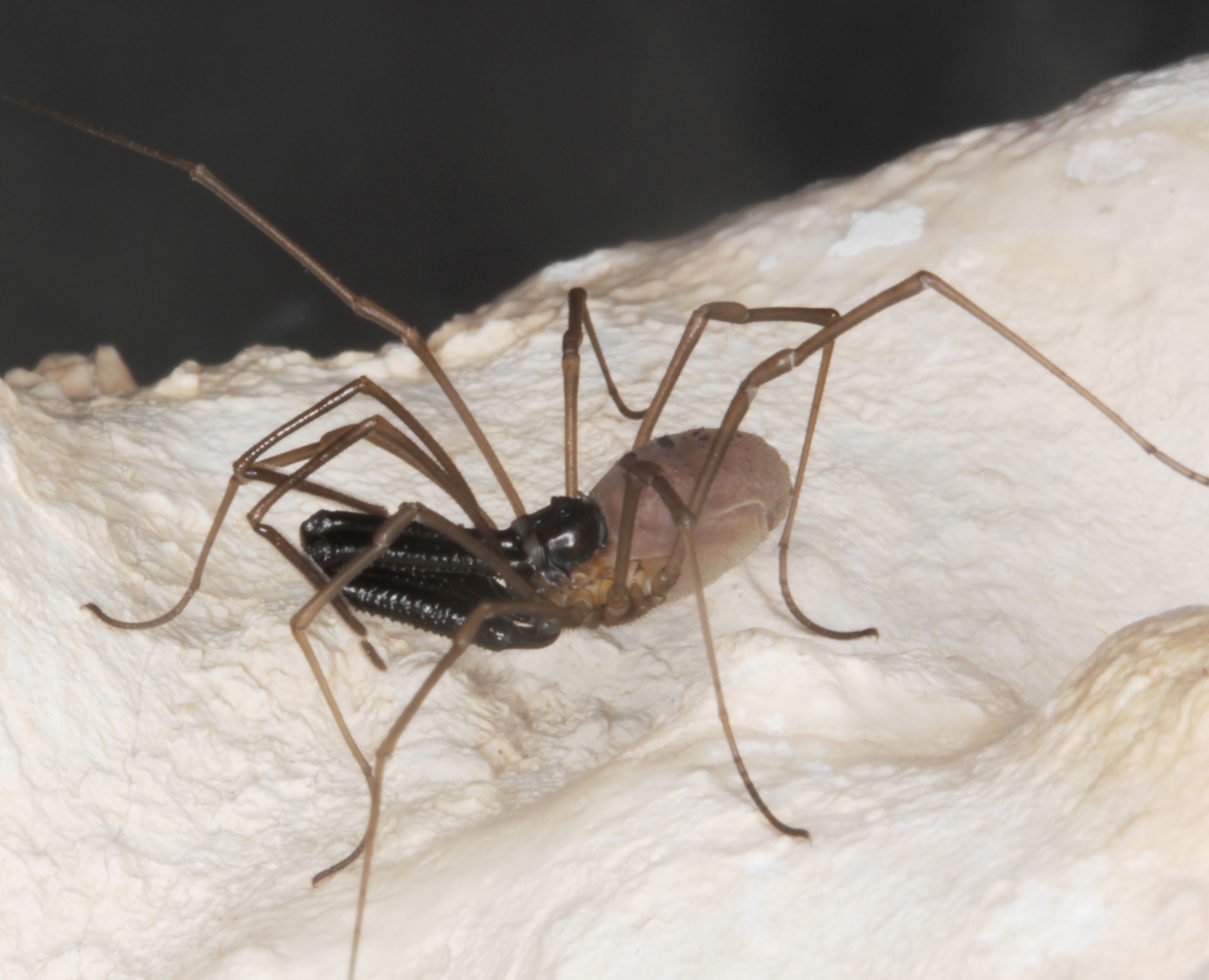
- Taracus silvestrii

Scientific classification
- Kingdom: Animalia
- Phylum: Arthropoda
- Subphylum: Chelicerata
- Class: Arachnida
- Order: Opiliones
- Superfamily: Ischyropsalidoidea
- Family: Taracidae; Schönhofer, 2013

= Taracidae =

Family of harvestmen/daddy longlegs

Taracidae is a family of harvestmen in the order Opiliones. There are 4 genera and 23 described species in Taracidae.

== Taxonomy ==
The Family Taracidae contains the following 23 species (as of 2023), per World Catalog of Opiliones From recent overview, and further studies, the scheme below is achieved, excluding two additional dubious species named by Roewer (1951) where the identity of his described material is unclear. The genera Crosbycus and Hesperonemastoma are not considered to belong to the family by some, although as a new family has not yet been erected for those genera they are included here.

- Crosbycus Roewer, 1914
  - Crosbycus dasycnemus (Crosby, 1911) (but also see the dubious Crosbycus goodnighti Roewer, 1951 and Crosbycus speluncarum Roewer, 1951)
- Hesperonemastoma Gruber, 1970
  - Hesperonemastoma kepharti (Crosby & Bishop, 1924)
  - Hesperonemastoma modestum (Banks, 1894)
  - Hesperonemastoma packardi (Roewer, 1914)
  - Hesperonemastoma pallidimaculosum (Goodnight & Goodnight, 1945)
  - Hesperonemastoma smilax Shear, 2010
- Oskoron Shear, 2016
  - Oskoron brevichelis Shear, 2016
  - Oskoron crawfordi Shear, 2016
  - Oskoron spinosus (Banks, 1894)
- Taracus Simon, 1879 (14 species, including):
  - Taracus gertschi Goodnight & Goodnight, 1942
  - Taracus marchingtoni Shear, 2016
  - Taracus packardi Simon, 1879
  - Taracus pallipes Banks, 1894
