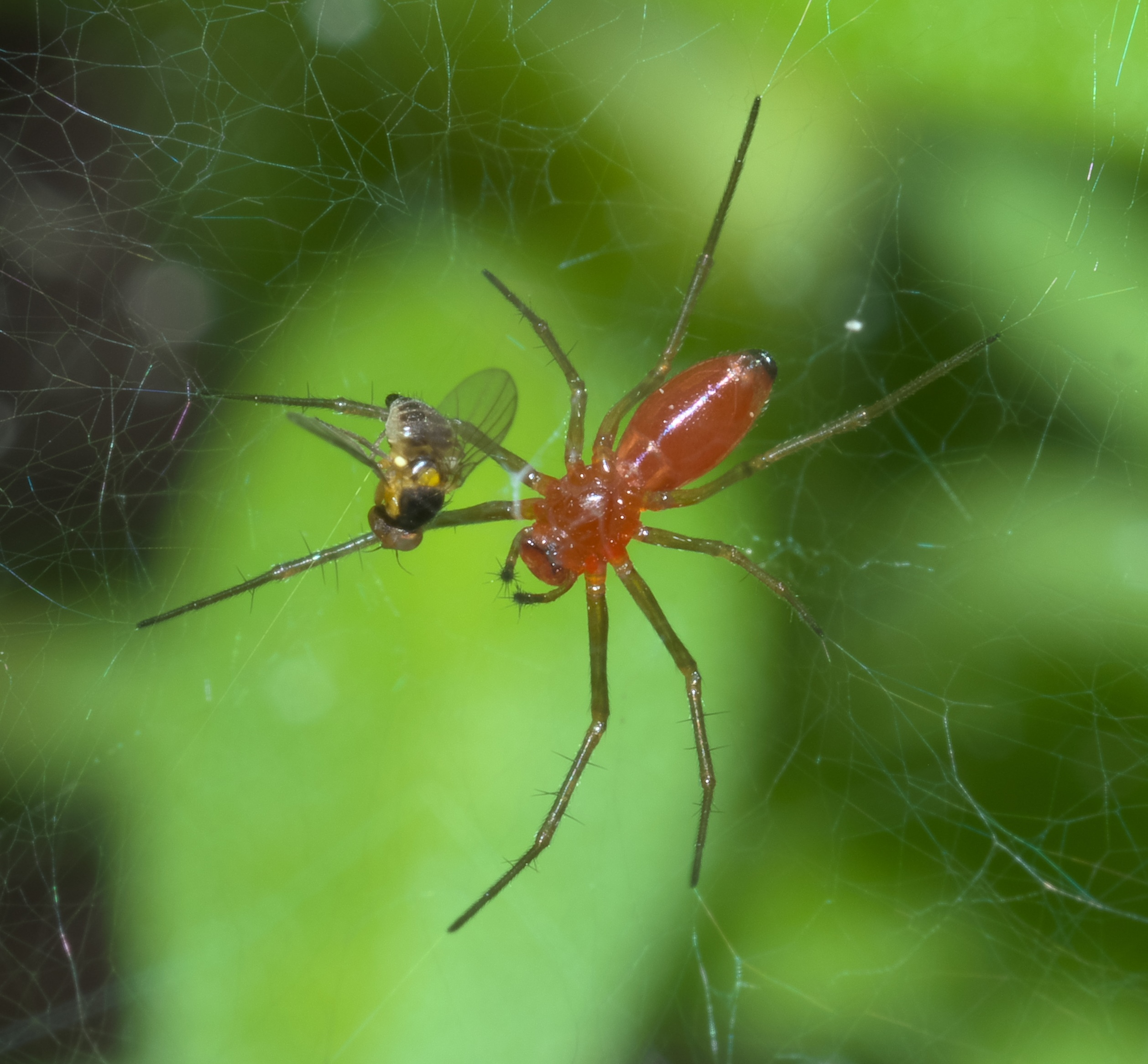

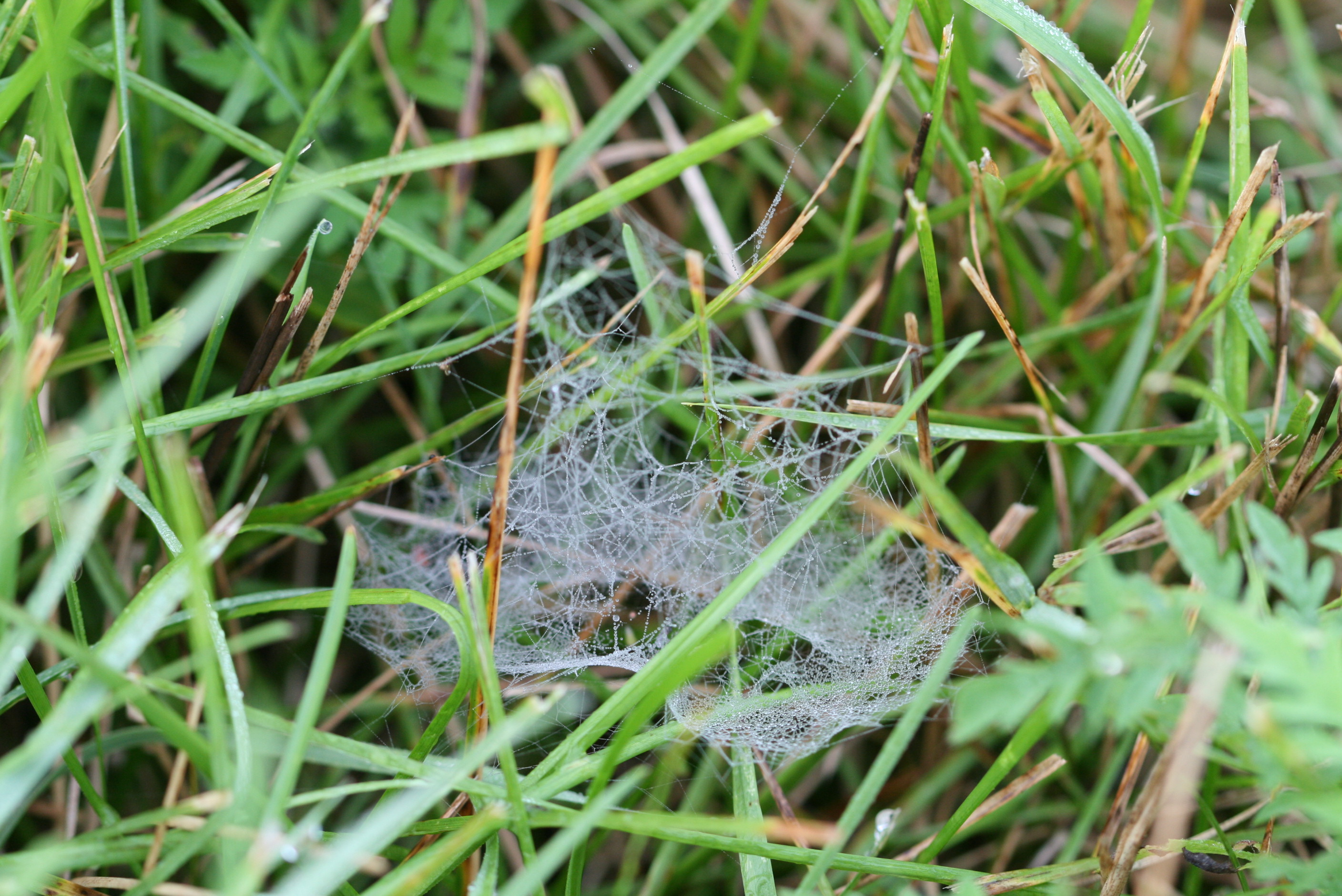
- Web of Florinda coccinea, showing stopping threads above and sheet below.

Scientific classification
- Kingdom: Animalia
- Phylum: Arthropoda
- Subphylum: Chelicerata
- Class: Arachnida
- Order: Araneae
- Infraorder: Araneomorphae
- Family: Linyphiidae
- Genus: Florinda; O. Pickard-Cambridge, 1896
- Species: F. coccinea

Binomial name
- Florinda coccinea (Hentz, 1850)

Synonyms
- Linyphiella Banks, 1905

= Blacktailed red sheetweaver =

Genus of spiders

The blacktailed red sheetweaver (Florinda coccinea), also known as red grass spider, is a species of dwarf spider. It is the only species in the monotypic genus Florinda. It was first described by Octavius Pickard-Cambridge in 1896, and has only been found in Mexico, the West Indies, and the United States. It is common in the southeastern United States, inhabiting grasslands, lawns, and agricultural fields.

== Description ==
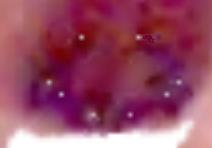
Eyes of the spider

F. coccinea are bright red in color, with a black caudal tubercle. Adults typically grow to 3 to 4 millimetres (0.12 to 0.16 in) long, with females growing slightly larger than males. They have two rows of eyes; two on the top row and six procurved on the bottom.

Webs spun by F. coccinea consist of a horizontal sheet of non-sticky silk, and a tangle of stopping threads above. The stopping threads intercept flying prey and cause them to fall into the sheet below, where they are attacked by the spider.
