= Cryptolasma =

Scientific classification
- Domain: Eukaryota
- Kingdom: Animalia
- Phylum: Arthropoda
- Subphylum: Chelicerata
- Class: Arachnida
- Order: Opiliones
- Family: Nemastomatidae
- Subfamily: Ortholasmatinae
- Genus: Cryptolasma; Cruz-López, Cruz-Bonilla & Francke, 2018

Diversity
- 2 species

Genus of harvestmen/daddy longlegs

Cryptolasma is a genus of harvestmen in the family Nemastomatidae with two described species (as of 2023). Both species are found in the Central eastern region of Mexico in Veracruz state.

== Description ==
The genus Cryptolasma was described by Cruz-López, Cruz-Bonilla & Francke, 2018, with the type species Cryptolasma aberrante Cruz-López, Cruz-Bonilla & Francke, 2018. The genus is said to be easily recognized from other ortholasmatines by a unique character combination.

== Species ==
These two species belong to the genus Cryptolasma:

- Cryptolasma aberrante Cruz-López, Cruz-Bonilla & Francke, 2018 – Mexico
- Cryptolasma citlaltepetl Cruz-López, Cruz-Bonilla & Francke, 2018 – Mexico

== Etymology ==
The genus is neuter. The generic name is a combination of the prefix crypto- from the Greek kryptós meaning hidden or secret, with -lasma, a common suffix of the subfamily; in reference to the peculiar cryptic habits.
