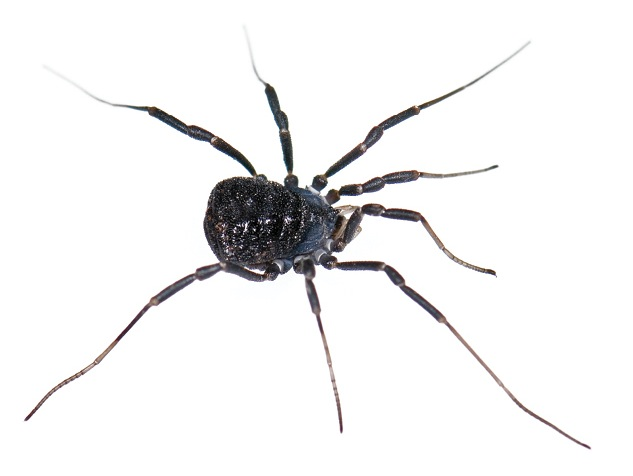
- Acuclavella shoshone

Scientific classification
- Domain: Eukaryota
- Kingdom: Animalia
- Phylum: Arthropoda
- Subphylum: Chelicerata
- Class: Arachnida
- Order: Opiliones
- Family: Ischyropsalididae
- Subfamily: Ceratolasmatinae
- Genus: Acuclavella; Shear, 1986

= Acuclavella =

Genus of harvestmen/daddy longlegs

Acuclavella is a genus of thorn harvestmen in the family Ischyropsalididae, found in the Pacific Northwest. There are about seven described species in Acuclavella.

Acuclavella was formerly a member of the family Ceratolasmatidae, but was moved to Ischyropsalididae, along with Ceratolasmatidae which became the subfamily Ceratolasmatinae.

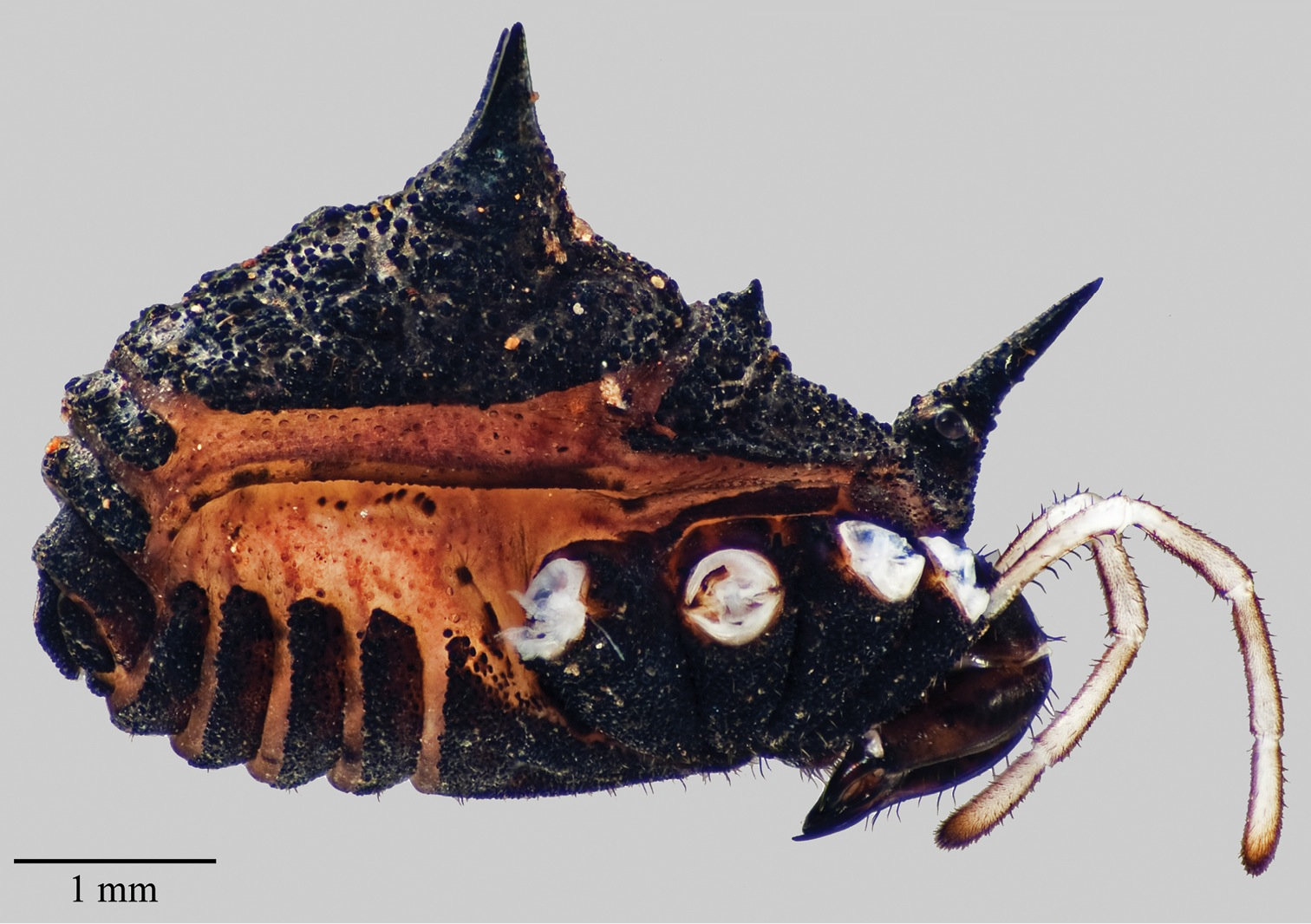
Acuclavella leonardi

== Species ==
These seven species belong to the genus Acuclavella:

- Acuclavella cosmetoides Shear, 1986
- Acuclavella leonardi Richart and Hedin, 2013
- Acuclavella makah Richart and Hedin, 2013
- Acuclavella merickeli Shear, 1986
- Acuclavella quattuor Shear, 1986
- Acuclavella sheari Richart and Hedin, 2013
- Acuclavella shoshone Shear, 1986
