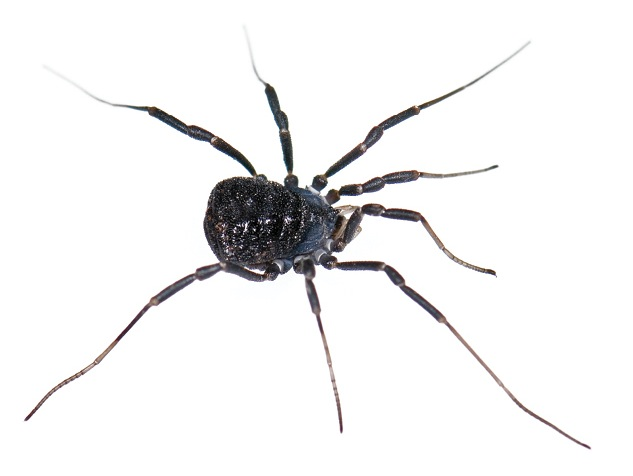

Scientific classification
- Domain: Eukaryota
- Kingdom: Animalia
- Phylum: Arthropoda
- Subphylum: Chelicerata
- Class: Arachnida
- Order: Opiliones
- Family: Ischyropsalididae
- Genus: Acuclavella
- Species: A. shoshone

Binomial name
- Acuclavella shoshone Shear, 1986

= Acuclavella shoshone =

Species of harvestman/daddy longlegs

Acuclavella shoshone is a species of harvestman in the family Ischryopsalididae. It is found in North America.
