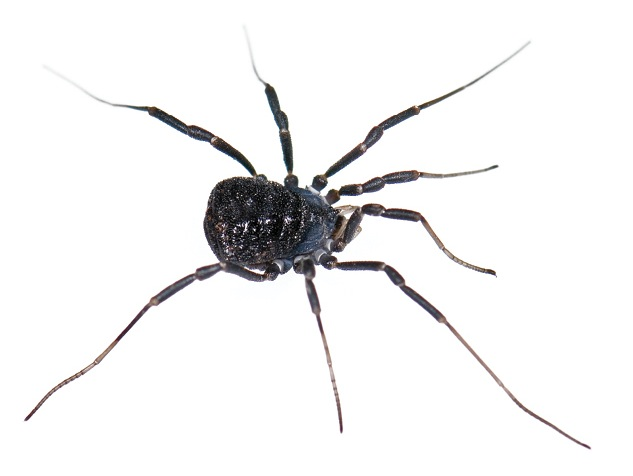
- Acuclavella shoshone

Scientific classification
- Kingdom: Animalia
- Phylum: Arthropoda
- Subphylum: Chelicerata
- Class: Arachnida
- Order: Opiliones
- Superfamily: Ischyropsalidoidea
- Family: Ischyropsalididae; Simon, 1879

Subfamilies
- Ceratolasmatinae Shear, 1986; Ischyropsalidinae Simon, 1879

= Ischyropsalididae =

Family of harvestmen/daddy longlegs

Ischyropsalididae is a family of harvestmen with 35 described species in 3 genera, found in Europe and North America.

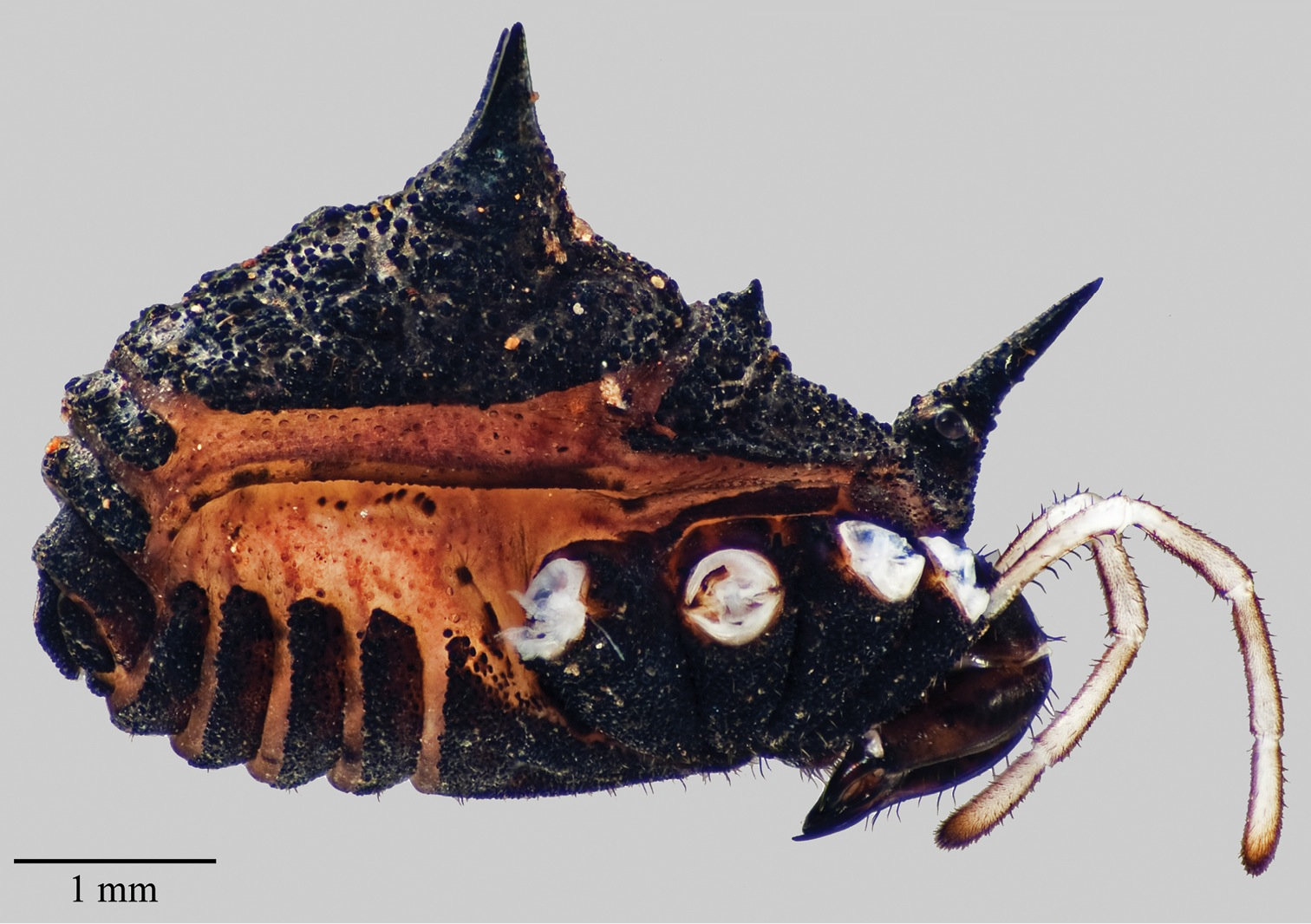
Acuclavella leonardi

== Species ==
The following species belong to the family Ischyropsalididae:

- Acuclavella Shear, 1986 (thorn harvestmen)
  - Acuclavella cosmetoides Shear, 1986
  - Acuclavella leonardi Richart & Hedin, 2013
  - Acuclavella makah Richart & Hedin, 2013
  - Acuclavella merickeli Shear, 1986
  - Acuclavella quattuor Shear, 1986
  - Acuclavella shear Richart & Hedin, 2013
  - Acuclavella shoshone Shear, 1986
- Ceratolasma Goodnight & Goodnight, 1942
  - Ceratolasma tricantha Goodnight & Goodnight, 1942
- Ischyropsalis C.L.Koch, 1839
  - Ischyropsalis adamii Canestrini, 1873
  - Ischyropsalis alpinula Martens, 1978
  - Ischyropsalis cantabrica Luque & Labrada, 2012
  - Ischyropsalis carli Lessert, 1905
  - Ischyropsalis dentipalpis Canestrini, 1872
  - Ischyropsalis dispar Simon, 1872
  - Ischyropsalis gigantea Dresco, 1968
  - Ischyropsalis noltei Dresco, 1972
  - Ischyropsalis hadzii Roewer, 1950
  - Ischyropsalis hellwigii (Panzer, 1794)
    - Ischyropsalis hellwigii hellwigii (Panzer, 1794)
    - Ischyropsalis hellwigii lucantei Simon, 1879
  - Ischyropsalis hispanica Roewer, 1953
  - Ischyropsalis kollari C.L. Koch, 1839
  - Ischyropsalis lithoclasica Schönhofer & Martens, 2010
  - Ischyropsalis luteipes Simon, 1872
  - Ischyropsalis magdalenae Simon, 1881
  - Ischyropsalis manicata C.L. Koch, 1869
  - Ischyropsalis muellneri Harmann, 1898
  - Ischyropsalis navarrensis Roewer, 1950
  - Ischyropsalis nodifera Simon, 1879
  - Ischyropsalis petiginosa Simon, 1913
  - Ischyropsalis pyrenaea Simon, 1872
  - Ischyropsalis ravasinii Hadži, 1942
  - Ischyropsalis robusta Simon, 1872
  - Ischyropsalis strandi Kratochvíl, 1936

Uncertain status:

  - Ischyropsalis aguerana Luque & Labrada, 2023
  - Ischyropsalis impressa Luque & Labrada, 2023
