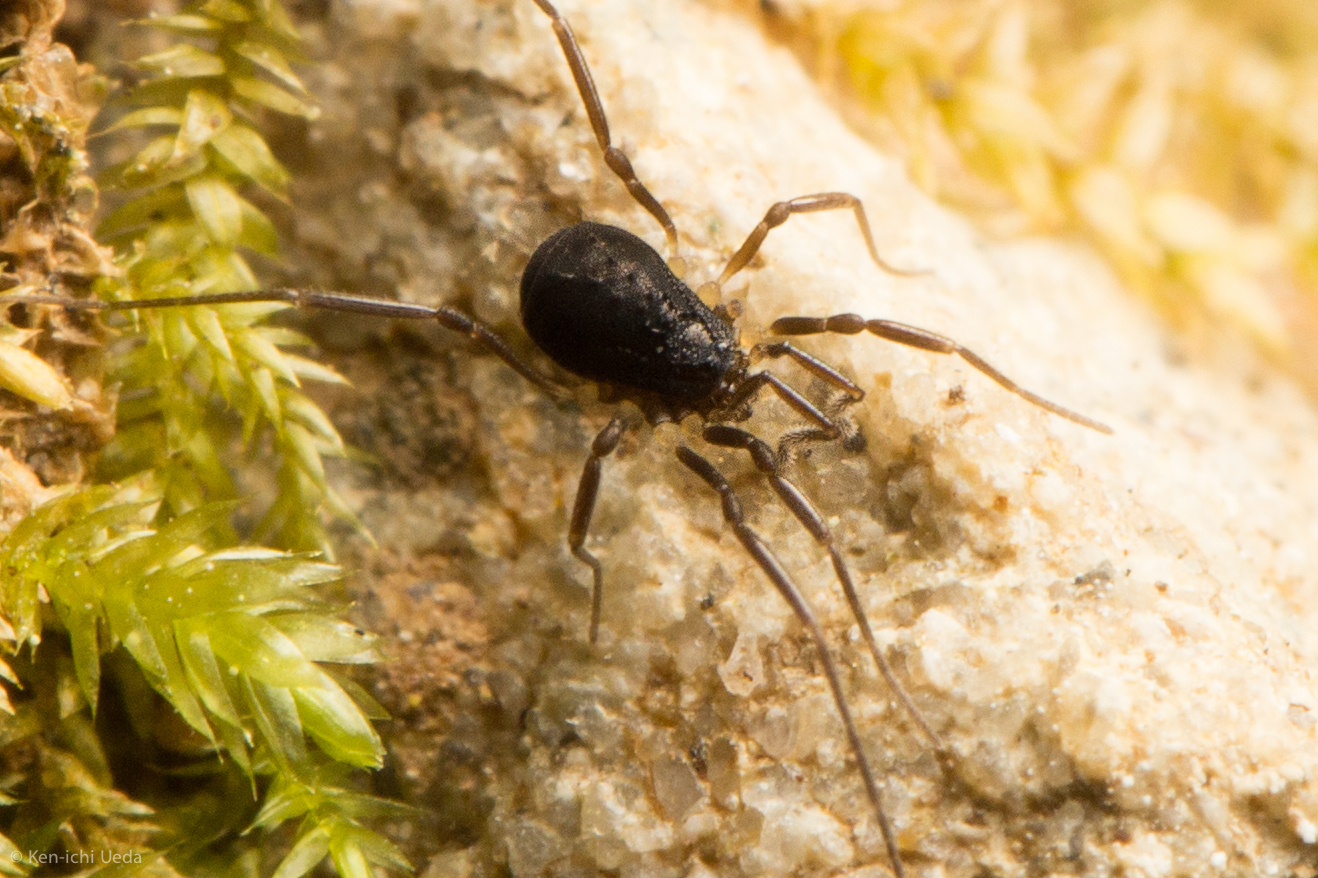
- Hesperonemastoma modestum

Scientific classification
- Domain: Eukaryota
- Kingdom: Animalia
- Phylum: Arthropoda
- Subphylum: Chelicerata
- Class: Arachnida
- Order: Opiliones
- Family: Taracidae
- Genus: Hesperonemastoma; Gruber, 1970

= Hesperonemastoma =

Genus of harvestmen/daddy longlegs

Hesperonemastoma is a genus of harvestmen in the family Taracidae. There are about five described species in Hesperonemastoma.

== Species ==
These five species belong to the genus Hesperonemastoma:

- Hesperonemastoma kepharti (Crosby & Bishop, 1924)
- Hesperonemastoma modestum (Banks, 1894)
- Hesperonemastoma packardi (Roewer, 1914)
- Hesperonemastoma pallidimaculosum (C.J. Goodnight & M.L. Goodnight, 1945)
- Hesperonemastoma smilax Shear, 2010
