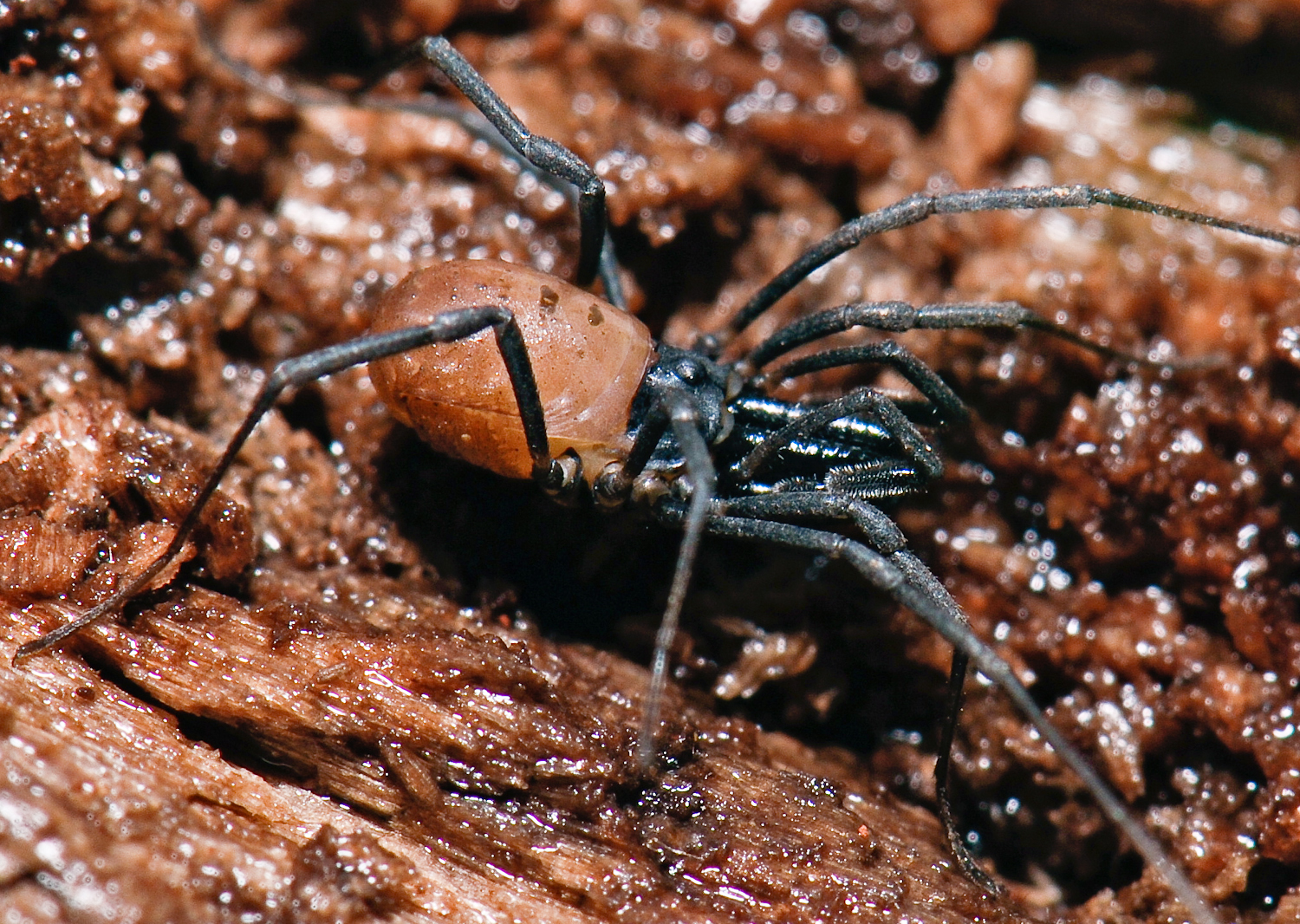

Scientific classification
- Kingdom: Animalia
- Phylum: Arthropoda
- Subphylum: Chelicerata
- Class: Arachnida
- Order: Opiliones
- Family: Taracidae
- Genus: Taracus; Simon, 1879

= Taracus =

Genus of harvestmen

Taracus is a genus of harvestman, or Opiliones, typically found living in limestone and lava caves in the United States. They grow to a size of 2.0–5.5 mm (0.08–0.22 in).

== Taxonomy ==
Taracus contains the following species, per World Catalog of Opiliones. Of the 14 described species (as of 2023), almost all are found in the United States.

- Taracus aspenae Shear, 2018 (USA: Oregon)
- Taracus audisioae Shear, 2016 (USA: California)
- Taracus birsteini Ljovuschkin, 1971 (Russia: Primorsky Krai)
- Taracus carmanah Shear, 2016 (Canada: British Columbia)
- Taracus fluvipileus Shear, 2016 (USA: California)
- Taracus gertschi Goodnight & Goodnight, 1942 (USA: Idaho, Oregon, etc; Canada: Alberta, British Columbia)
- Taracus marchingtoni Shear & Warfel, 2016 (USA: Oregon)
- Taracus packardi Simon, 1879 (USA: Colorado, New Mexico)
- Taracus pallipes Banks, 1894 (USA: Washington, Oregon, California)
- Taracus silvestrii Roewer, 1930 (USA: Oregon)
- Taracus spesavius Shear, 2016 (USA: Nevada)
- Taracus taylori Shear, 2016 (USA: Nevada)
- Taracus timpanogos Shear, 2016 (USA: Utah)
- Taracus ubicki Shear, 2016 (USA: California)

Elsewhere (as of 2023): For Taracus spinosus Banks, 1894 and its synonym Taracus malkini Goodnight & Goodnight, 1945 see Oskoron spinosus (Banks, 1894). For Taracus nigripes Goodnight & Goodnight, 1943 see as synonym of Taracus packardi Simon, 1879.
