= Ceratolasma =

Scientific classification
- Domain: Eukaryota
- Kingdom: Animalia
- Phylum: Arthropoda
- Subphylum: Chelicerata
- Class: Arachnida
- Order: Opiliones
- Family: Ischyropsalididae
- Genus: Ceratolasma; C.J. Goodnight & M.L. Goodnight, 1942
- Species: C. tricantha

Binomial name
- Ceratolasma tricantha C.J. Goodnight & M.L. Goodnight, 1942

Genus of harvestmen/daddy longlegs

Ceratolasma is a genus of harvestmen in the family Ischyropsalididae, found in the Pacific Northwest. There is one described species in Ceratolasma, C. tricantha.

Ceratolasma was formerly a member of the family Ceratolasmatidae, but was moved to Ischyropsalididae, along with Ceratolasmatidae which became the subfamily Ceratolasmatinae.
