= Perennial water =

Body of continuously-existing water

Perennial water body usually refers to mainly liquid fresh water, as opposed to sea and glaciers or other ice. Most frequently the term refers to running water (lotic ecosystems) as in perennial streams and large rivers, but the distinction between perennial and non-perennial water is of equal importance in lentic aquatic ecosystems, those that are associated with relatively still terrestrial waters such as lakes and ponds. Simplistically a perennial water body is one that keeps full or flowing throughout the year for all or most years, but in practice there are degrees and kinds of distinction. The definition is not precise, because most water bodies vary in fullness according to the season, and according to the heaviness of precipitation and other factors during any given year. Also, the water level in many such water bodies as do not actually dry out, may nonetheless drop so drastically that their surface area is greatly reduced. They even may be split into several separate water bodies with dry land between, either arid or covered with vegetation. The internal ecology of such water may differ drastically between periods of drought and deep water. In some cases the seasonal cycle is ecologically important, whereas in other examples exceptional water levels are too rare to be taken routinely into account. There also may be effectively permanent changes; increasingly frequently even large rivers have lost their perennial status under the burden of the human demand for fresh water for purposes of agriculture, industry or the needs of the populations of large cities. The Colorado River for instance has run dry for extended periods in most years since 1960 without reaching the sea. Intermittent or ephemeral streams are those that run dry repeatedly, either seasonally or soon after rain stops. Some definitions of perennial water bodies specifically include those that only are perennial except in years of severe or unusual drought.

Perennial standing (lentic) water is usually called a lake or a pond, but there are several local or dialect English words for such features. Examples include mere, tarn, loch or fen. Each has a special meaning, though modern usage tends to be loose. Vlei is a foreign example that may or may not mean a perennial body of water, but more often than not refers to a seasonal pond.
