= East Cliff and Warren Country Park =

Country park in Kent, England

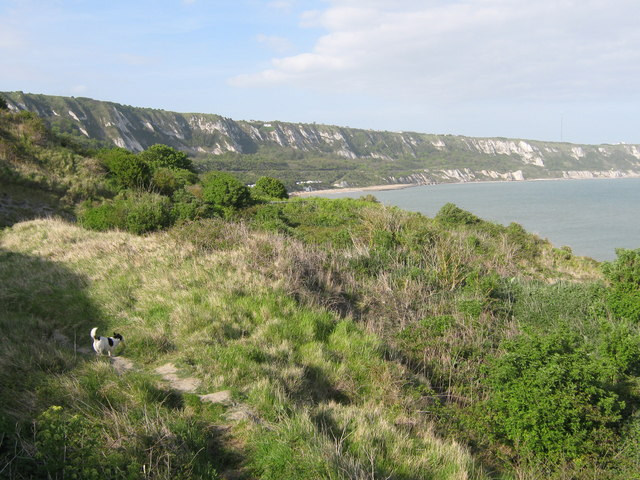
- Warren Country Park
- Interactive map of East Cliff and Warren Country Park
- Coordinates: 51°06′01″N 1°13′10″E
- Area: 299 acres (121 ha)
- Created: 1924
- Operator: Folkestone Town Council,
- Status: Open 7 days a week, dawn until dusk
- Website: East Cliff and Warren County Park

Warren Country Park shown within Kent (grid reference TR250381)

East Cliff and Warren Country Park is in Folkestone, in Kent, England. This country park is formed of the East Cliffs of Folkestone, the sandy beaches of East Wear Bay and the land-slipped nature reserve land between the cliffs and the sea.

== History ==
On the east cliffs, are three Martello Towers. These were built on the cliffs in 1804–09 to protect against the French invasion of Napoleon. Number 3, since 1990 is used as a Martello Tower visitor centre by Folkestone and Hythe Council. Beside it is an information panel describing the Roman villa ruins on the site. In 1875 until 1892, near Martello Tower 1, was a public house called the Warren Inn. It was closed after people were caught drinking after hours. The Earl of Radnor had it closed, as it was on his land. The east cliffs were popular with Victorians who picnicked on the grassy meadows of the cliffs before heading down towards the sandy beaches. The area was popular with burrowing rabbits and was named informally 'The Warren'.

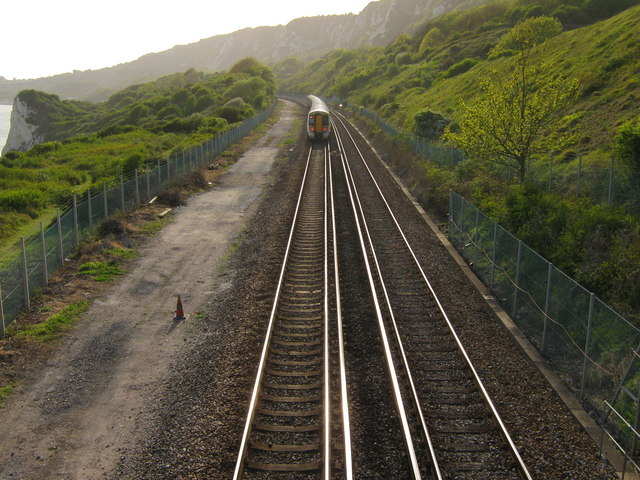
Railway in the Warren (site of the former Halt Station)

In 1884, the South East Main Line railway was built from Ashford to Folkestone and then onwards to Dover, through the Warren. Folkestone Warren Halt railway station was opened in 1886, and a bridge was built over the Main Line leading to a gate on to The Warren from which the public could picnic and enjoy the dramatic scenery in the area. Also a zig-zag path led down the East Cliff to the station.

In December 1915, a large landslip resulted in the entire undercliff supporting the Main Line moved towards the sea causing approximately 1.5 million cubic metres of chalk to slip or fall burying Warren Halt and the railway line. No-one was hurt in the occurrence. This was one of the largest landslides in Kent. The station and the line were closed until 1919.

The Warren was still a popular picnic spot in Edwardian times and a nearby tea chalet served hundreds of visitors daily. The land was then defended from coastal erosion with the intentional effect of stopping any more landslips to the land beyond the line. In 1923, the Halt Station was rebuilt by the Southern Railway which added a set of platforms. The station remained open for a further 16 years before another landslip in 1939.

In 1924, the land was given to the council of Folkestone for perpetual recreational use by the Earls of Radnor during the 19th century, and the country park was formed soon after by the council. The park covers an area of 299.4 hectares (or 739.8 acres (2,994,000 m^{2}))

It has various paths leading through it towards the coastline and beach, or up to the cliffs towards Old Dover Road.

Part of it is Folkestone Warren Site of Special Scientific Interest, designated for both its biology and geology. The site is well known for the amount of fossils being found in the park, and the landslips are of great interest to those studying geomorphology. The land is generally formed out of Gault Clay (for the cliffs) and sandstone for the more resistant rocky headland of Copt Point. The site of a World War II observation post.

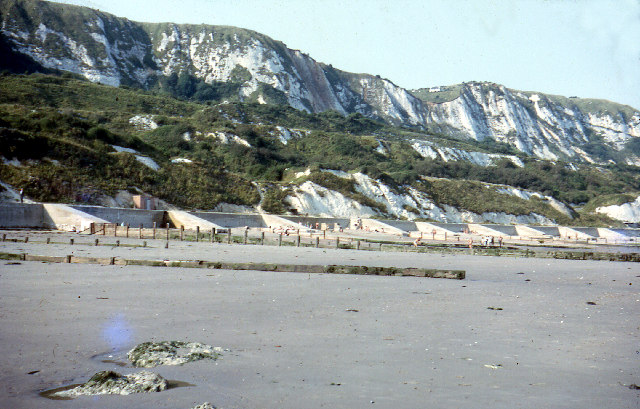
East Cliffs

After the Country Park was set up, grazing animals were banned, this has allowed shrubs and trees to seed naturally across the site. Patches of wildflower meadow still exist and these are the favoured habitats of various rare insects. Including a harvestman (Trogulus tricarinatus) and a millipede (Polydesmus testaceus). Also rare plant species in the park include; wild cabbage (Brassica oleracea), the Dover variety of Nottingham catchfly (Silene nutans var. nutans) and the extremely local clove-scented broom rape (Orobanche caryophyllacea).

The Warren is an important habitat for many insects. Over 330 species of moth have been recorded visiting the site, including the continental migrant sub-angled wave moth (Scopula nigropunctata). The fiery clearwing moth (Pyropteron chrysidiforme) is only found here, as well as many butterflies. The grayling butterfly has a small colony in the site, the only one in Kent.

The White Cliffs Countryside Project (WCCP), who are assisting by local volunteers to maintain the remaining areas of chalk grassland and meadow. They have created open grassy corridor habitats along the footpaths so that the wild flowers and insects can survive and access other parts of the important nature reserve.

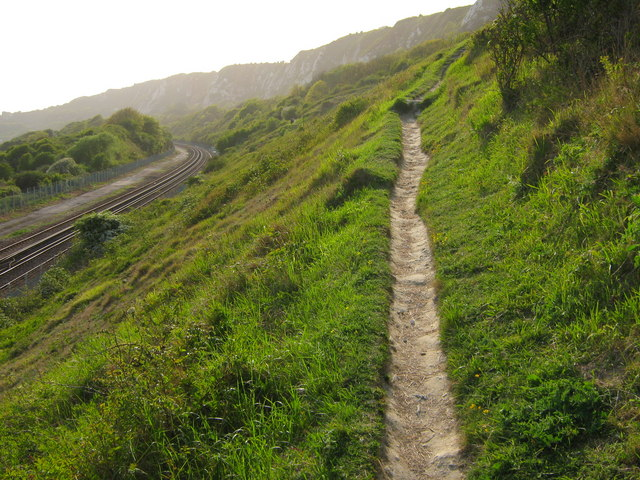
Warren Country Park

The Saxon Shore Way and North Downs Way, (long-distance trails lead through the park between Folkestone and Dover, via Capel-le-Ferne.

Beside Wear Bay Road, on the northern fringes of the park, is Little Switzerland Camping Site; it is so named because of the mountainous-looking white cliffs nearby. The forementioned Tea Chalet is within the camp site.

== Location ==
From Wear Bay Road in Folkestone, access to the Warren is from the Martello Towers on East Cliff, from a small car park past Little Switzerland Camp site, or via a cliffside path from New Dover Road, near Capel-le-Ferne.

== In popular culture ==
Author Russell Hoban repurposes the Warren as the "Warnings" in his 1980, post apocalyptic novel Riddley Walker.
