= History of Kent =

English county history

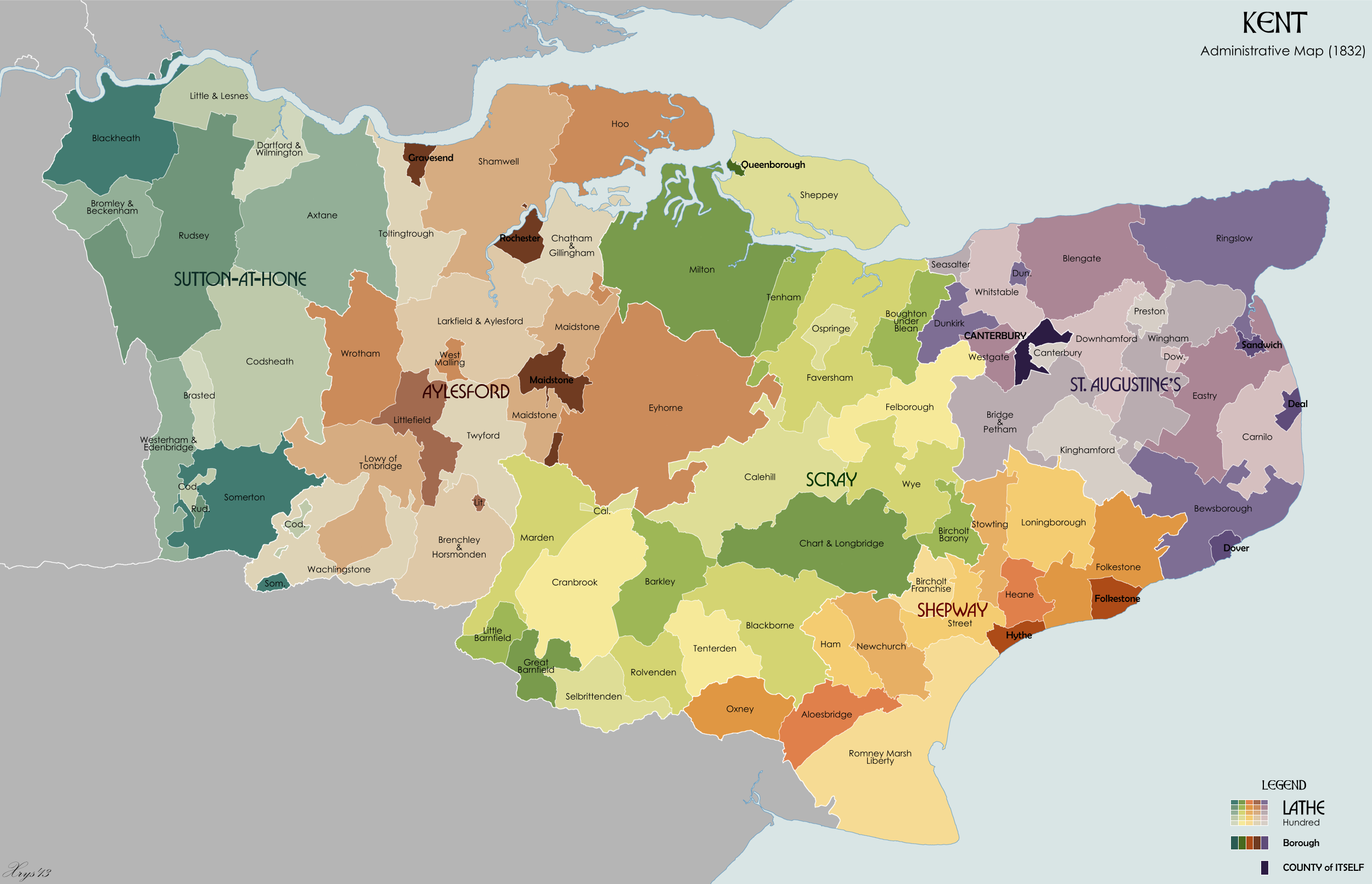
County of Kent, showing lathes and hundreds, in 1832

Kent is a traditional county in South East England with long-established human occupation.

== Prehistoric Kent ==
The discovery of stone tools at the Lower Palaeolithic site of Chequer's Wood and Old Park, near Canterbury, provides the earliest evidence of human occupation in Kent, as early as 712,000–621,000 years ago. The early human species who made these tools was likely Homo antecessor or Homo heidelbergensis. This is the earliest securely dated site with Acheulean stone tools in northern Europe. The Old Park site is also important for retaining evidence of very early Neanderthal populations visiting Britain during the Anglian Glaciation, the most severe glaciation of the last two million years. Although they likely visited during the brief, warmer interstadial periods within this broader ice age period.

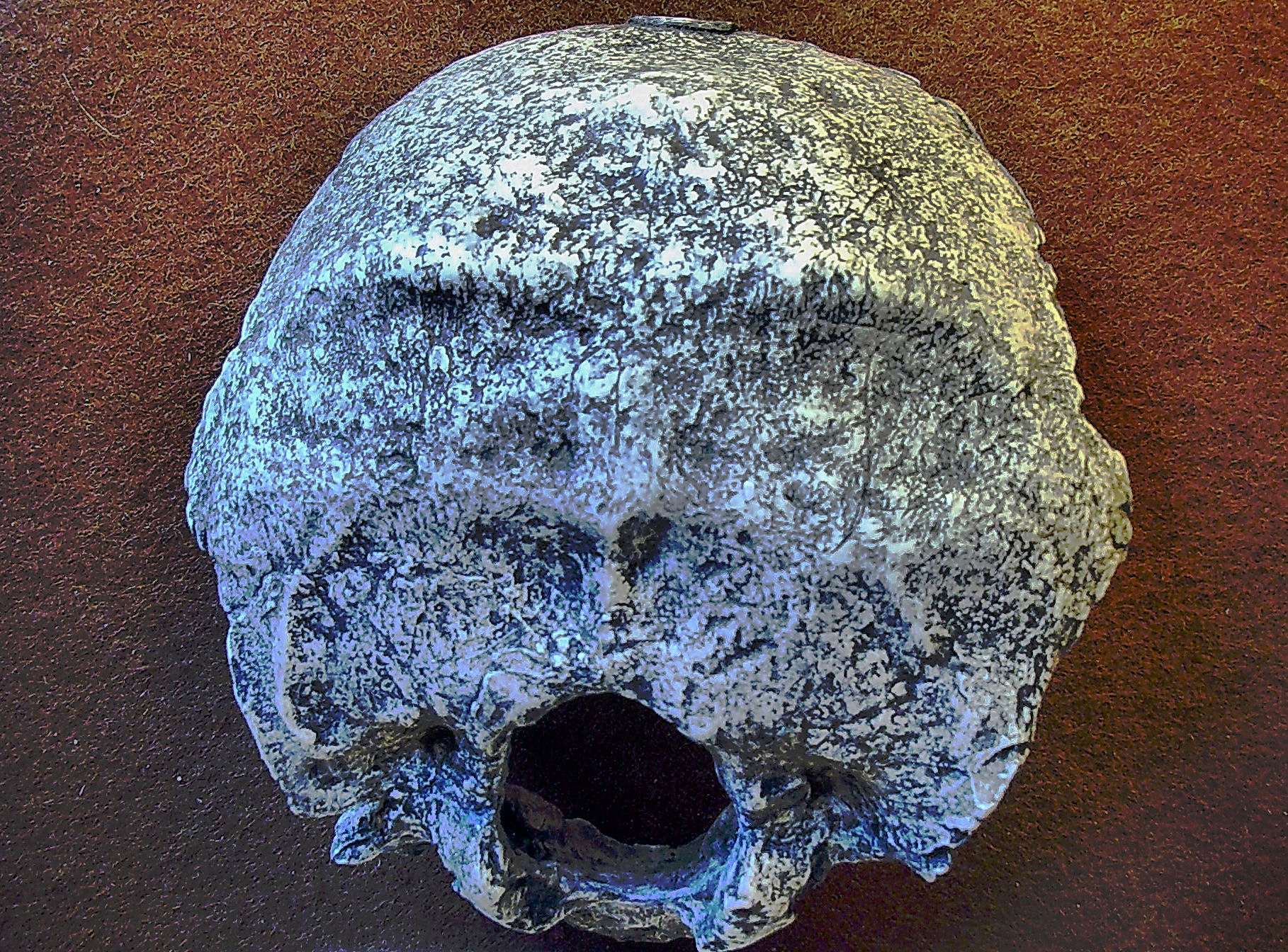
Swanscombe Skull

The Swanscombe skull, uncovered at Barnfield Pit, a quarry in Swanscombe, is the oldest human skull found in Britain. It is difficult to say much about the three fragments of skull from one individual, as they are all from the rear of the skull, but Chris Stringer suggests that they come from a female, some of whose characteristics suggest she is from a population ancestral to Neanderthals. It dates to the Hoxnian Interglacial, a warming period 400,000 years ago.

In June 2023 researchers from UCL Archaeology Southeast over 800 stone tools, including two giant handles dating to over 300,000 years ago, were discovered on a hillside near Medway Valley in Frindsbury near Strood. At the time the area was a wild landscape of forests and river valleys with animals including red deer, straight-tusked elephants, lions and horses.

During the Neolithic the Medway megaliths were built and there is a rich sequence of Bronze Age occupation indicated by finds and features such as the Ringlemere gold cup.

== Iron Age Kent ==
The name Kent probably means 'rim' or 'border' (compare the dictionary words cant in English, Kant in German, etc.), regarding the eastern part of the modern county as a 'border land' or 'coastal district.' Historical linguists believe that the proto-Indo-European root *kanthos could not pass into a Germanic language with its initial K sound intact, so the word must have passed via an intermediate language, either Celtic or Latin. Julius Caesar described it as Cantium, although he did not record the inhabitants' name for themselves, in 51 BC. His writings suggest localised groups of people whose chieftains were flattered by his description of them as 'kings'. Writing of the Britons generally in his Commentarii de Bello Gallico Caesar noted that: "...by far the most civilised are those who inhabit Cantium, the whole of which is a maritime region; and their manners differ little from those of the Gauls". Pottery studies indicate the county east of the River Medway was inhabited by Belgic peoples who were part of an economic and cultural region embracing south east England and the lands across the English Channel.

The extreme west of the modern county was occupied by other Celtic Iron Age tribes; the Regni and possibly another ethnic group occupying The Weald known today as the Wealden People. During the late pre-Roman Iron Age the names of a few British kings are known, such as Dumnovellaunus and Adminius. An Iron Age settlement seems to have formed the basis for the later town of Folkestone, whilst a hillfort of that date seems to be the forerunner of Dover Castle.

== Roman Kent ==
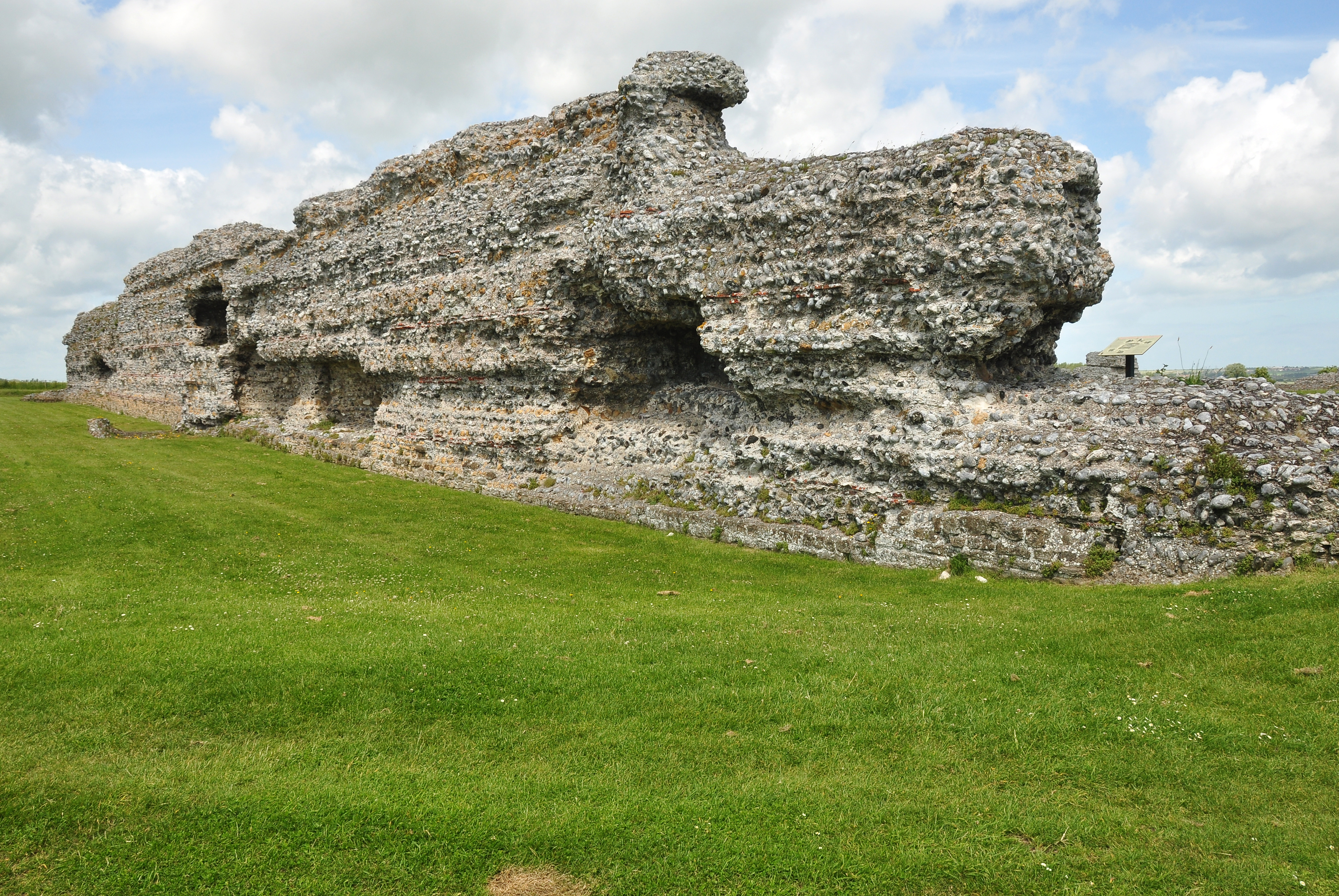
Part of the ruins of Richborough Roman fort

Although now two miles from the sea amid the marshes of east Kent, Richborough Roman fort was arguably the Romans' main entry point when they invaded Britain in circa AD 43. They established a bridgehead and commemorated their success by building a triumphal arch whose cross shaped foundations still survive at the site which is now looked after by English Heritage.

Roman Britain was under attack by Saxon and other raiders in the 3rd century and it became necessary to fortify the once-prosperous commercial port of Rutupiae. Triple ditches and ramparts were dug (still visible round the site of the arch Richborough Roman fort although the defences were completely revamped after a decade or so and Richborough was provided with its circuit of towered stone walls and outer ditches, becoming one of the most important of the Saxon shore forts. It was one of the last to be regularly occupied and there is evidence of a large Roman population here in the early 5th century, some of them worshipping in the early Christian church discovered in a corner of the fort.

== Early Medieval Kent ==
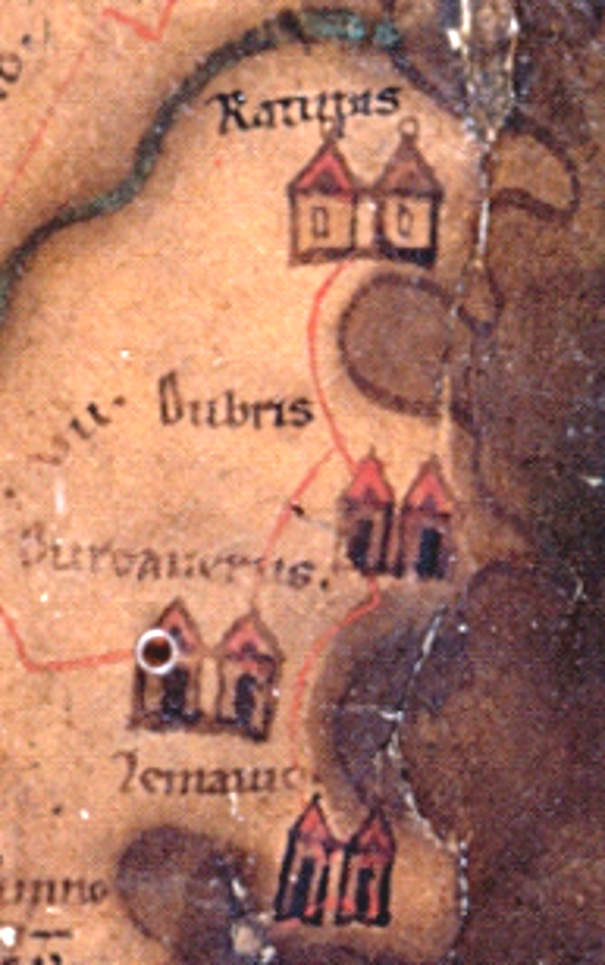
Kent in the 4th century shown on the Peutinger Map.

Following the withdrawal of the Romans, a large-scale immigration of Germanic peoples occurred in Kent. These groups introduced the Old English language to Britain. It is likely that some of the native Romano-Britons remained in the area, however, as they were able to influence its name (recorded as Cantia or Cent) even after the settlement of the Germanic tribes. East Kent became one of the kingdoms of the Jutes during the 5th century (see Kingdom of Kent). The early Medieval inhabitants of the county were known as the Cantwara or Kentish people, whose capital (the only town called a metropolis by Bede) was at Canterbury.

Canterbury is the religious centre of the Anglican faith, and see of Saint Augustine of Canterbury. Augustine is traditionally credited with bringing Christianity to Anglo-Saxon England, landing at Ebbsfleet, Pegwell Bay on the Isle of Thanet (northeast of Kent) in the spring of 597.

A lathe was an ancient administration division of Kent, and may well have originated during the Jutish colonisation of the county. These ancient divisions still exist, but have no administrative significance today. There were seven Lathes in Kent at the time of the Domesday Book, which reveals that in 1086 Kent was divided into the seven lathes or "lest(um)": Aylesford, Milton, Sutton, Borough, Eastry, Lympne and Wye. For administrative, judicial and taxation purposes these units remained important for another 600 years, although by 1295 the number of lathes had reduced to five: Borough and Eastry were merged to form the Lathe of St. Augustine, the lathe of Lympne was renamed the Lathe of Shepway, the lathes of Milton and Wye were merged to form the Lathe of Scray. Each of the lathes were divided into smaller areas called hundreds, although the difference between the functions of lathes and hundreds remains unclear.

== Medieval Kent ==
Following the invasion of Britain by William of Normandy the people of Kent adopted the motto Invicta meaning "unconquered" and claimed that they had frightened the Normans away. This claim was given credence by the fact that the Normans had quickly marched to London without subduing the Kentish lords and peasantry, constantly harassed and ambushed by the Kentish populace at every turn. Kent did not submit to Norman rule until their rights and privileges had been acknowledged and unmolested. As a result, Kent became a semi-autonomous County Palatine under William's half-brother Odo of Bayeux, with the special powers otherwise reserved for counties bordering Wales and Scotland. A decade after the Norman Conquest, Penenden Heath near Maidstone was the scene of a successful trial of Odo of Bayeux. The trial, ordered by William I at the behest of Lanfranc, Archbishop of Canterbury challenged the Earl's purported landholdings in the county, an event which represented an important attempt by Saxon landowners to reassert their pre-Norman rights and privileges.

Gavelkind was an example of customary law in England. After the Norman Conquest, gavelkind was superseded by the feudal law of primogeniture in the rest of England, but in Kent gavelkind meant that on death, a man's property was equally divided amongst his surviving sons, which led to land being divided into ever smaller parcels. Therefore, the strip system of farming in open fields was never established in Kent. This gives evidence to the Invicta legend and seems to support that, at least among smaller landowners and common folk, Normans, were forced to respect Kentish rights and law. Gavelkind was finally abolished by the Law of Property Act in 1925.

Canterbury became a great pilgrimage site following the martyrdom of Thomas Becket (1119/20–1170), who was eventually canonised in 1246. Canterbury's religious role also gave rise to Chaucer's Canterbury Tales, a key development in the rise of the written English language and ostensibly set in the countryside of Kent. Rochester had its own martyr, William of Perth, and in 1256 Lawrence, Bishop of Rochester travelled to Rome to obtain William's canonisation.

During the medieval period, Kent produced several rebellions including the Peasants' Revolt led by Wat Tyler and later, Jack Cade's rebellion of 1450. Thomas Wyatt led an army into London from Kent in 1553, against Mary I.

As well as numerous fortified manor houses, Kent has a number of traditional militarily significant castles, including those at Allington, Chilham, Dover, Hever, Leeds, Rochester and Walmer, built to protect the coast, the River Medway or routes into London.

== Early Modern Kent ==
The Royal Navy first used the River Medway in 1547 when a storehouse was rented on 'Jyllingham Water'. By the reign of Elizabeth I (1558–1603) a small dockyard had been established at Chatham. By 1618, storehouses, a ropewalk, a drydock and houses for officials had been built downstream from Chatham.

By the 17th century, tensions between Britain and the continental powers of the Netherlands and France led to increasing military build-up in the county. Forts were built along the coast following a raid by the Dutch navy on the shipyards of the Medway towns in 1667. Kent also played a significant role in the English Civil War around 1648.

The 18th century was dominated with wars with France, and the Medway became the prime position to base a fleet that would act against the Dutch and French Coasts. When the theatre of operation moved to the Atlantic, Portsmouth and Plymouth assumed these roles and Chatham concentrated on shipbuilding and ship repair. Many of the Georgian naval buildings are still extant. In peacetime the work force at Chatham Dockyard was reduced to a quarter of its wartime roll.

Chatham Dockyard built over 400 naval ships including HMS Victory in the age of ships of the line, ironclads including HMS Africa 1905, and 57 submarines, while also refitting ships. The keel for HMS Victory was laid at Chatham on 23 July 1759. During World War II, Chatham refitted 1360 warships such as HMS Ajax. Charles Dickens' father worked in the dockyard, and Chatham, Rochester and the Cliffe marshes were to feature in many of his books.

As an indication of the area's military importance, the first Ordnance Survey map ever drawn was the 1 inch map of Kent, published in 1801. Work on the map started in 1795.

In the early 19th century smugglers were very active on the Kent coastline, with gangs, such as the Aldington Gang bringing spirits, tobacco and salt to Kent, taking goods like wool across the English Channel to France.

On Saturday night, 28 August 1830, a widespread uprising by rural workers began in East Kent, with the destruction of threshing machines in the Elham Valley area and by the third week of October, over one hundred machines had been destroyed. The uprising, that eventually became known as the Swing Riots, spread across southern England and East Anglia. The general unrest, particularly about the state of the workhouses, was instrumental in the introduction of the Poor Law Amendment Act 1834.

== Recent discoveries ==
In May 2019, Kent Archaeological Field School uncovered a 150 by 50 ft (46 by 15 m) Roman building at Abbey Farm. According to the Dr. Paul Wilkinson, the building contained broken stone walls covering huge amounts of box flue tiles, which were used to direct hot air up the indoor walls, glazed terracotta floors, an untouched underfloor with hypocaust heating and tons of ceramic roof tiles. Although the plaster painted from these walls were mostly white, plaster walls coloured with green, red and yellow panels were found in the hot sauna room on the north side of the building.

== Kent and London ==
As London developed over time, especially during the 19th century, it expanded into north-west Kent. Settlements in this area became urbanised and increasingly regarded as suburbs of London. This view became stronger as local government areas in the region were created that were more closely aligned with London than with Kent.

An administrative area known as the County of London was created by the Local Government Act 1888. The new county incorporated part of north west Kent including Deptford, Greenwich, Woolwich and Lewisham. Penge was gained from Surrey by the London Government Act 1899.

The London Government Act 1963 created an enlarged Greater London in 1965 which took in more of northwest Kent. The Local Government Act 1972 abolished the previous structure of local government in 1974 and created a new non-metropolitan county of Kent, divided into districts. It also abolished Canterbury as a county borough which became a district under the new county council. The places that had been removed in 1888 were amalgamated to form the London Borough of Lewisham and the Royal Borough of Greenwich and two further boroughs were created. These were the London Borough of Bromley, an amalgamation of Bromley, Beckenham, Chislehurst, Orpington and Penge and the London Borough of Bexley comprising Bexley, Sidcup, Erith and Crayford.

== Modern Kent ==
Much of the Battle of Britain during World War II was fought in the skies over the county, and between June 1944 and March 1945, over 10,000 V1 flying bombs, or Doodlebugs, were fired on London from bases in Northern France. Many were destroyed by aircraft, anti-aircraft guns or barrage balloons, but around 2500 fell on the capital - but almost the same number fell in Kent, and the area became known as Doodlebug Alley. The town of Deal was also the target for a 1989 attack by the IRA.

Much of the north-west of the county is part of the London commuter belt. The Thames Gateway regeneration area includes riverside areas of north Kent as far east as Sittingbourne and largely to the north of the A2 road. Much of Kent, especially the Medway area, saw post-war migration from London. This was partly because of the heavy damage and destruction sustained by London in World War II.

In 1998, Rochester, Chatham, Gillingham and Rainham left the administrative county of Kent to form the Unitary Authority of Medway, but remain in the ceremonial county of Kent.

The two cities in Kent were Canterbury, the seat of the Archbishop of Canterbury, and Rochester, the seat of the Bishop of Rochester. However, since 1998 when local government was reorganised, Rochester lost its official city status, thought at the time to be through an administrative oversight. In 2018, it was reported that the loss of city status was not accidental.

== Men of Kent and Kentish Men ==
Kent is traditionally divided into East Kent and West Kent and such a division can be traced back at least as far as the Anglo-Saxon Kingdom of Kent. Those from the East are known as Men of Kent (or Maids of Kent) and those from the West as Kentish Men (or Kentish Maids).

=== Iron Age and Roman Period ===
Julius Caesar called Kent, Cantium, and the pre-Roman local tribe the Cantiaci subsequently become a civitas (unit of local administration) of Roman Britain, based at Durovernum Cantiacorum (modern Canterbury). The Germanic settlers adopted the Romano-British name of Cantium and this lends weight to the idea that civitas passed from British to Germanic (Jutish) hands with its structure essentially intact. The civitas territory may only have consisted of East Kent so the origins of the sub-divisions of Kent may thus go back to the Iron Age.

=== Anglo-Saxon Period ===
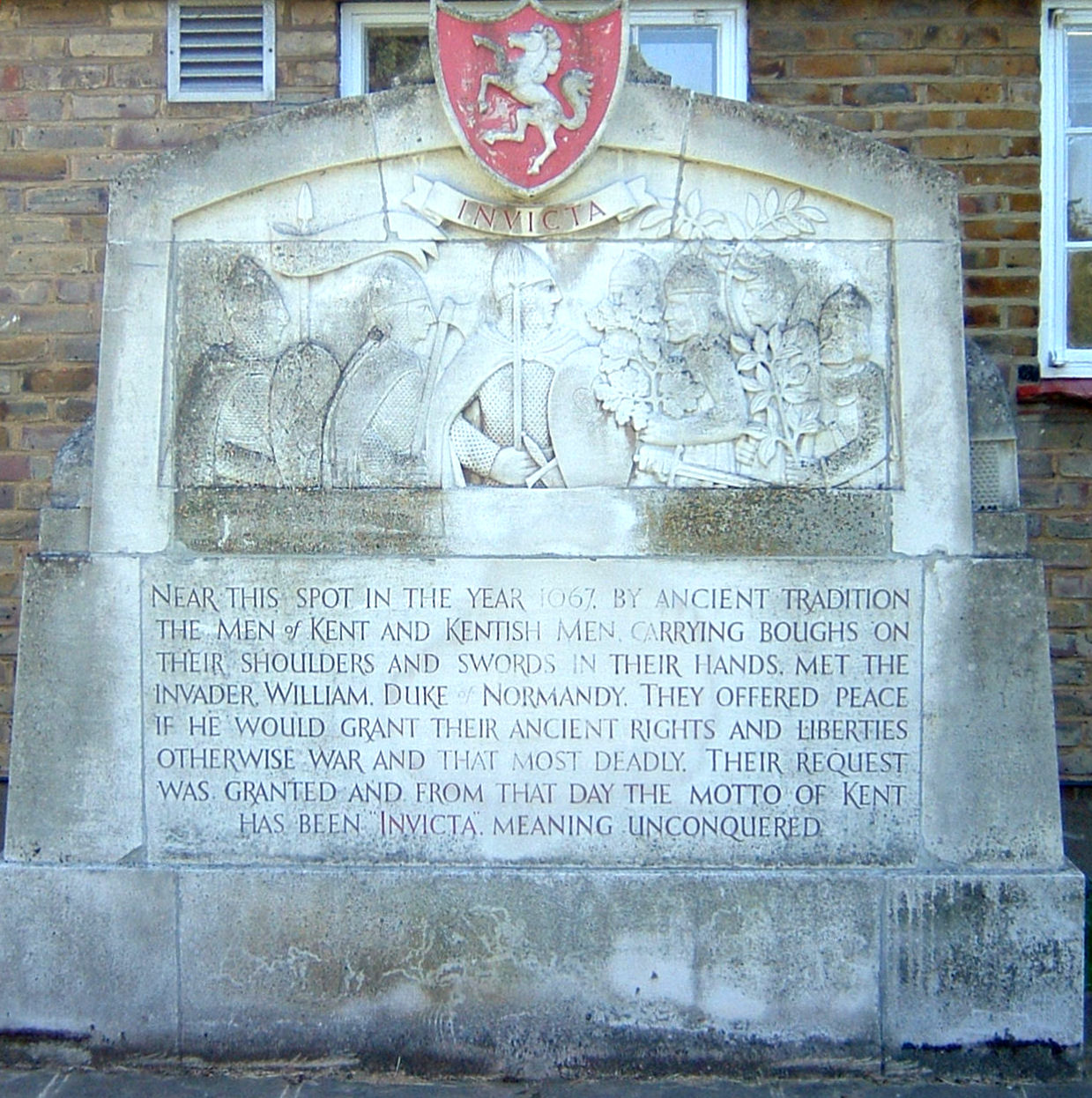
A stone monument in the town of Swanscombe, erected in 1958, claims that both the Kentish Men & Men of Kent met with Duke William and agreed that they could keep their ancient rights and liberties.

The East and West Kentish identities date back at least as far as the Anglo-Saxon period. In the early days of the English church it was usual for kingdoms, even large ones like Mercia and Northumbria, to be served by just one diocese, but Kent was unique in having two, Rochester in the west, and Canterbury in the east.

This seems to have reflected political divisions with eastern and western political units in place at that time. In the late 7th century, Kent is recorded as being under the control of co-Kings, one in the west (Swaefherd, of the East Saxon royal house) and one in the east – both of these being under the overlordship of Aethelred of Mercia.

These political divisions may reflect the varying ethnic make-up of the leadership of Kent at that time, the difference being between the Jutes who settled in the east and south of the county shortly after the Roman armies' departure early in the 5th century and the Angles and Saxon who may have settled in the west of the county slightly later, or simply a divided, decentralized Jutish kingdom. Modern DNA testing suggests the people of Kent have a greater genetic affinity with each other than persons from other counties in England.

F. F. Smith's 1929 work A History of Rochester quotes a 1735 glossary by the Rev. Samuel Pegge on the subject:

A Man of Kent and a Kentish Man is an expression often used but the explanation has been given in various ways. Some say that a Man of Kent is a term of high honour while a Kentish Man denotes but an ordinary person. Others contend that men born in Kent east of the River Medway are Men of Kent while those born west of the river are Kentish Men. The division's origins are obscure but may derive from the ethnic differences between the Jutes who settled in the east and south of the county shortly after the Roman armies' departure early in the 5th century and the Angles and Saxon who settled in the west of the county slightly later. Although of similar descent from the Germanic area of Europe to the Angles and Saxons, the Kentish Jutes regarded themselves as a separate kingdom with their own laws and customs, calling themselves Kentings, believing that they were the real Men of Kent and retaining many of their customs until quite late into the Middle Ages. They were responsible for introducing the system of inheritance known as gavelkind, whereby all descendants of a deceased person shared the property and belongings equally. In Saxon law, the eldest child inherited.

The history of early Anglo-Saxon England is very uncertain and prone to re-interpretation according to the fashion of the time. A Jutish elite may have formed their kingdom in the east, expelling or absorbing rival tribes and Jutish kings settling the land with their own followers until the kingdom reached its traditional borders, as was customary across Britain during the initial Anglo-Saxon invasions and settlement. Whatever the case, Jutish cultural influence was evident across the whole county by the Norman period.

According to the BBC website, legend holds that a few hundred years later, it is said the Men of Kent resisted William the Conqueror more stoutly than the Kentish Men, who surrendered.

=== Boundaries and usage ===
Kent is traditionally divided into East Kent and West Kent by the River Medway. However, some towns, such as the Medway Towns – Rochester, Chatham and Gillingham (although Rainham was annexed from Swale, and is thus considered part of East Kent) and Maidstone – lie on the east / south bank of the river.

The historic area of West Kent included a number of places now in Greater London; specifically the London Boroughs of Bexley, Bromley, Greenwich and Lewisham. This included locations such as Sidcup, Orpington, and Greenwich.

Further investigation also shows that the division is not, in fact, the river Medway, but lies further east in Gillingham, or, more precisely, at Rainham. Along the London road at Rainham is a small hamlet, now part of the town itself, known as Rainham Mark. Here once stood an ancient boundary stone, near The Hops and Vine public house – formerly The Belisha Beacon – and since replaced by a milestone that, traditionally, marks the division of Kent into its eastern and western zones. Edward Hasted, in his 1798 description of Rainham, writes:

The whole of this parish is in the division of East Kent which begins here, the adjoining parish of Gillingham, westward, being wholly in that of West Kent.

According to one local historian, Freddie Cooper, a former Mayor of Gillingham, this division remained in force until 1 April 1929 when Rainham was transferred, despite protest, from the administration of Milton Rural District Council to that of Gillingham.

F. F. Smith's 1929 work A History of Rochester quotes a 1735 glossary by the Rev. Samuel Pegge on the subject:

A Man of Kent and a Kentish Man is an expression often used but the explanation has been given in various ways. Some say that a Man of Kent is a term of high honour while a Kentish Man denotes but an ordinary person. Others contend that the men of west Kent are Men of Kent while those of East Kent are only Kentish Men.

One example of this traditional subdivision are Kent's two historic local regiments, the Queen's Own Royal West Kent Regiment and the Buffs (Royal East Kent Regiment), now both part of the Princess of Wales' Royal Regiment. Another is its two historical parliamentary constituencies, West Kent and East Kent. West Kent and East Kent each had their own Quarter Sessions until 1814, when the separate administrations of East and West Kent were merged. The West Kent Quarter Sessions Division was based in Maidstone and consisted of the Lathe of Aylesford, the Lathe of Sutton-at-Hone, and the lower division of the Lathe of Scray. The East Kent Quarter Session, corresponding roughly to the Diocese of Canterbury, consisted of the three lathes: Lathe of St Augustine, Lathe of Shepway, and the upper division of the Lathe of Scray. The distinction between these two-halves of the county is perpetuated in the present-day by the Association of the Men of Kent and Kentish Men, an organisation formed in 1913.

== Nickname ==
Most English counties have nicknames for people from that county, such as a Tyke from Yorkshire and a Yellowbelly from Lincolnshire; the traditional nickname for people from Kent is "Kentish Long-Tail", deriving from the long-held belief on the continental mainland of Medieval Europe that the English had tails.
