= History of Folkestone =

Coordinates: 51.08°N 1.16°E

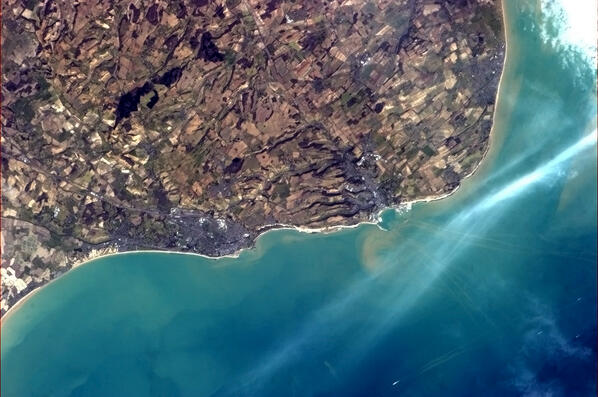
Folkestone and Dover from the International Space Station

The history of Folkestone stretches back to ancient times, with evidence of human habitation dating to the Mesolithic and Paleolithic ages over 12,000 years ago. Its close proximity to the Continent means that it has often been a point of transit for migrating peoples. The area has successively been occupied by groups of Britons, Romans and Saxons. During the Iron Age, a large oppidum and quern-stone workshop were situated on the eastern headlands of the bay. By the Roman era, it had been transformed into a large Roman Villa overlooking the sea.

During the Anglo-Saxon period, Folkestone was part of the Kingdom of Kent. After the Norman Invasion, a Norman knight held the Barony of Folkestone, by which time the settlement had become a fishing village. In the 13th century, it became part of the Cinque Ports, and had the privileges of a wealthy trading port. By the start of the Tudor period it had become a town in its own right. Wars with France meant that defences had to be built here; and plans for Folkestone Harbour were made. At the beginning of the 18th century, the harbour finally became a reality, and Folkestone, like most settlements on the south coast, became involved in smuggling. However, it was the coming of the railways in mid-19th century that were the making of the town's prosperity: with it came the tourist trade, and the two industries, port and seaside resort, benefited the town until changes in tourist opportunities in the mid 20th century brought about its present somewhat depleted fortunes.

== Prehistory ==
Folkestone's history has been shaped by its location within the natural landscape. It sits near the North Downs Trackway, which provided a natural track from the narrowest part of the English Channel to the important religious complexes at Avebury and Stonehenge in Wiltshire, where it is known as the Harroway. The entire area around Folkestone sits on a thick band of gault clay overlying the Lower Greensand which forms the underlying structure of southeast Britain. The greensand was laid down during the Lower Cretaceous period, and is rich in ichnofauna. The exposed greensand at Folkestone is a unique feature of the area, and is referred to as the Folkestone Formation or the Folkestone Beds. Unfortunately for historians and archaeologists alike, the greensand stone is loose unconsolidated sandstone, and the gault clay is nearly liquid at the point where it meets the greenstone, so that there may have been significant erosion and possible loss of prehistoric sites over the years. It is estimated that the cliffs at Folkestone have eroded by around 400–500 metres since Roman times, and that cliffs are crumbling at a rate of 6 inches (15 cm0) per year.

=== The Upper Palaeolithic, Mesolithic and Neolithic 10,000 BC – 2000 BC ===
While the nature of the cliffs in Folkestone means that much archaeological evidence has been lost to the sea, evidence has been found that points to settlement in the area as far back as 8000 BC, during the Neolithic era. During excavations at the Folkestone Roman Villa site in 2010, archaeologists discovered worked flints dating to the period, establishing proof of human presence in Folkestone at that time. Tools dating to the Palaeolithic have also been discovered at the Bayle in Folkestone, and there is evidence of a palaeolithic settlement at nearby Castle Hill (also known as Caesar's Encampment, though there is no evidence of Roman activity at this site).

=== The Bronze Age and Iron Age ===
On the outskirts of Folkestone, an important Bronze Age site was found at Holywell Coombe between 1987 and 1988, in advance of the building of the Channel Tunnel. Findings included roundhouses, fields, trackways, and pottery fragments.

During the Iron Age, an extensive pre-Roman native settlement existed on the eastern headland of the bay, at what has come to be known as the East Wear Bay Site, or the Roman Villa Site. Beneath the remains of the Roman era villa lie the remains of a much older Iron Age oppidum that also served as a quern-stone production center. Quern-stones, or stones used to grind cereals into flour, were produced here on almost an industrial scale, using the local greensand stone from the Folkestone formation. Over 200 querns have been recovered from the site, and most of them appear to have been discarded at some point during the process of production. Many have partially worked surfaces, or appear to have cracked during the hole boring stage. In addition to the numerous broken or unfinished querns, a layer of the excavation strata at the Villa/opidum site is entirely composed of greensand dust, which is almost certainly stone-working debris, suggesting that this was the location of the Iron Age era quern workshop.

Folkestone querns have been found in numerous other archaeological excavations throughout the greater Kent area and beyond, suggesting that the Iron Age residents had widespread trading connections. Querns have been found in local Kentish sites such as Wingham, and Dosset Court in Upper Deal, as well as more distant locations such as Hunbury (Northants), London, Essex, and possibly France. Archaeological evidence suggests that in return for the querns, the inhabitants received fine pottery from Gaul and wine from Italy.

== Roman Folkestone ==
=== Roman Folkestone ===
Evidence of trade between Roman Gaul and the wealthy community at Folkestone suggests that they were on good terms with the Romans in the years before the Roman occupation. However, the town is not mentioned in any documents of the period, probably since a Roman road did not end here. A 1st century cemetery was discovered in 1948 at Cheriton on the outskirts of modern Folkestone, and contained both British and Roman remains. Tiles stamped "Classis Britannica" have also been found at the Roman villa site, suggesting that the villa may have had some sort of connection to Roman navy in Britain.

=== Folkestone Roman villa ===
After the Romans conquered Britain, a large Roman villa was built over the older Iron Age oppidum. The first version of the Folkestone Roman Villa was built c. 75 AD, and consisted of one block built of tufa stone, with slate and ironstone foundations. Archeological evidence suggests that the villa may have been damaged by fire, but it was rebuilt in the second century on a more luxurious scale, this time using quarried and dressed greensand stone. It was built to roughly the same plan, but was enlarged with more rooms and corridors, an expanded Roman Bath suite, and more luxurious finishing such as hypocausts, mosaic floors, and painted walls. The main entertaining room of the villa, no. 40, would have had views overlooking the courtyard and the over the cliffs to the sea. A second block was also built at this time, and also contained a bathing suite, kitchens, and a very large hypocaust. It was abandoned for unknown reasons in the 3rd or 4th century.

== Post-Roman and Early Medieval ==
As 'Folcanstan' the town first appears in the 7th century, possibly named for its use as the meeting place ('–stone') of someone called Folca. Its recorded history may be viewed as beginning in this period due to the founding, in 630AD, of Folkestone Priory on the West Cliff at Folkestone by King Eadbald of Kent for his daughter Eanswythe (later canonised as St. Eanswythe) and her nuns. This is believed to have been the first Christian community for women in England. Her name lends itself to the parish church of St Mary and St Eanswythe where her mortal remains are believed to be interred. At the same time the King caused a fort to be built alongside. All evidence of both structures have since been destroyed either by sea or attack. As a result, fishermen and farmers began to settle in the valley, although there was still little more than a tiny hamlet on the banks of the river and on the seashore. The town seal shows the saint with two fishes to record this.

== Middle Ages ==
By 1066 the manor of Folkestone was in the ownership of the church at Canterbury. In 1052 Earl Godwin of Wessex had attacked all the coastal towns, and the area was thought important enough for a Norman to own it. After William I became king he took the barony and made a gift of it to his half-brother Bishop Odo. By 1086, the year of Domesday the barony was held by William D'Arcy. It was given a value of £100 and consisted of about 6,240 acres (25.3 km^{2}), 5 churches, about 600 people of whom 209 were villains and 83 bondsmen.

In 1095 the lord of the manor was Nigel de Muneville: he built a new church in the town to replace that which was destroyed by Earl Godwin and established Folkestone Priory for Benedictine Monks close to the nunnery site. In 1138 a new church and priory were again built, this time by William D'Averanches and dedicated to St. Mary and St. Eanswythe.

The French took an opportunity to attack Folkestone in 1216 and laid waste to much of the settlement which, although still a village in size, was significant enough to have a Mayor and a Corporation. In 1313 Folkestone received a charter as a Corporate Limb of the Cinque port of Dover, and was thus obliged to supply seven boats. Trade began through the port, especially of wool, but also of luxury goods such as wines and cloth.

== 16th/17th centuries ==
The Tudor period again saw fears of French invasion, and coastal defences were strengthened. Gun sites were prepared on the Bayle headland. During the reign of Queen Elizabeth I Folkestone contained about 120 houses. Folkestone Manor was one of the most prosperous in Kent. In 1545 the Town Council was again enlarged; and harbour plans, to replace the ancient Stade where boats had been landing, were drawn up in 1629, although they came to nothing.

At this time, too, the Free School, for poor boys, was established in 1684, by William Harvey's legacy; it was later to become Harvey Grammar School. A Guildhall was also built. By 1700 the town was expanding away from the beach area, up on to the hills on either side of the stream valley, although there were still pastures and orchards in the valley.

In 1794 the War Office purchased over 229 acres (930,000 m^{2}) of open land at Shorncliffe, to the west of Folkestone. Here the Shorncliffe Redoubt was built; in 1796 the Garrison was further extended with the provision of barracks for housing troops, originally being sent off to the Peninsula Wars, were stationed there. In 1804 the original wooden barracks were replaced with buildings of stone construction and were used to house cavalry and artillery brigades. Subsequent wars have seen many thousands of troops here: the present Sir John Moore Barracks is the home of Gurkha Regiment in Britain.

== 18th/19th centuries ==
The beginning of this period coincided with smuggling which was rife throughout the South Coast of England. Local people were generally favourably inclined towards them, and Folkestone dwellers were no exception. The main storage area for smuggled goods was The Warren, to the east of the town. Later in the 19th century, Folkestone Harbour become a reality; and the coming of the railways heralded the start of a new industry to the town: that of tourism, although this was to be relatively much later than its neighbours of Margate, Ramsgate and Broadstairs. Most of the facilities expected of a seaside resort - a pleasure pier, a bathing establishment and theatres - only appeared after the 1880s.

== 20th century ==
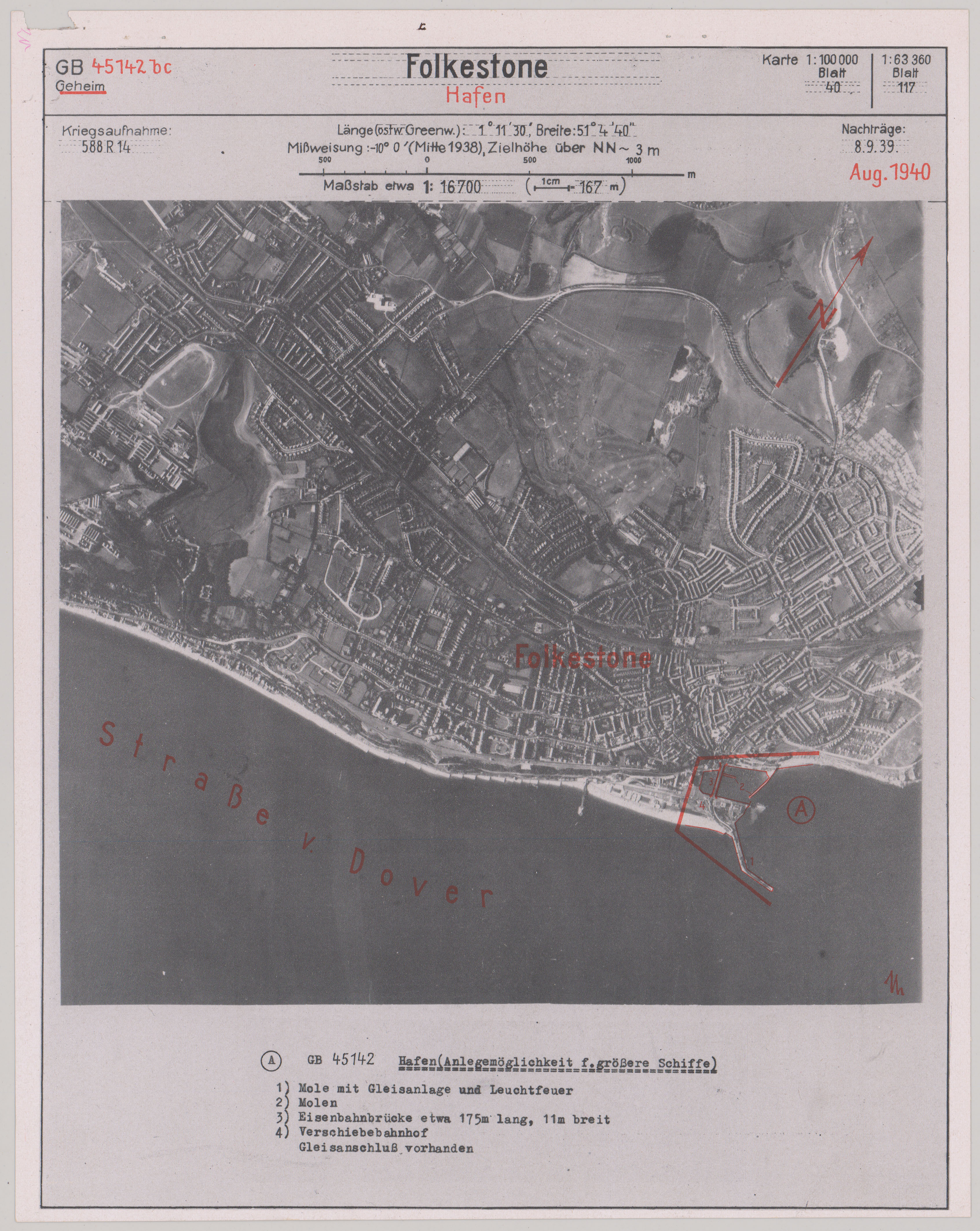
Folkestone on a target dossier of the German Luftwaffe, 1939

In the First World War the town became host to some 65,000 Belgian refugees fleeing the conflict. Shorncliffe Camp served as a training camp for thousands of recruits in training, and the port was the main embarkation point for soldiers leaving to fight in the trenches of France and Belgium. Whole blocks of houses, hotels and other buildings were commandeered for the hundreds of thousands of soldiers, including many Canadian troops. They marched through the town to the harbour along the route now called the "Road of Remembrance".

In general, little serious damage was done to Folkestone during World War I, although on 25 May 1917 low cloud over London caused a 21 strong wave of Gotha bombers to abort a raid on the capital. The Luftstreitkräfte aircraft turned for home and detached their bombs mainly in the Folkestone district, killing 71 people and injuring 94 more.

After the war a good deal of refurbishment was required: requisitioned buildings had to be made ready for holidaymakers. New buildings to attract them were built: the Marina and new pleasure gardens were established, and the Marine Pavilion built. But this was not to last for long, for much worse befell the town in World War II.

At the very beginning of that war thousands of school children were evacuated to the town, but were soon sent elsewhere in 1940. Within a few weeks Folkestone became a prohibited area and 35,000 residents left. Defences around the town were set up: tank traps, barbed wire surrounded it, and gun batteries set upon the heights. In this war the town was under constant attack: bombs and shelling (from across the Channel) and later flying bombs caused immense damage, and Folkestone was to be changed forever. Casualties were high: 123 people were killed, and 778 injured. 550 houses had been destroyed, 14,441 properties damaged. 28 people were killed by shelling, with 219 shells

It took almost twenty years before Folkestone was again to become a holiday resort.

In July 1967 an attempt was made to retrieve the cargo of the Kielce, a Polish munitions ship that had sunk in 1946 off Folkestone. During preliminary work, the ordnance in the vessel's hold exploded with force equivalent to an earthquake measuring 4.5 on the Richter scale, digging a six-metre deep crater in the seabed and causing panic in Folkestone, although no-one was injured.
