= Folkestone Downs =

Chalk hills in Kent, England

Coordinates: 51°6′N 1°9′E

The Folkestone Downs are an area of chalk downland above Folkestone, where the eastern end of the North Downs escarpment meets the English Channel. Part of the Downs is the Folkestone to Etchinghill Escarpment Site of Special Scientific Interest, designated for its geological and biological interest.

== Topography ==
Folkestone Downs stretch for 5 kilometres from East Cliff and Warren Country Park in the east to Peene Quarry in the west. The downs rise steeply above the town of Folkestone to heights in excess of 150 metres. The highest point is Dover Hill at 170 metres. The Channel Tunnel Terminal lies at the foot of the downs and the British portal is directly below the slopes of Castle Hill. The downland is classified as CG4 Brachypodium pinnatum and CG5 Bromus erectus - Brachypodium pinnatum calcareous grassland with smaller areas of CG2 Festuca ovina - Avenula pratensis grassland. There are also areas of scrubland and woodland.

== Ecology ==
=== Flora ===
Folkestone Downs is one of the largest areas of unimproved chalk downland in Kent. The extensive flora includes many typical species found in chalk grassland including horseshoe vetch (Hippocrepis comosa), squinancywort (Asperula cynanchica) and small scabious, as well as scarce species such as bedstraw broomrape (Orobanche caryophyllacea). Many species of orchid grow on the downs notably the nationally rare late spider orchid (Ophrys fuciflora), as well as the nationally scarce early spider orchid (Ophrys sphegodes) and man orchid (Aceras anthropophorum). The nationally scarce burnt orchid (Neotinea ustulata) has also been recorded in the past. Folkestone Downs is also notable for its extensive lichen flora.

=== Fauna ===
The scrub and woodland provide breeding habitats for many species of birds. Folkestone Downs is particularly notable for its insect fauna. Up to 32 species of butterfly have been recorded on the downs including the Adonis blue (Lysandra bellargus), chalkhill blue (Polyommatus coridon) and small blue (Cupido minimus). Several rare species of moth have been recorded including the straw belle (Aspitates gilvaria) and the annulet moth (Charissa obscurata).

== Ownership, management and access ==
Much of Folkestone Downs is owned by Eurotunnel and managed by the White Cliffs Countryside Project. Grazing was abandoned after the Second World War resulting in an invasion of coarse grasses and scrub. This resulted in a reduction of the grassland flora, particularly after the rabbit population was reduced by myxamatosis in the 1950s. Cattle grazing was resumed in 1990. Much of the downland is designated as open access land following the Countryside and Rights of Way Act 2000.
