= Folkestone Roman Villa =

Roman villa in Kent, England

Coordinates: 51.0887°N 1.1985°E

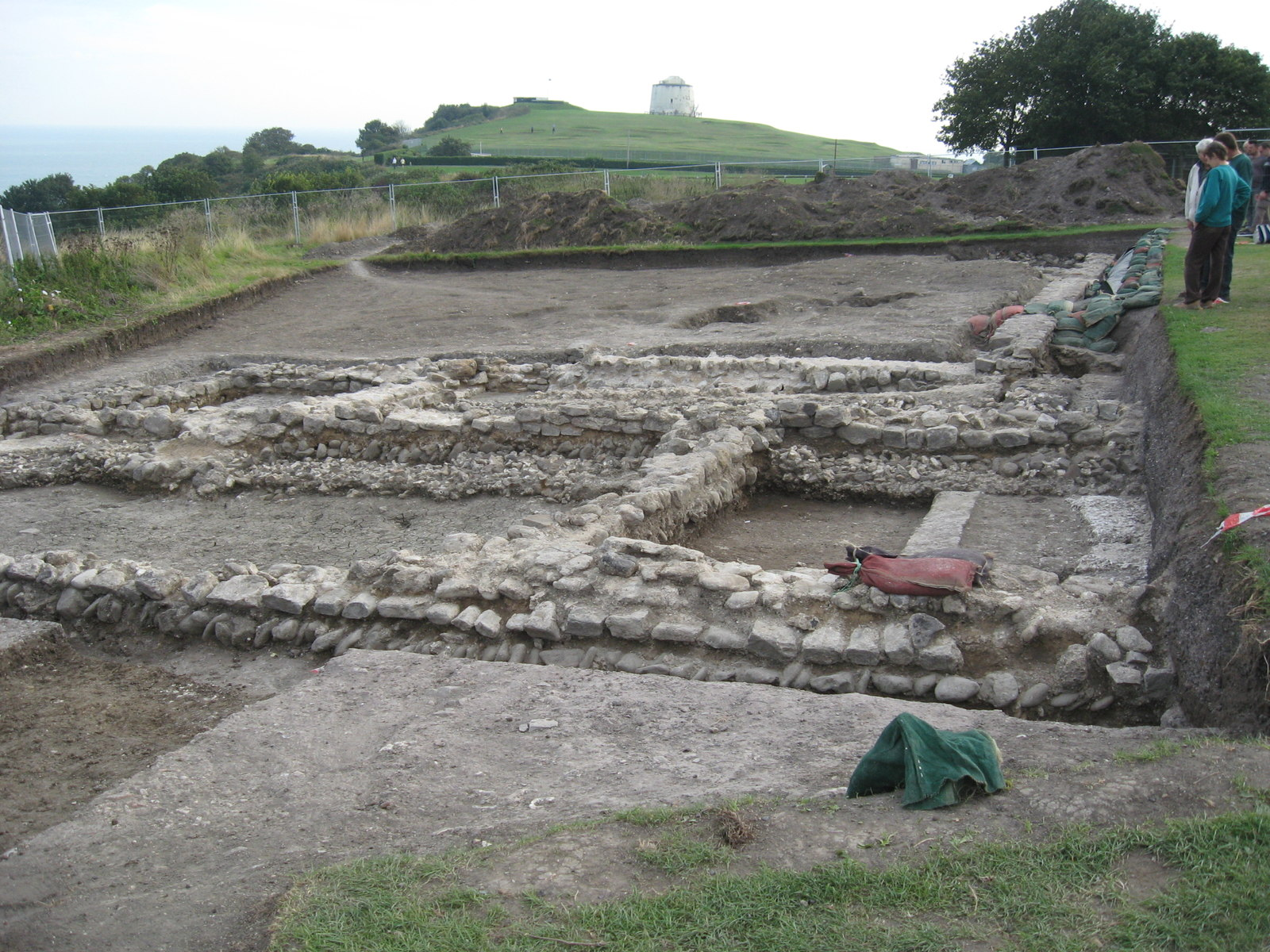
The villa remains

Folkestone Roman Villa, also referred to as the East Bay Site, is a villa built during the Roman Occupation of Britain, and is located in East Wear Bay near the port town of Folkestone, in Kent, England. The villa is situated on a cliff top overlooking the English Channel, with views of the French coast at Boulogne on a clear day. It is situated near the start of the North Downs Trackway, and the area has been inhabited for thousands of years, with archeological finds in the area and at the villa site dating back to the Mesolithic and Neolithic ages. The villa was built around A. D. 75, and was almost certainly built within the confines of a preexisting Iron Age settlement.

The villa was rebuilt and expanded in probably the second century A. D., this time as a more substantial structure with mosaics, a bath-house, and a second block, possibly connected by a courtyard. The villa was abandoned sometime in the third century, though archeological evidence suggests that it was briefly reoccupied in the fourth century.

== Geology of the site ==
The Roman villa and earlier Iron Age workshop are located on the head of a low, slumped cliff, overlooking a shingle beach. The cliff here is composed of a band of gault clay that is nearly 100 feet thick, which overlies the Lower Greensand stone formation. The greensand is not actually sand: it is a loose, unconsolidated sandstone bed that forms part of the underlying structure of southeast England. The exposed greensand at Folkestone, referred to as the Folkestone Formation or the Folkestone Beds, is a unique geological feature of the area, and is rich with fossils and ichnofauna. The formation extends about 5 miles to the northwest of Folkestone to town of Stanford. At the junction where the gault meets the greensand, the gault is nearly liquid, resulting is major erosion and landslides over the years. This erosion has threatened to destroy the villa site, which was another 400 – 500 meters from the sea during Roman times, but which now sits near the edge of the cliff. The site is crumbling into the sea at about a rate of 6 inches per year. Numerous rescue excavations have been undertaken over the years, as archeologists race to rescue the site from slow destruction.

== History ==
=== Mesolithic to Neolithic: c. 10,000 BC – c. 2000 BC ===
Scattered evidence of human habitation near the Villa site has been uncovered during archeological digs, suggesting that the area was lived in or traveled through since Mesolithic times. In 2010, excavators uncovered Mesolithic worked flints below the Roman villa site. Although these flints probably originated from a nearby location and were washed into the villa site, they do establish human presence in the area during the Mesolithic period. Tools dating to the Neolithic period have been discovered at the Bayle in Folkestone, and there is some evidence to suggest that there was a Neolithic settlement at nearby Castle Hill (sometimes known as Caesar's Encampment, though there is no evidence or Roman activity at this site).

=== Bronze and Iron Age settlements ===
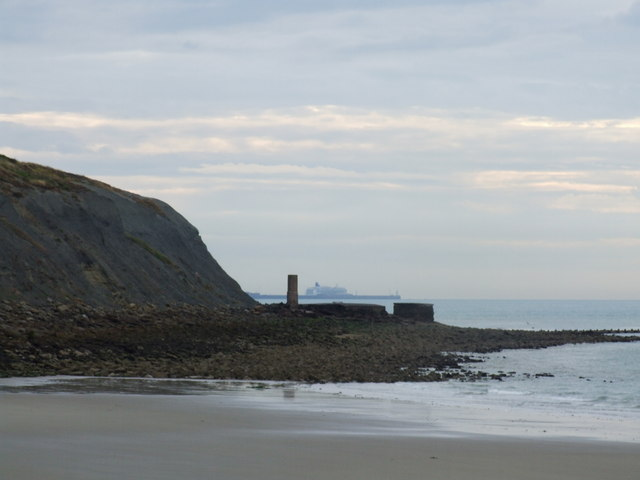
Copt Point, the likely source for greensand boulders utilized in quern production

On the outskirts of Folkestone, an important early Bronze Age settlement was discovered at Holywell Coombe in 1987 and 1988 during archeological excavations in advance of the construction of the Channel Tunnel. Findings included "round houses", fields, trackways, and pottery fragments.

During the Iron Age, an extensive, pre-Roman native settlement occupied the eastern headland of the bay, on what has come to be known as the East Bay Site, or Roman Villa Site. Beneath the remains of the Romano-British villa was probably an Iron Age oppidum. Remains beneath the Roman villa suggest that querns, or stones used to grind cereal crops into flour, were produced here during the Iron Age on an almost industrial scale. Over 60 quern-stones have been recovered from the site of the villa and the lower cliff area. The querns are made of the local greensand stone, most likely collected or cut from nearby Copt Point and taken to the headland to be worked. The majority of the found querns are unfinished, with partially worked surfaces, or incomplete hoppers and spindle holes. In many cases, the querns appear to have been damages and discarded, many seeming to have fractured during the hole boring stage. In addition to the numerous broken or unfinished querns, a layer of the excavation strata at the Villa/oppidum site is entirely composed of greensand dust, which is almost certainly stone-working debris, suggesting that this was the location of the Iron Age quern workshop.

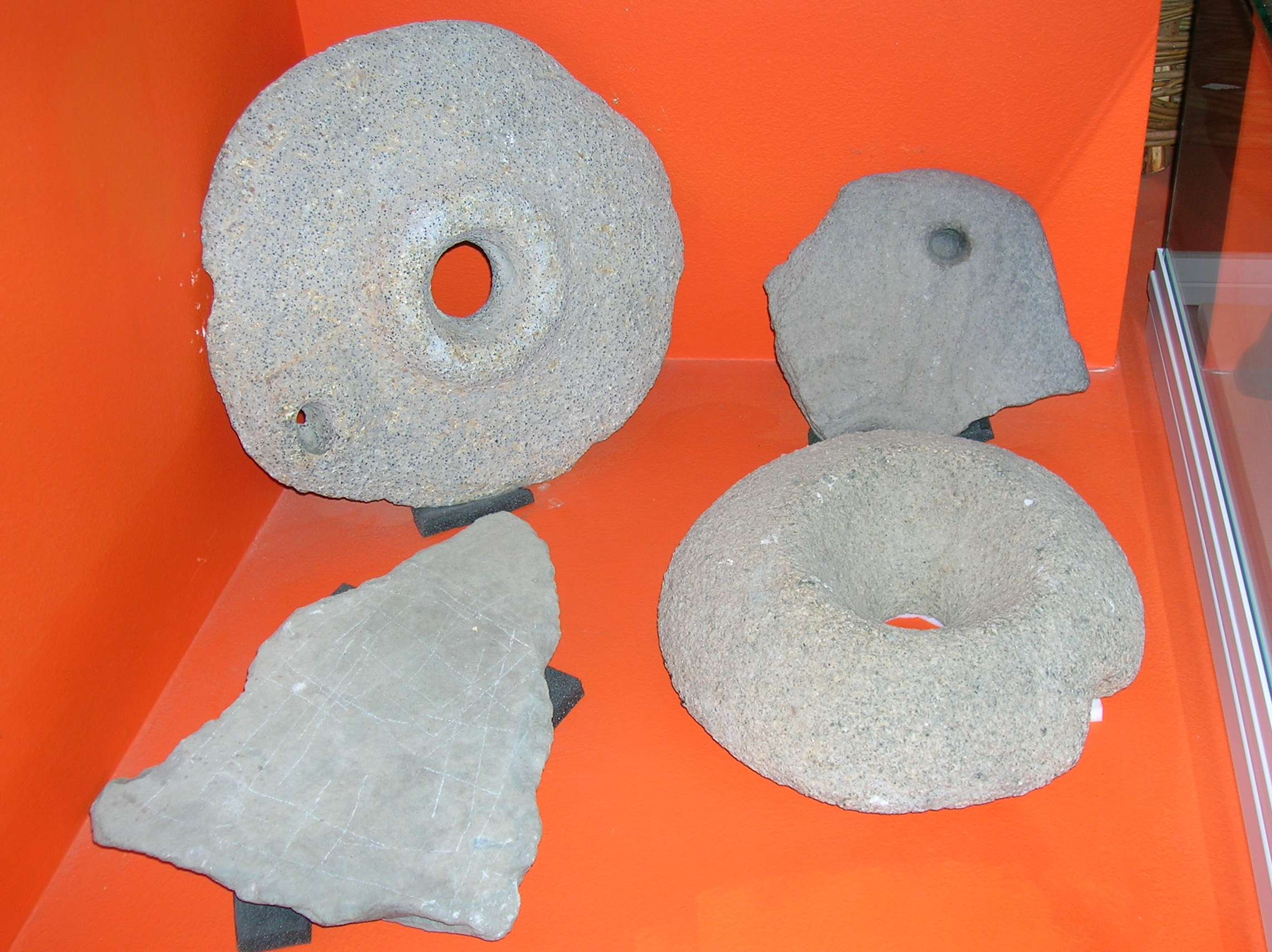
Scottish quern-stones, similar to the querns found at Folkestone

Querns constructed of Folkestone greensand have been found in numerous other archeological excavations, including local Kentish sites such as Wingham and Dosset Court in Upper Deal, as well as more distant sites such as Hunsbury Nortants, London, Essex, and possibly France. Archeological evidence suggests that in return for the querns, fine pottery from Gaul and wine from Italy were imported through the bay.

=== The Roman Era ===
Evidence of trade between Roman Gaul and the wealthy community who lived at Folkestone, seems to suggest that they were on good terms with the Romans in the years before the Roman occupation, and that when the Roman Emperor Claudius invaded Britain in AD 43, his troops did not come ashore at Folkestone. By c. 75 AD, the Iron Age settlement had been replaced with a Roman villa. The first version of the villa to be built consisted only of block A, and was built of tufa blocks laid on foundations of flint and ironstone. Main rooms had opus signinum flooring, and were possibly painted with frescoes.

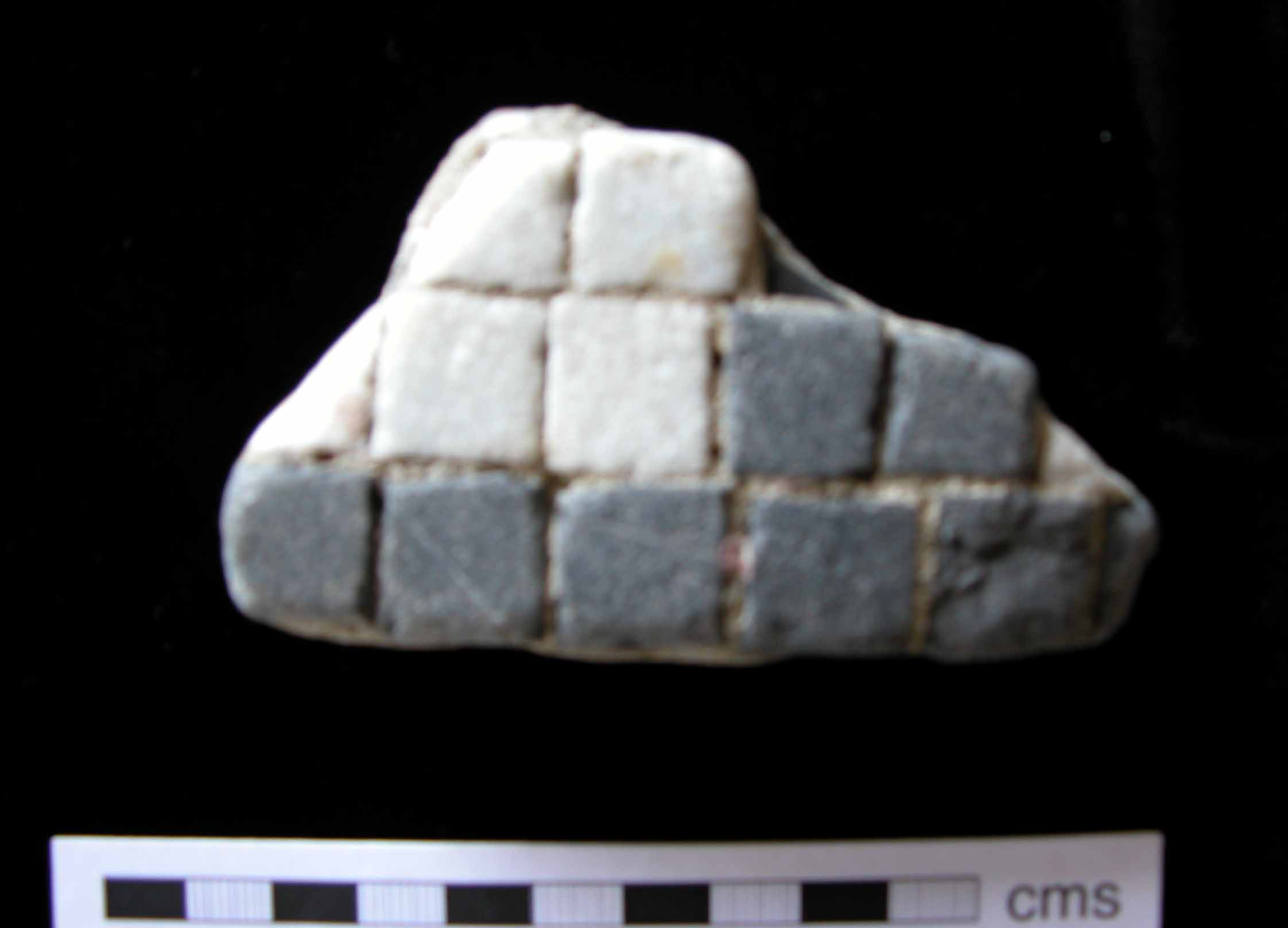
Mosaic fragment thought to originate from the villa at Folkestone

The villa was rebuilt sometime in the second century, and when S. E. Winbolt excavated room no. 41 in 1924, he found over 2 inches of burnt material beneath the flooring, suggesting that the villa may have been gutted by fire. This second villa was more luxurious, and was complete with mosaics, painted walls, a bath house, and underfloor heating. The villa was rebuilt in roughly the same plan as before, but with enlarged rooms and corridors, an enlarged bath suite, and the addition of more rooms. Instead of tufa blocks, it was rebuilt with quarried and faced greensand stone, and on footings of rounded sea-stones laid on the gault clay. Tufa blocks were taken from the old building, and in some cases used to build portions of Block B. In all, over 60 rooms have been discovered in three separate blocks.

Classis Britannica tiles found at the site indicate that the villa might have a connection to the Roman Navy in Britain, or that the villa was possibly some sort of signalling station. It is unclear who inhabited the villa, but such villas were high status, and would have been occupied by important or wealthy Romans or by the Romano-British elite.

For reasons that are unclear, the villa seems to have been abandoned sometime in the late third century. It was briefly reoccupied in the 4th century, before it was abandoned and buried under sediments.

== The Roman Villa ==
=== Block A Building ===
The Block A building is thought to be the earliest part of the villa built, although it was renovated or rebuilt at the time block B was constructed. Block A is around 212 feet long, and consists of two corridors, or verandahs, with wings at each end. The entrance to the villa was on the seaward side, and through the corridor into the best room in the villa, room no. 40. The rooms to the north and west of this are all furnished with hearths and fine flooring, and were probably the bedrooms of the villa.

The west end of the villa was probably the working end of the villa, and contained the furnace, bathing rooms, kitchen, and lavatorium. Room no. 28 was probably a kitchen, and a short passageway led to a lavatorium, or washing room, containing a big basin. A drain in the floor of the lavatorium probably led used water off to a drain in the south-west corner of the house. Adjacent to the kitchen suite was the bathing suite. Room no. 29 featured a hypocaust heating system, which probably had a caldarium, or hot plunge bath above it. The adjacent room no. 30 would have received indirect heat from the hypocaust, and was probably a tepidarium, and room no. 36 a cold plunge bath. The cold plunge bath was finished in concrete with an opus signinum floor, and would have been about 3 feet deep. Immediately adjacent to the bathing suite are the small rooms nos. 31–33, and were probably warming rooms or apodyterium. Three other rooms lay near the bath complex, but could not be excavated as they lay under a road.

In the center of the villa lay a suite of large rooms (nos. 40–42) that probably served as the main living and entertaining rooms of the house. The central room of the villa, no. 40, had a tessellated mosaic floor, and a magnificent view overlooking the courtyard and the sea, and is where the villa owner might have entertained guests. An earlier floor of opus signinum was discovered about 1 foot below the tessellated floor, indicating that the villa had been rebuilt and the flooring relaid at some point. Adjacent room no. 41 show significant evidence of being burnt, which may explain why the villa was renovated or rebuilt. Portions of older walls and flooring have been found beneath the rebuilt villa, and in room no. 41, there is a 2-inch thick layer of burnt material, suggesting that portions of the villa were gutted by fire.

=== Block B Building ===
Block B was built at the same time that Block A was renovated, and contains many similar features – hypocaust, Roman baths, a kitchen, and an especially large room warmed by the hypocaust are featured. The furthest edge of Block B was unfortunately already crumbling over the cliffside when Winbolt excavated in 1924.

== Excavation ==
The Roman Villa Site was known to inhabitants for many years before it was formally excavated. In the 18th century, the land was notoriously difficult to farm because of "old stones" which damaged farming equipment. In 1919, the curator of the Folkestone Museum, Mr. Browne Anderson, dug a preliminary trench at the site, but it wasn't until 1924 that the site was fully excavated by S. E. Winbolt. The site was open to the public, and was a popular tourist and national heritage attraction, until the onset of World War II. During the war, the site formed part of a series of gun emplacements along the cliffs, and was closed to the public (When archeologists excavated in 2010, they observed tank tracks across the Roman walls). The site reopened to the public in 1945, but continued to deteriorate. With funds for restoration or protection lacking due to post-war austerity measures, the decision was reluctantly made by the then Corporation of Folkestone to recover the site with clinker from the nearby municipal incineration unit.

It was not until 1989 that the site was re-excavated as a joint venture between the Kent Archeological Unit and Folkestone and Hythe District Council. The site was mainly a rescue mission, to locate the villa remains, determine the condition of the surviving Roman masonry, and ascertain how much of the villa had fallen over the cliff since 1924. The excavation took place over the summer of 1989. Some repairs were made to the villa during this excavation before the villa was recovered with backfill for the winter.

The site was excavated again from 2010–2011, as part of the three year "A Town Unearthed: Folkestone Before 1500" project. It was organized by Canterbury Christ Church University, the Folkestone People's History Centre and Canterbury Archaeological Trust. It was awarded £300,000 from the Heritage Lottery Trust, and was additionally funded by the Roger De Haan Charitable Trust, the Folkestone Town Council, the Kent Archaeological Society and the Folkestone and Hythe District Council. The excavation eventually won the "Rescue Dig of the Year" award by Current Archaeology magazine.
