= Cheriton Hill =

Hill in Kent, England

Coordinates: 51.11356°N 1.13751°E

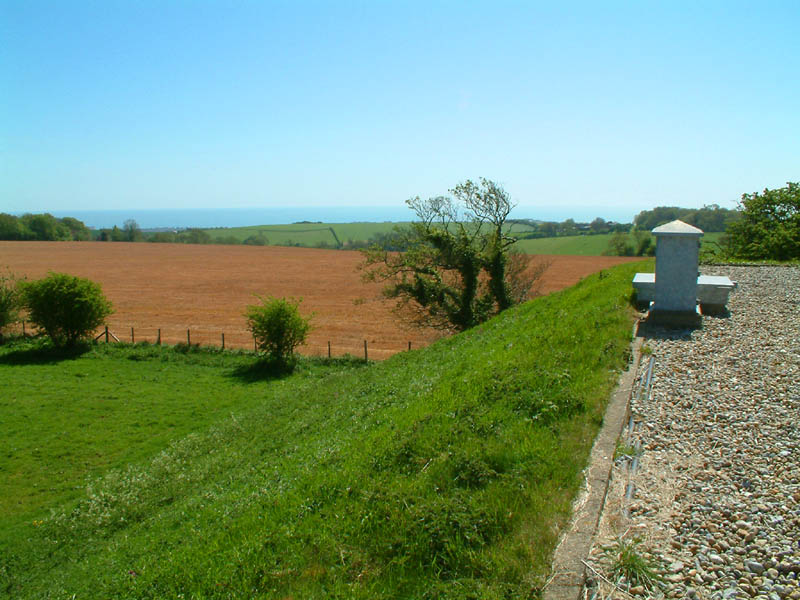
- The English Channel from the covered reservoir on Cheriton Hill

Highest point
- Elevation: 188 m (617 ft)
- Prominence: 150 m (490 ft)
- Parent peak: Crowborough
- Listing: Marilyn

Geography
- Location: North Downs, England
- OS grid: TR197396
- Topo map: OS Landrangers 179, 189

Cheriton Hill is a hill overlooking the English Channel near Folkestone in the south-east corner of Kent, England. The relatively low-lying hill (reaching only 188 metres above sea level) is covered with farmland, villages, narrow lanes, and footpaths. The highest point is on a covered reservoir next to the trig point; the highest natural point is nearby, probably close to the road to the village of Paddlesworth, near a transmitter mast, but the relatively flat summit gives no real impression of being on top of a hill.

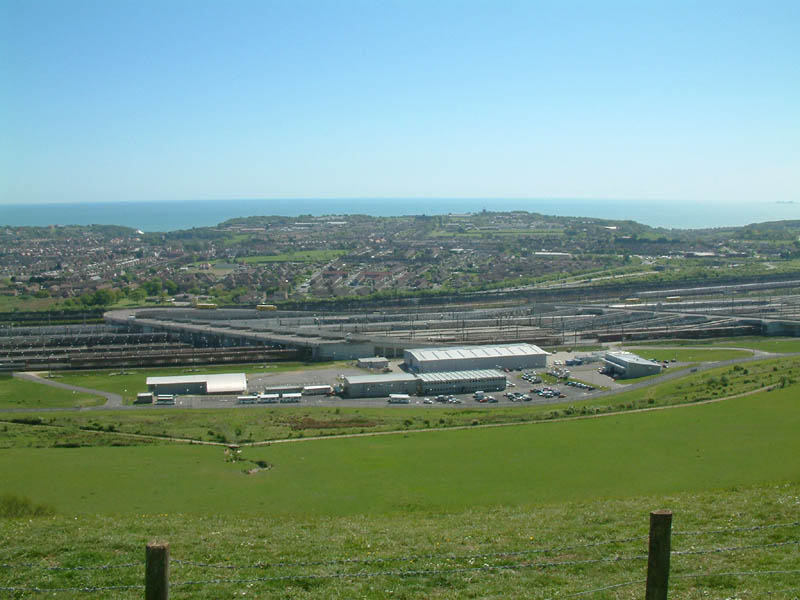
The Cheriton Channel Tunnel terminal from the Pilgrims' Way

By contrast, the southern edge of the hill is a steep escarpment which carries the ancient track named Pilgrims' Way, which is believed to date from 500 to 450 BC, and which runs from Folkestone along the North Downs hills. At this point the escarpment overlooks the huge Cheriton Channel Tunnel terminal, with views to France across the roofs of Folkestone. The slope of this escarpment forms part of the Folkestone Downs and is the location of the Folkestone White Horse, completed in 2003.

Cheriton Hill was the location of the discovery of the Late Spider orchid in the 19th century. At one point the number of known plants at Folkestone/Cheriton declined to just six, but with improved management of the chalk grassland by Eurotunnel and the White Cliffs Countryside Project, the population is now much healthier, estimated in 2008 to be 165 plants, some 30% of the UK population.

Cheriton Hill is one of the Marilyns identified since the publication of The Relative Hills of Britain in 1992, and is the most easterly Marilyn.
