= Trogulus torosus =

Scientific classification
- Kingdom: Animalia
- Phylum: Arthropoda
- Subphylum: Chelicerata
- Class: Arachnida
- Order: Opiliones
- Family: Trogulidae
- Genus: Trogulus
- Species: T. torosus

Binomial name
- Trogulus torosus Simon, 1885

Species of harvestman

Trogulus torosus is a species of large harvestman (order Opiliones) in the family Trogulidae. It is found in the Balkans, primarily in Bosnia and Herzegovina, Croatia, and Montenegro. It is the largest harvestman in the world by body length, up to 23.2 mm (0.91 in).

== Distribution and ecology ==
Trogulus torosus occurs mostly near the coast, usually in the entrance areas of caves. While less common, specimens have been recorded outside of caves, usually retreating into layers of rock. Cave records are common due to more thorough research and specimens retreating into more accessible areas.

== Description ==
The body is red-brown, elongated, and flat, with inconspicuously short hairs and a prominent medial ridge. Small papillae (bumps) occur across much of the prosoma and opisthosoma. The legs are robust, with hairs only conspicuous on the metatarsus and tarsus segments.
