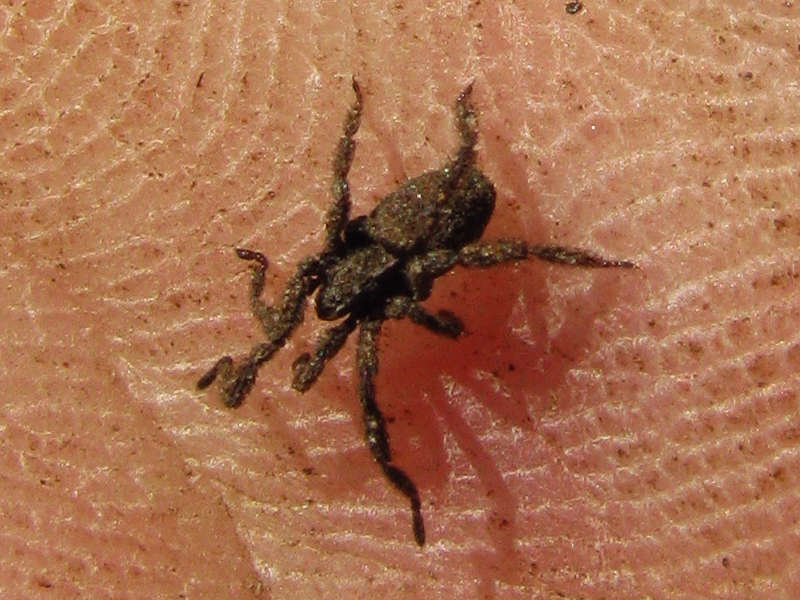
- Anelasmocephalus cambridgei

Scientific classification
- Kingdom: Animalia
- Phylum: Arthropoda
- Subphylum: Chelicerata
- Class: Arachnida
- Order: Opiliones
- Family: Trogulidae
- Genus: Anelasmocephalus; Simon, 1879

= Anelasmocephalus =

Genus of harvestmen

Anelasmocephalus is a genus of harvestmen belonging to the family Trogulidae.

The species of this genus are found in Europe.

== Species ==
Species in this genus:

- Anelasmocephalus balearicus Martens & Chemini, 1988
- Anelasmocephalus brignolii Martens & Chemini, 1988
- Anelasmocephalus calcaneatus Martens & Chemini, 1988
- Anelasmocephalus cambridgei Westwood, 1874
- Anelasmocephalus cazorla Prieto & Las Heras, 2020
- Anelasmocephalus crassipes Lucas, 1846
- Anelasmocephalus gadirrif Prieto & Las Heras, 2020
- Anelasmocephalus hadzii Martens, 1978
- Anelasmocephalus lycosinus Sørensen, 1873
- Anelasmocephalus ortunioi Prieto & Las Heras, 2020
- Anelasmocephalus osellai Martens & Chemini, 1988
- Anelasmocephalus pusillus Simon, 1879
- Anelasmocephalus pyrenaicus Martens, 1978
- Anelasmocephalus rufitarsis Simon, 1879
- Anelasmocephalus tenuiglandis Martens & Chemini, 1988
- Anelasmocephalus tuscus Martens & Chemini, 1988
