= Samphire Hoe =

English country park

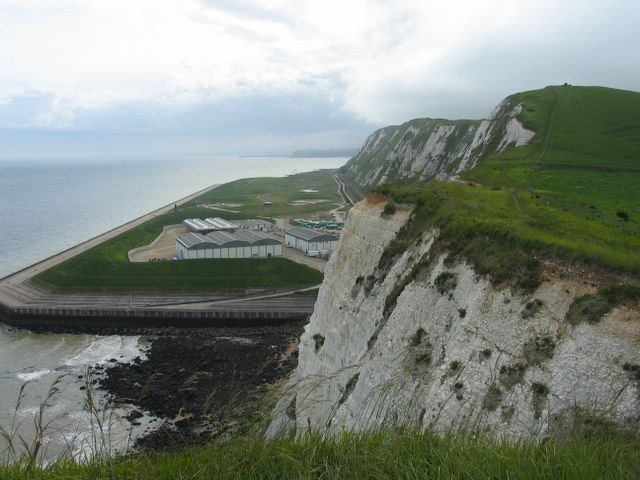
- Samphire Hoe, at the base of the cliffs
- Interactive map of Samphire Hoe
- Coordinates: 51°06′20″N 1°16′30″E
- Area: 30 hectares (300,000 m^{2})
- Created: 1997
- Operator: White Cliffs Countryside Project
- Visitors: 110,000
- Open: 7 days a week, from 7 am until dusk (7 pm)
- Status: Open all year
- Parking: Paid parking
- Website: www.samphirehoe.com

Samphire Hoe shown within Kent (grid reference TR293391)

Samphire Hoe is a country park situated 2 miles (3 km) west of Dover in Kent in southeast England. The park was created by using 4.9 million cubic metres of chalk marl from the Channel Tunnel excavations and is located at the bottom of a section of the White Cliffs of Dover. The site is owned by Getlink, and managed by the White Cliffs Countryside Project.

It is accessible by the public via a single-lane road tunnel controlled by traffic lights, which crosses over the South Eastern Main Line that is running in the Shakespeare Cliff tunnel underneath. Visitor facilities are provided, including car parking, toilets and a café.

== Origin of the name ==
Samphire Hoe is named after the wild plant rock samphire, as mentioned in Shakespeare’s King Lear, that was once collected from the Dover cliffs; its fleshy green leaves were picked in May and pickled in barrels of brine and sent to London, where it was served as a dish to accompany meat. A 'hoe' is a piece of land which sticks out into the sea.

The name was coined by Mrs Gillian Janaway, a retired primary school teacher from Dover, by way of a public competition.

== History of the area ==
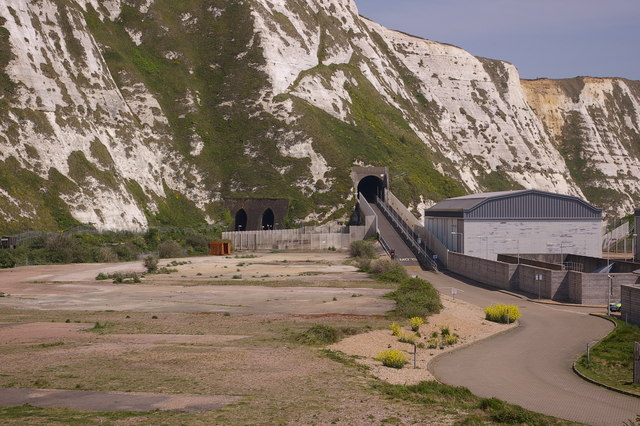
Samphire Hoe. In the background are the tall twin portals to the Shakespeare Tunnel, in the middle is the road access tunnel to the Hoe, from the A20 above the cliff, and on the right is one of the Channel Tunnel equipment sheds.

The cliffs above the current park (Round Down Cliff) were blown up with gunpowder in 1843 to aid the creation of the Dover to Folkestone railway. In 1880 an attempt was made from the site to create a tunnel that would pass under the English Channel but it failed shortly afterwards. In 1895 a coal mine was sunk there but this closed in 1921 after being very unsuccessful. These activities were served by Shakespeare Cliff Halt railway station at the western end of the Shakespeare Cliff tunnel; the remains of the platforms can be seen from the road to the car park, but trains still pass through. A community of fisherfolk and others once lived at the foot of Shakespeare Cliff.

In the 1980s the site was deemed the most suitable of 60 proposed to dump chalk from Channel Tunnel excavations, and work began on it in 1988. As the 30 hectares that make up the park were totally reclaimed from the sea, the first job to be completed was the building of walls in the sea to create an artificial lagoon. The tunnel was completed in 1994 and opened by Queen Elizabeth II and French President François Mitterrand. The park opened to the public in 1997. Samphire Hoe is the location of the cooling station on the English side of the Channel Tunnel, serving as the counterpart to the French station at Sangatte across the Channel.

== Tourism ==
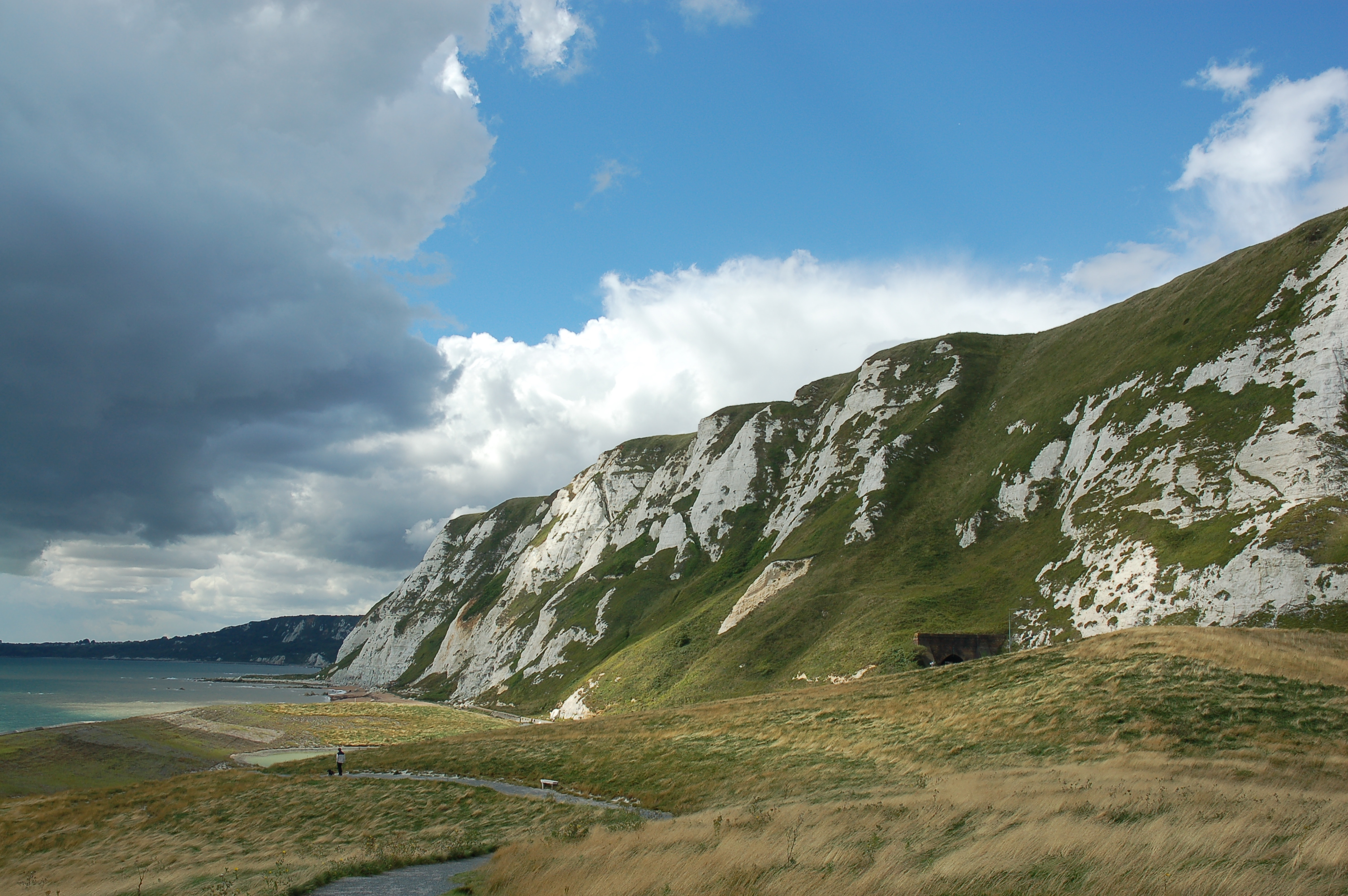
Samphire Hoe beneath the White Cliffs of Dover looking towards Folkestone.

The park now attracts around 110,000 visitors per year, with 140,000 people visiting in 2021. Walking, cycling, angling on the sea wall and bird watching are some of the activities available. The park is open between 7am and dusk; admittance is free and car parking is £2. It is very wheelchair friendly and an education room is available for school use.

The site has a walking trail and serves as a wildlife area. Samphire Hoe has been managed by the White Cliffs Countryside Project, in partnership with the owner, Getlink.

== Walking trail ==
Samphire Hoe has a walking path which makes a full circuit of 2 kilometres (1.2 mi). The level of the path has mild slopes with an average gradient of 1:15, though a little steeper in places, and with cross slopes of up to 1:25. The nature trail within the Hoe is tarmac with fine gravel, but the seawall path is made of smooth concrete. The area has been used for jogging and fun runs on special occasions.

== Ecology ==
The ecology of Samphire Hoe includes wildflowers and birds. It is now a chalk meadow-land with a number of nationally rare plant species including the early spider orchid. In July each year, the rock sea lavender blooms, along with rock samphire.

Peregrine falcons have been seen flying along the cliffs. Some European stonechats and meadow pipits gather on the meadow, while rock pipits move along the base of the cliffs. House martins make mud nests under the overhangs of the chalk cliffs.
