= White Cliffs Countryside Partnership =

White Cliffs Countryside Partnership (Formerly) White Cliffs Countryside Project
- Abbreviation: WCCP
- Formation: 1989
- Legal status: Non-profit company
- Purpose: Help landowners care for the special coast and countryside of Dover and Folkestone and Hythe districts in Kent
- Location: White Cliffs Business Park, Dover, Kent CT16 3PJ
- Region served: Kent
- Members: Optional
- Chairman of the Partnership Board: Nick Johannsen
- Parent organization: Dover District Council
- Website: White Cliffs Countryside Partnership

The White Cliffs Countryside Partnership was established in 1989, to help landowners care for the special coast and countryside of Dover and Folkestone and Hythe districts. This includes the only two stretches of Heritage Coast in Kent; the Dover-Folkestone Heritage Coast and the South Foreland Heritage Coast between Dover and Kingsdown near Deal.

== History ==
The WCCP was launched with 3 staff funded by seven organisations for a limited three-year period. The WCCP has since grown into a much larger organisation with thirteen staff (although many work part-time including footpath leaders). The WCCP celebrated its 20th anniversary in 2009.

In 1992/93, it was estimated that the project (and community groups) contributed to 3450 days of conservation and footpath management work. This was worked out to have cost around £170,000 or 14 local authority staff wages.

In October 2010, volunteers from WCCP, and the Kentish Stour Countryside Partnership went across the Channel to work with counterpart volunteers in France. As part of the 'Landscape and Nature for All' project, funded by the European Regional Development Fund. Then in November, the French volunteers came to the UK to help.

In 2012, Heritage Lottery Fund (HLF) awarded the project with £1.64m, which they added to with funding of £800,000 from local partners.

In 2013, the WCCP was being funded by more than 23 organisations. We carry out long term management of land that has a high value for wildlife and landscape, making it accessible to everyone. Indeed, many of the sites managed by WCCP are on a national or even international level of importance for wildlife. It was decided to change the name to "partnership" to reflect the fact that a large number of organisations are working together to improve the local environment.

The White Cliffs Countryside Partnership is a partnership between Dover District Council, Folkestone & Hythe District Council, Kent County Council, Eurotunnel, Natural England and many other local organisations with financial contributions from the Heritage Lottery Fund.

Also involved in the partnership are Environment Agency, British Energy, Magnox Ltd(formerly Magnox South), Affinity Water, Network Rail, Cemex, Dover Harbour Board, Dover Society (Dover Historic Society), Dungeness Estate, Kent Downs AONB, Kent Wildlife Trust, National Trust, Up on the Downs Landscape Partnership (Landscape Conservation of Dover), Pent Valley Technology College, National Farmers' Union, Canterbury Archaeological Trust, Kent Police, Aylesham Parish Council, Hawkinge Town Council, St Margaret's at Cliffe Parish Council, Walmer Parish Council and Whitfield Parish Council.

== Major projects involved ==
Samphire Hoe Country Park, River Dour, Kent, East Cliff and Warren Country Park, The Undercliff, Cheriton Hill, Folkestone Downs and Miner's Way Trail

They also produce many leaflets and guides for various local walks about the area. Also they arrange volunteers to lead many guided walks throughout the year.
