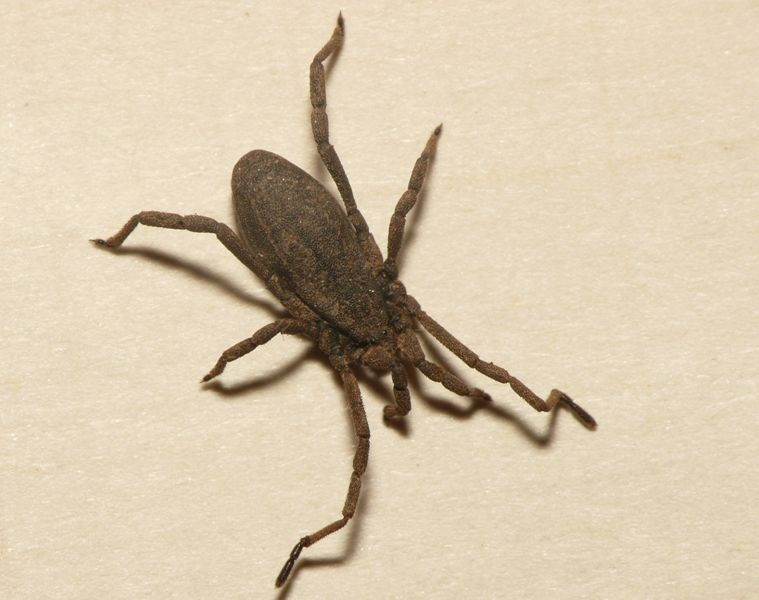
- Trogulus tricarinatus

Scientific classification
- Kingdom: Animalia
- Phylum: Arthropoda
- Subphylum: Chelicerata
- Class: Arachnida
- Order: Opiliones
- Suborder: Dyspnoi
- Superfamily: Troguloidea
- Family: Trogulidae; Sundevall, 1833

Genera
- †Amphitrogulus; Anarthrotarsus; Anelasmocephalus; Calathocratus; Kofiniotis; Trogulus

Diversity
- 6 genera, 65 species
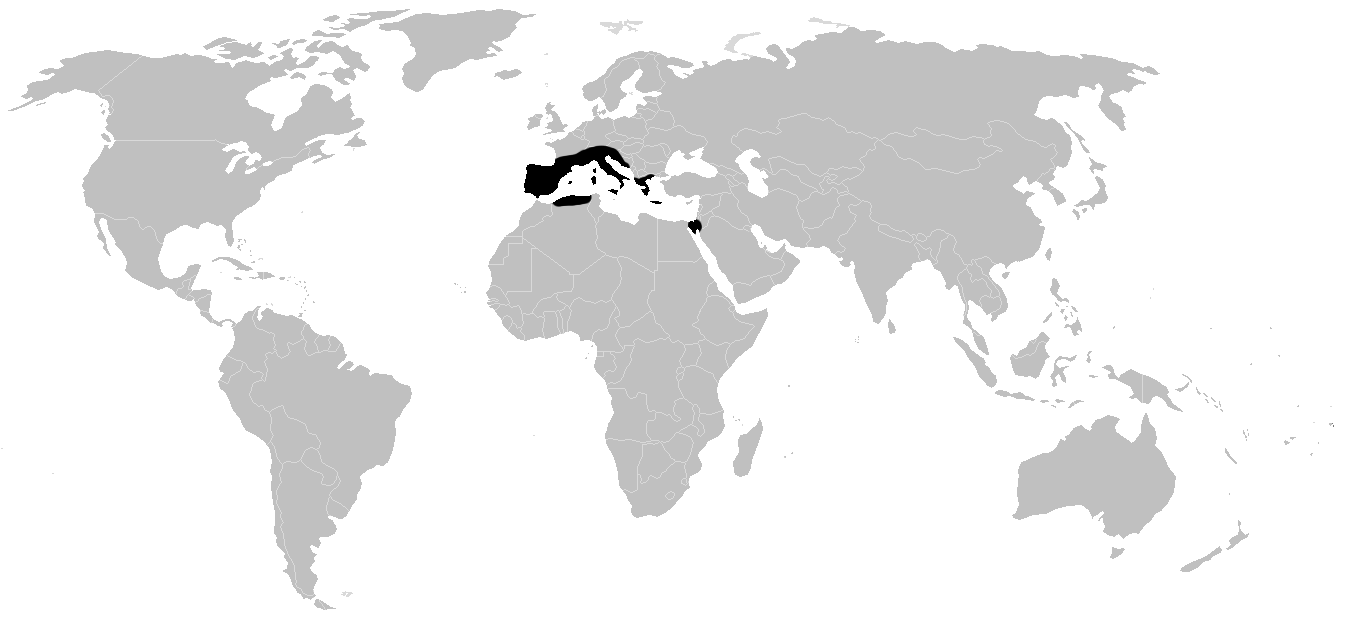
- Approximate natural range of Trogulidae

= Trogulidae =

Trogulidae Temporal range: Palaeogene–present

Family of harvestmen/daddy longlegs

Trogulidae is a family of harvestmen comprising 65 extant species (plus 1 extinct) in five genera.

Members of this species have short legs and live in soil. They have dirt attached to their bodies, to escape predators. Their body length ranges from 2 to 22 mm. In most genera, the body is somewhat flattened and leathery. Adults have a small hood which hides their short chelicerae and pedipalps.

== Distribution ==
Members of this family occur in western and southern Europe, up to western North Africa and the Levant, the Caucasus and northern Iran. Trogulus tricarinatus, a predator of terrestrial snails, has been introduced to eastern North America.

== Name ==
The derivation of the name of the type genus, Trogulus, is not fully understood. The describer Latreille wrote that he named it because it looks like a monkshood. Perrier (1929) however derived the name from the Ancient Greek trogein "gnawing", because of the rough, "gnawed-upon" appearance.

== Species ==
The known genera and species in Trogulidae as of 2023 are:

- Anarthrotarsus Šilhavý, 1967

- Anarthrotarsus martensi Šilhavý, 1967 – Greece
- Anarthrotarsus trichasi Kontos & Martens, 2022 – Greece

- Anelasmocephalus Simon, 1879

- Anelasmocephalus balearicus Martens & Chemini, 1988 – Spain (Baleares)
- Anelasmocephalus brignolii Martens & Chemini, 1988 – Italy (Sardinia)
- Anelasmocephalus calcaneatus Martens & Chemini, 1988 – Italy (Sicily)
- Anelasmocephalus cambridgei (Westwood, 1874) – UK to Balkans (Europe)
- Anelasmocephalus cazorla Prieto & Las Heras, 2020 – Spain
- Anelasmocephalus crassipes (H. Lucas, 1846) – Algeria, Tunisia
- Anelasmocephalus gadirrif Prieto & Las Heras, 2020 – Spain, Morocco
- Anelasmocephalus hadzii Martens, 1978 – Austria, Italy, Serbia, etc Balkans
- Anelasmocephalus lycosinus (Sørensen, 1873) – Italy
- Anelasmocephalus ortunioi Prieto & Las Heras, 2020 – Spain
- Anelasmocephalus osellai Martens & Chemini, 1988 – Italy
- Anelasmocephalus pusillus Simon, 1879 – Italy, France (Corsica)
- Anelasmocephalus pyrenaicus Martens, 1978 – Spain
- Anelasmocephalus rufitarsis Simon, 1879 – Italy, France, Switzerland
- Anelasmocephalus tenuiglandis Martens & Chemini, 1988 – France
- Anelasmocephalus tuscus Martens & Chemini, 1988 – Italy

- Calathocratus Simon, 1879

- Calathocratus africanus (H. Lucas, 1846) – Algeria, Tunisia, Italy
- Calathocratus beieri Gruber, 1968 – Turkey
- Calathocratus caucasicus (Šilhavý, 1966) – Turkey, Azerbaijan, Russia, Georgia, Iran.
- Calathocratus hirsutus Snegovaya, 2011 – Russia
- Calathocratus intermedius Roewer, 1940 – Greece (Crete)
- Calathocratus kyrghyzicus (Chemeris, 2013) – Kyrgyzstan
- Calathocratus minutus Snegovaya, 2011 – Russia
- Calathocratus rhodiensis (Gruber, 1963) – Greece (Rhodes)
- Calathocratus singularis (Roewer, 1940) – Greece, Bulgaria, Turkey
- Calathocratus sinuosus (Sørensen, 1873) – Italy

- Kofiniotis Roewer, 1940

- Kofiniotis creticus Roewer, 1940 – Greece (Crete)

- Trogulus Latreille, 1802

- Trogulus aquaticus Simon, 1879 – France (Corsica)
- Trogulus balearicus Schönhofer & Martens, 2008 – Spain (Baleares)
- Trogulus banaticus Avram, 1971 – Romania, North Macedonia, Serbia, etc.
- Trogulus cisalpinus Chemini & Martens, 1988 – Italy
- Trogulus closanicus Avram, 1971 – Romania, Germany, Bulgaria etc
- Trogulus coreiformis C. L. Koch, in Hahn & Koch, 1839 – (Unknown locality) [Nomen dubium per Schönhofer 2013]
- Trogulus coriziformis C. L. Koch, in Hahn & Koch, 1839 – Italy (contra reports of widespread)
- Trogulus cristatus Simon, 1879 – France, Italy
- Trogulus falcipenis Komposch, 1999 – Austria, Italy, Croatia, Slovenia
- Trogulus graecus Dahl, 1903 – Greece, Albania, etc (Balkans)
- Trogulus gypseus Simon, 1879 – Israel, Egypt, Turkey, Greece.
- Trogulus hirtus Dahl, 1903 – Bosnia and Herzegovina, Croatia
- Trogulus huberi Schönhofer & Martens, 2008 – Portugal
- Trogulus karamanorum Schönhofer & Martens, 2009 – Macedonia, Albania etc (Balkans)
- Trogulus lusitanicus Giltay, 1932 – Portugal
- Trogulus lygaeiformis C. L. Koch, in Hahn & Koch, 1839 – Greece [Nomen dubium per Schönhofer 2013]
- Trogulus martensi Chemini, 1983 – Italy, France, etc
- Trogulus megaligrava Schönhofer et al., 2013 – Greece (Corfu)
- Trogulus melitensis Schönhofer & Martens, 2009 – Croatia
- Trogulus nepaeformis (Scopoli, 1763) – Italy, France, etc (Southern Europe)
- Trogulus oltenicus Avram, 1971 – Romania
- Trogulus ozimeci Schönhofer et al., 2013 – Croatia
- Trogulus pharensis Schönhofer & Martens, 2009 – Croatia
- Trogulus prietoi Schönhofer & Martens, 2008 – Spain
- Trogulus pulverulentus C. L. Koch, 1856 – Spain [Nomen dubium per Schönhofer 2013]
- Trogulus pyrenaicus Schönhofer & Martens, 2008 – Spain
- Trogulus rossicus Šilhavý, 1968 – Russia, Azerbaijan, Georgia
- Trogulus setosissmus Roewer, 1940 – Croatia
- Trogulus squamatus C. L. Koch, in Hahn & Koch, 1839 – Montenegro, Croatia (Dalmatia)
- Trogulus templetonii Westwood, 1833 – Spain [Nomen dubium per Schönhofer 2013]
- Trogulus tenuitarsus Schönhofer et al., 2013 – Macedonia
- Trogulus thaleri Schönhofer & Martens, 2009 – Croatia
- Trogulus tingiformis C. L. Koch, in Hahn & Koch, 1839 – Germany, etc (Central Europe)
- Trogulus torosus Simon, 1885 – Montenegro, Bosnia and Herzegovina, Croatia (Dalmatia)
- Trogulus tricarinatus (Linnaeus, 1758) – Germany, etc (Widespread Western, Central Europe)
- Trogulus uncinatus Gruber, 1973 – Turkey

See also extinct:

- †Trogulus longipes Haupt, 1956 (fossil: Eocene)

Plus see unknown:

- †Amphitrogulus Gourret, 1887

- †Amphitrogulus sternalis Gourret, 1887
