= Anelasmocephalus hadzii =

Scientific classification
- Kingdom: Animalia
- Phylum: Arthropoda
- Subphylum: Chelicerata
- Class: Arachnida
- Order: Opiliones
- Family: Trogulidae
- Genus: Anelasmocephalus
- Species: A. hadzii

Binomial name
- Anelasmocephalus hadzii Martens, 1978

Species of harvestman/daddy longlegs

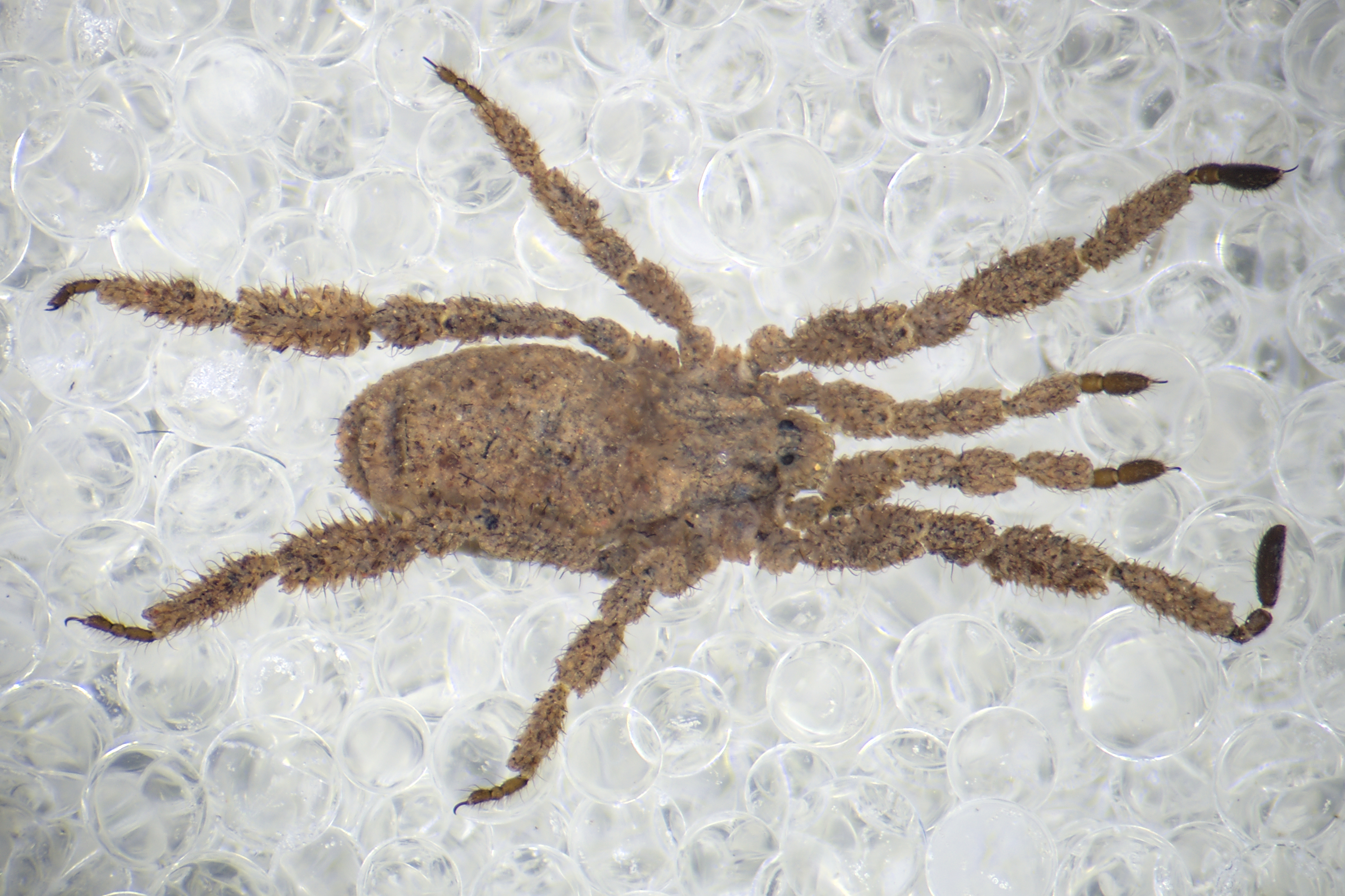
Anelasmocephalus hadzii

Anelasmocephalus hadzii is a species of trogulid, a group of opiliones, native to Europe.

== Characteristic features ==
All of the legs of A. hadzii, except for the calcaneus, are very hairy and warty. Soil particles, as with most trogulidae, are tightly glued to these warts. The glans of the penis is long, has a hook at the end and its distal end is long and thin.
