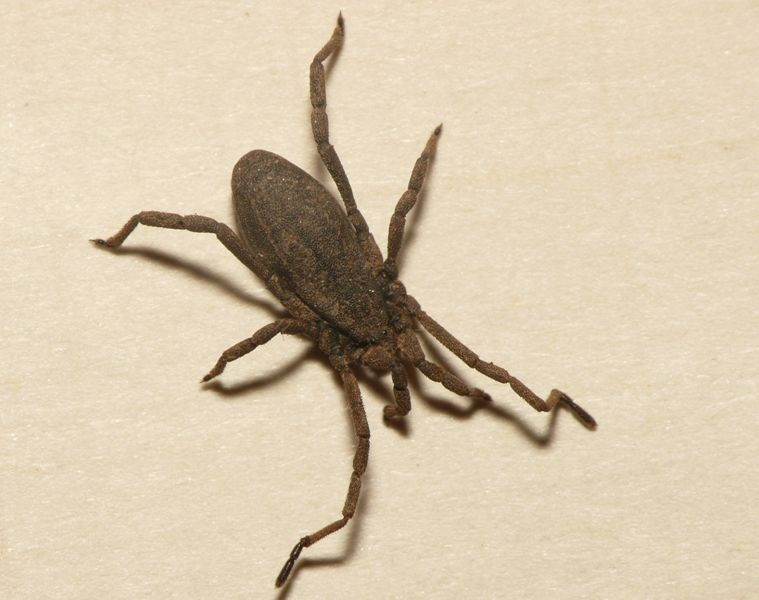
- Trogulus tricarinatus

Scientific classification
- Kingdom: Animalia
- Phylum: Arthropoda
- Subphylum: Chelicerata
- Class: Arachnida
- Order: Opiliones
- Family: Trogulidae
- Genus: Trogulus; Latreille, 1802

= Trogulus =

Genus of harvestmen

Trogulus is a genus of Opiliones (also known as harvestmen) in the family Trogulidae. Harvestmen in the genus have large, elongated and flattened bodies (prosoma and opisthosoma) and a two-segmented tarsus segment on leg II, which distinguishes them from other genera in the family Trogulidae. The legs tend to be short compared to most harvestmen. External morphology tends to be very uniform across species in the genus, making differentiation of species difficult. Species occur in a range of habitats, but are most common in forests where their primary prey, snails, are abundant. Trogulus contains the largest known harvestman by body length, Trogulus torosus.

== Taxonomy and systematics ==
The genus Trogulus is divided into seven species groups–groupings of allopatric species with morphological similarities:

- T. gypseus SG
- T. tricarinatus SG
- T. coriziformis SG
- T. torosus SG
- T. hirtus SG
- T. nepaeformis SG
- T. squamatus SG

However, genetic analysis indicates that two of the seven species groups listed above are not monophyletic. The T. torosus species group with the monophyletic T. hirtus species group nested within it and the T. gypseus species group which contains the monophyletic T. tricarinatus species group are both paraphyletic.

== Species ==
Trogulus contains the following species:

- Trogulus aquaticus Simon, 1879
- Trogulus balearicus Schönhofer & Martens, 2008
- Trogulus banaticus Avram, 1971
- Trogulus cisalpinus Chemini & Martens, 1988
- Trogulus closanicus Avram, 1971
- Trogulus coreiformis Koch, 1839
- Trogulus coriziformis Koch, 1839
- Trogulus cristatus Simon, 1879
- Trogulus falcipenis Komposch, 2000
- Trogulus graecus Dahl, 1903
- Trogulus gypseus Simon, 1879
- Trogulus hirtus Dahl, 1903
- Trogulus huberi Schönhofer & Martens, 2008
- Trogulus karamanorum Schönhofer & Martens, 2009
- †Trogulus longipes Haupt, 1956
- Trogulus lusitanicus Giltay, 1932
- Trogulus lygaeiformis Koch, 1839
- Trogulus martensi Chemini, 1983
- Trogulus megaligrava Schönhofer, Karaman & Martens, 2013
- Trogulus melitensis Schönhofer & Martens, 2009
- Trogulus nepaeformis Scopoli, 1763
- Trogulus oltenicus Avram, 1971
- Trogulus ozimeci Schönhofer, Karaman & Martens, 2013
- Trogulus pharensis Schönhofer & Martens, 2009
- Trogulus prietoi Schönhofer & Martens, 2008
- Trogulus pulverulentus Koch, 1856
- Trogulus pyrenaicus Schönhofer & Martens, 2008
- Trogulus rossicus Šilhavý, 1968
- Trogulus setosissimus Roewer, 1940
- Trogulus squamatus Koch, 1839
- Trogulus templetonii Westwood, 1833
- Trogulus tenuitarsus Schönhofer, Karaman & Martens, 2013
- Trogulus thaleri Schönhofer & Martens, 2009
- Trogulus tingiformis Koch, 1847
- Trogulus torosus Simon, 1885
- Trogulus tricarinatus Linnaeus, 1767
- Trogulus uncinatus Gruber, 1969
