= Chequer's Wood and Old Park =

Protected area in Kent, England

Coordinates: 51.285°N 1.115°E

- Site of Special Scientific Interest
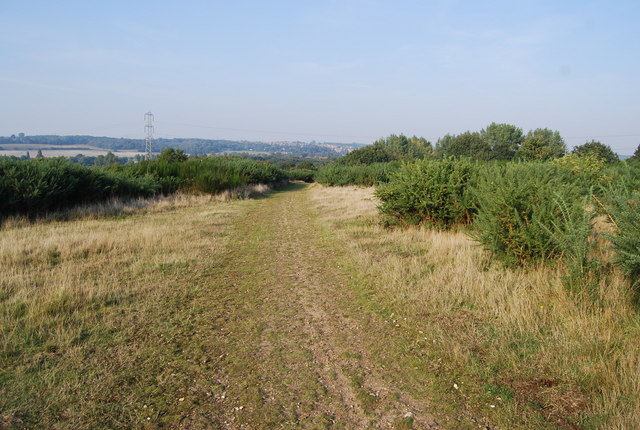
- Location of Chequer's Wood and Old Park.
- Area of search: Kent
- Grid reference: TR 173 586
- Interest: Biological; Geological
- Area: 106.9 hectares (264 acres)
- Notification date: 1985
- Location map: Magic Map

Chequer's Wood and Old Park is a 106.9-hectare (264-acre) biological and geological Site of Special Scientific Interest on the eastern outskirts of Canterbury in Kent. It is a Geological Conservation Review site.

This site includes Fordwich Pit, which has yielded a large collection of early Acheulian handaxes collected in the 1920s when the pit was quarried for gravel. The sediments at the site form part of the fluvial terraces of the River Stour. The context of the handaxes within the sediment sequence is poorly documented, but based on later excavation (which recovered additional lithic flakes but no handaxes) and luminescence dating of the sediments, the hand axes have been suggested to date from two periods of the Middle Pleistocene. A 2025 paper suggested that some of the hand axes date to 712,000 to 621,000 years ago (Marine Isotope Stages 17-16), while others date to the Anglian glaciation event (MIS 12, c. 437,000 years ago). This would make the earlier artefacts the oldest Acheulean handaxes in Britain and northern Europe, and the site the earliest excavatable archaeological site in Britain, as two earlier known occurrences - Happisburgh and Pakefield - are located in cliffs.

Other authors have expressed skepticism about the MIS 17-16 age, due to the handaxes being recovered without adequate documentation, and suggested that the earliest handaxes at the site may date to MIS 15 instead, consistent with other British sites.

The site is also notable for the discovery of stone tools during the Anglian glaciation, as this represent some of the best available evidence for early human species being able to occupy high latitudes during glacial events (ice ages). Early human stone artefacts have, however, been found widely across the site and are believed to be of a similar age.

Habitats include alder wood in a valley bottom, acidic grassland on dry sandy soil, oak and birch woodland, scrub and a pond.

== Access ==
The site is owned by Canterbury City Council and the Ministry of Defence, and includes a pond (Reed Pond) which is managed by a local environmental organisation. There is a footpath and cycle path through it. The majority of the site, formerly used by the military for training, has no public access.
