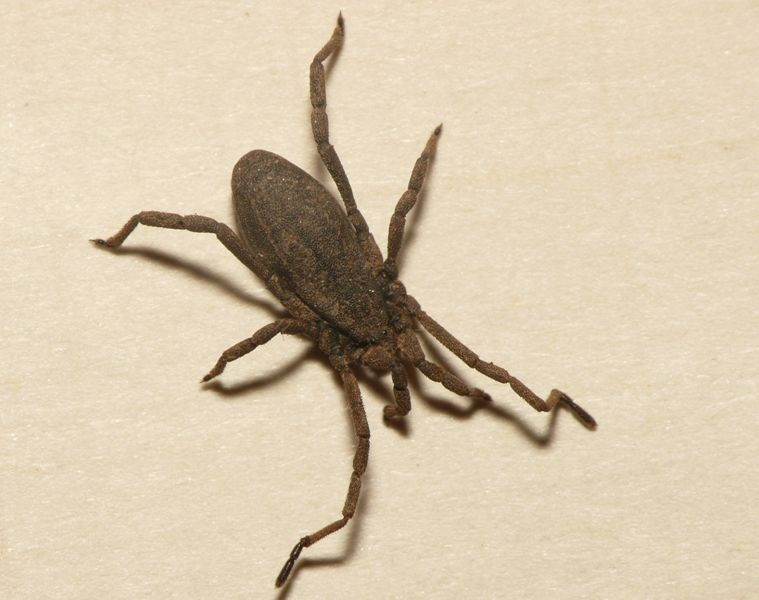

Scientific classification
- Kingdom: Animalia
- Phylum: Arthropoda
- Subphylum: Chelicerata
- Class: Arachnida
- Order: Opiliones
- Family: Trogulidae
- Genus: Trogulus
- Species: T. tricarinatus

Binomial name
- Trogulus tricarinatus Linnaeus, 1758

Synonyms
- Phalangium tricarinatum; Opilio carinatum

= Trogulus tricarinatus =

Species of harvestman/daddy longlegs

Trogulus tricarinatus is a species of harvestman. It is found in Europe and North America.

Trogulus tricarinatus grows to between 7 and 9mm in both sexes. The second pair of legs grow to 8mm. The body is flattened and narrow. The legs are short and robust, with the front two pairs having two segments and the back two three. Immature specimens are violet in colour. They pass through six moults over a period of up to nine months before reaching adulthood.

This harvestman is widespread in Europe (excluding Scandinavia) and has been introduced into North America. It is rare in Britain, usually found only in the south. It is generally found in calcareous areas, and is often found in leaf litter. It moves slowly and is usually covered in particles of dirt.

The openings of the scent glands in this species are not visible and the glands appear to have a non-defensive role.

Trogulus tricarinatus feeds on snails and lays eggs in the empty shells. It also feeds on insects and earthworms.

It is similar to the smaller Anelasmocephalus cambridgei.
