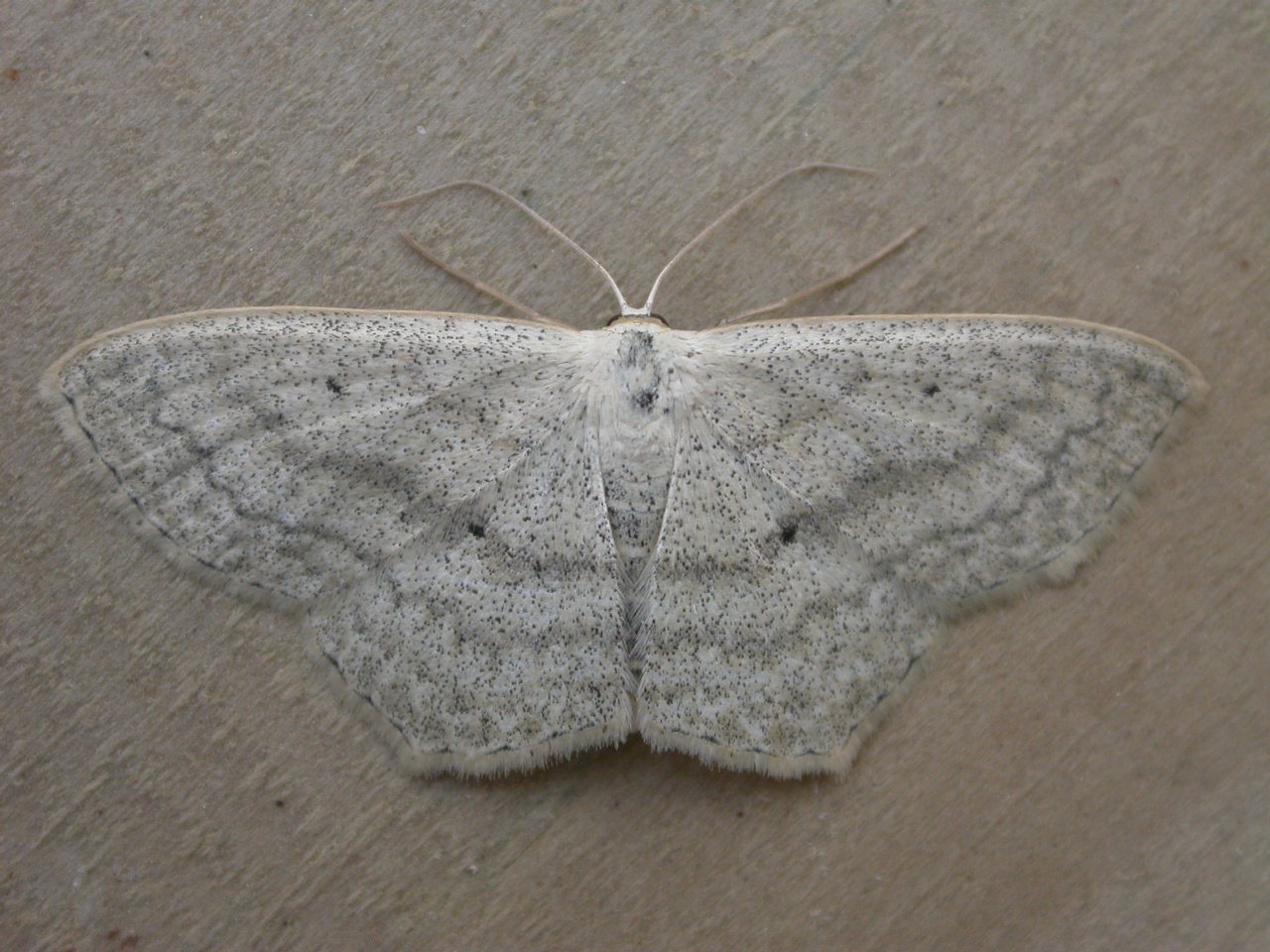

Scientific classification
- Domain: Eukaryota
- Kingdom: Animalia
- Phylum: Arthropoda
- Class: Insecta
- Order: Lepidoptera
- Family: Geometridae
- Genus: Scopula
- Species: S. nigropunctata

Binomial name
- Scopula nigropunctata (Hufnagel, 1767)

Synonyms
- Phalaena nigropunctata Hufnagel, 1767; Calothysanis exemptaria Hubner, 1823; Phalaena inspersata Schrank, 1802; Phalaena nemorata Borkhausen, 1794; Phalaena tristriaria Fabricius, 1794; Craspedia imbella Warren, 1901; Acidalia subcandidata Walker, 1863

= Scopula nigropunctata =

Sub-angled wave

Species of geometer moth in subfamily Sterrhinae

Scopula nigropunctata, the sub-angled wave, is a moth of the family Geometridae. It is found through most of the Palearctic realm.

The species has a wingspan of 29–34 mm. It is closely related to Scopula umbelaria but smaller, less whitish, the ground-colour being appreciably more testaceous and on an average more strongly dusted. The forewing looks slightly shorter and broader, its distal margin being more strongly curved or bent in the middle so that its anterior part becomes less oblique; the black discal spot nearly always distinct, often large; the median shade, which in the typical form is strong and dark, and the postmedian line are both angled near the costa of the forewing, and the former runs rather more obliquely than in umbelaria; the hindwing has the angle in the middle rather stronger on the average, though very variable; both wings have usually a dark terminal line, interrupted at the vein-ends and often thickened between; the black dots in the fringe are very slight or are wanting. Both sexes are sharply marked beneath and differ very little; the basal half, or more, of the forewing is more or less suffused with fuscous, especially on the veins, the inner line wanting; the hindwing has a zigzag outer line. In China and Japan, however, with Korea and probably S. E. Siberia, occur a succession of more puzzling forms, extremely variable in size and shape, in ground-colour and in distinctness of marking. The egg has the normal longitudinal and finer transverse ribbing. The larva is very slender, tapering slightly anteriorly the head rounded, skin transversely ribbed, the spiracles very small, brown; the general colour is greenish grey with a narrow, distinct dull green dorsal line; on the extreme anterior edge of each of the middle segments there is a square black spot, divided down its centre by the dorsal line. The pupa has six minute hooks on the cremaster in addition to the strong pair of central spines.

The moth flies from May to August depending on the location.

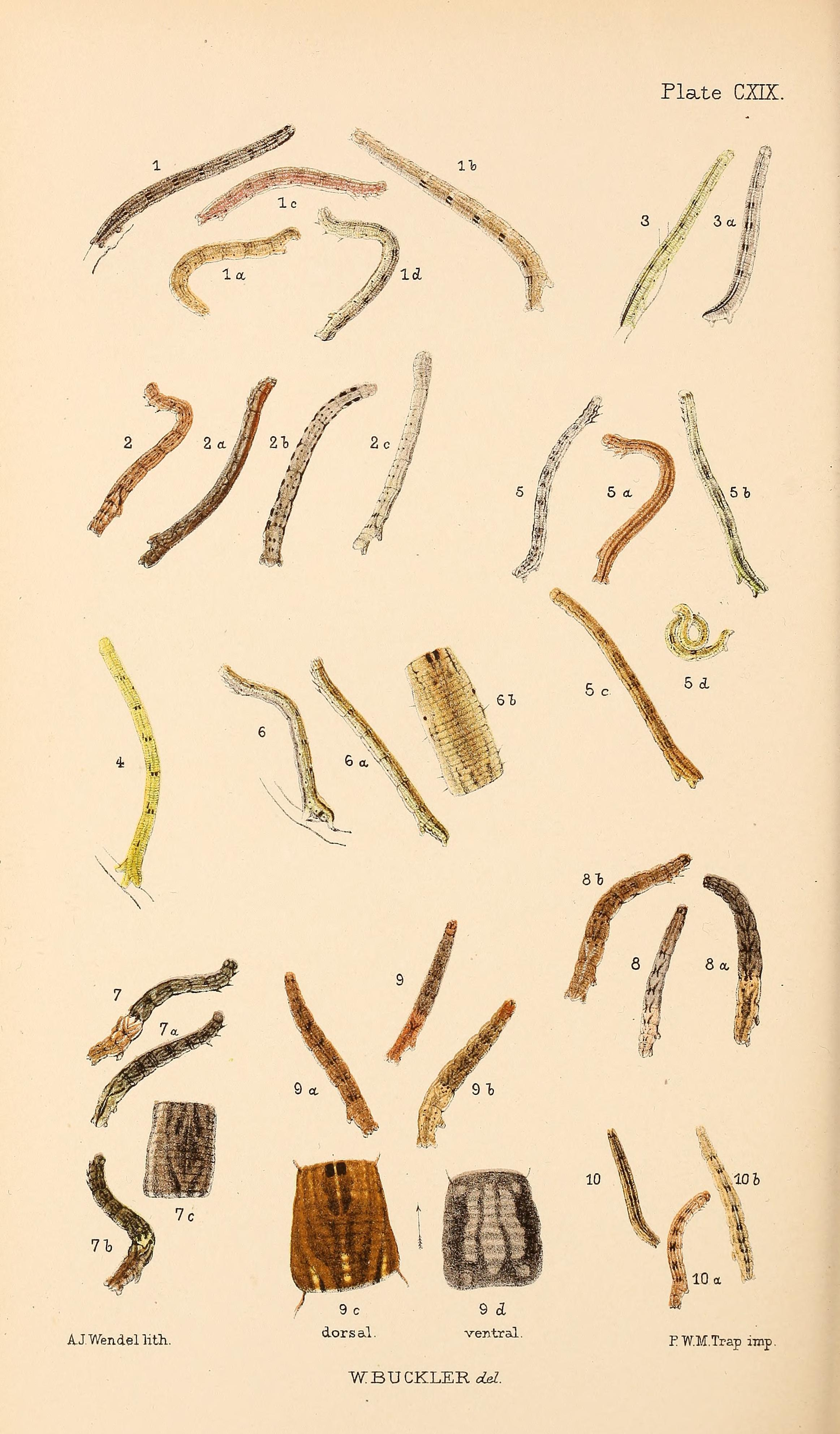
Fig 4 larvae after final moult

The larvae feed on a variety of shrubs and deciduous trees. In captivity they feed on Taraxacum and Clematis species.

== Subspecies ==
- Scopula nigropunctata nigropunctata
- Scopula nigropunctata chosensis Bryk, 1949
- Scopula nigropunctata imbella (Warren, 1901)
- Scopula nigropunctata subcandidata (Walker, [1863])
- Scopula nigropunctata subimbella Inoue, 1958
