= Ichnofauna =

Ichnofauna is the diversity of fauna based on the ichnological (tracks and footprints) evidences. This term is often used by vertebrate paleontologists.

Ichnofauna often uses parataxonomical names for tracks such as Deltapodus, Eubrontes, or Cruziana. Ichnofauna does not give a true content of the fauna assemblage, because of bias of preservation.
