= Folkestone to Etchinghill Escarpment =

Protected area in Kent, England

Coordinates: 51.103°N 1.13°E

- Site of Special Scientific Interest
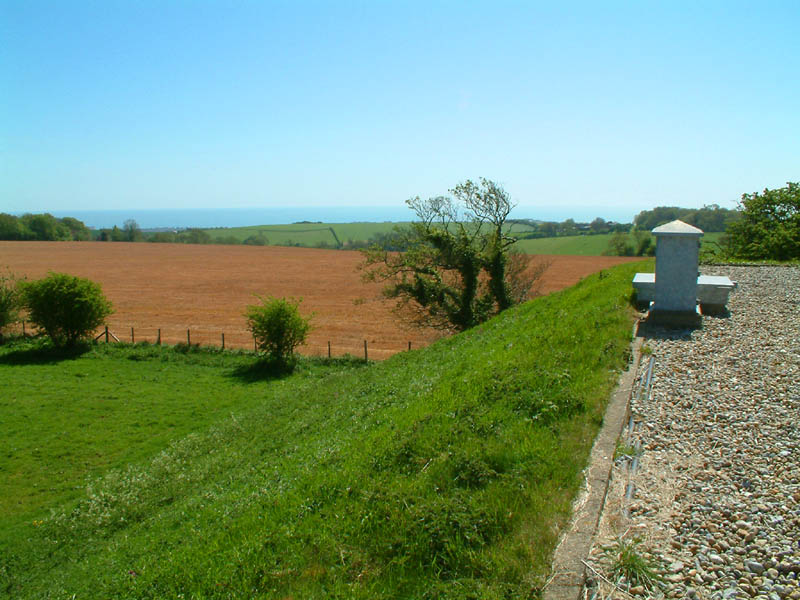
- Location of Folkestone to Etchinghill Escarpment.
- Area of search: Kent
- Grid reference: TR 192 384
- Interest: Biological; Geological
- Area: 263.2 hectares (650 acres)
- Notification date: 1985
- Location map: Magic Map

Folkestone to Etchinghill Escarpment is a 263.2-hectare (650-acre) biological and geological Site of Special Scientific Interest on the northern outskirts of Folkestone in Kent. It is a Special Area of Conservation. An area of 205 hectares (510 acres) is a Nature Conservation Review grassland site, Grade 2, and the 70-hectare (170-acre) Asholt Wood at its western end is a Grade 1 woodland site. The reserve has a Geological Conservation Review site.

A large area of chalk grassland has three nationally rare plants, and Asholt Wood has outstanding lichen flora. The site also includes Holywell Coombe, a key geological site displaying the sequence of mollusc fossils in the late Pleistocene and Holocene.

Part of the land within Folkestone to Etchinghill Escarpment SSSI is owned by the Ministry of Defence.
