= List of hills of Kent =

This is a list of hills in Kent. Many of these hills are important historical, archaeological and nature conservation sites, as well as popular hiking and tourist destinations in the county of Kent in southeast England.

== Colour key ==
Class	Prominence
Marilyns	150 – 599 m
HuMPs	100 – 149 m
TuMPs	30 – 99 m
Unclassified	0 – 29 m

The table is colour-coded based on the classification or "listing" of the hill. The types that occur in Kent are Marilyns, HuMPs and TuMPs, listings based on topographical prominence. "Prominence" correlates strongly with the subjective significance of a summit. Peaks with low prominences are either subsidiary tops of a higher summit or relatively insignificant independent summits. Peaks with high prominences tend to be the highest points around and likely to have extraordinary views. A Marilyn is a hill with a prominence of at least 150 metres or about 500 feet. A "HuMP" (the acronym comes from "Hundred Metre Prominence) is a hill with a prominence of at least 100 but less than 150 metres. In this table Marilyns are in beige and HuMPs in lilac. A "TuMP" as defined here is a hill with a prominence of at least 30 but less than 100 metres. The term "sub-Marilyn" or "sub-HuMP" is used, e.g. in the online Database of British and Irish Hills to indicate hills that fall just below the threshold. To qualify for inclusion, hills must either be 200 metres or higher with a prominence of at least 30 metres, below 200 metres with a prominence of at least 90 metres (the threshold for a sub-HuMP) or be in some other way notable. For further information see the Lists of mountains and hills in the British Isles and the individual articles on Marilyns, HuMPs, and TuMPs. In this context, "TuMP" is used to connote a hill with a prominence of at least 30 but less than 100 metres. By way of contrast, see also the article listing Tumps (a traditional term meaning a hillock, mound, barrow or tumulus).

== Table ==
Hill	Height (m)	Prom. (m)	Grid ref.	Class	Parent	Range/Region	Remarks	Image
Betsom's Hill	251	15	TQ435563	Kent county top (historical and current)	Botley Hill	North Downs	Kent's county top. No feature; ground by lane. Summit is 45 m N of site of old fort which is higher but on artificial ground. Tiny cairn in middle of field may be inaccessible if crops present.	
Toys Hill	248	117	TQ469520	HuMP, TuMP	Botley Hill	Wealden Greensand	Kent's second highest point	
Westerham Heights	245	0	TQ436565	None	Botley Hill	North Downs	Kent's third highest point Also Bromley's borough top and highest point in any Greater London borough No ground feature; E verge of A233.	
Wrotham Hill	235	129	TQ436565	HuMP, TuMP	Botley Hill	North Downs	Trig point at summit.	
Bayley's Hill	216	40	TQ514519	TuMP	Botley Hill	Kent Downs	Alternative summits at TQ 491517 (unnamed) and TQ 487516 (Ide Hill, 216 metres).	
Crockham Hill	216	41	TQ445514	TuMP	Botley Hill	Kent Downs	No feature	
River Hill	215	27	TQ541523	None	Botley Hill	Kent Downs		
Raspit Hill	207	34	TQ577548	TuMP	Botley Hill	Kent Downs		
Detling Hill	200	163	TQ804586	Marilyn, HuMP, TuMP	Botley Hill	Kent Downs	Junction of 3 paths. Long grass may hide true summit.	
Cheriton Hill	188	150	TQ511307	Marilyn, HuMP, TuMP	Crowborough	Kent Downs	Summit on gd 15 m N of fence corner and c. 250 m NW of trig point.	

== See also ==
- List of mountains and hills of the United Kingdom
- List of Marilyns in England
- Geography of Kent
