= Kent Downs =

Area of Outstanding Natural Beauty in Kent, England

Coordinates: 51°17′N 0°35′E

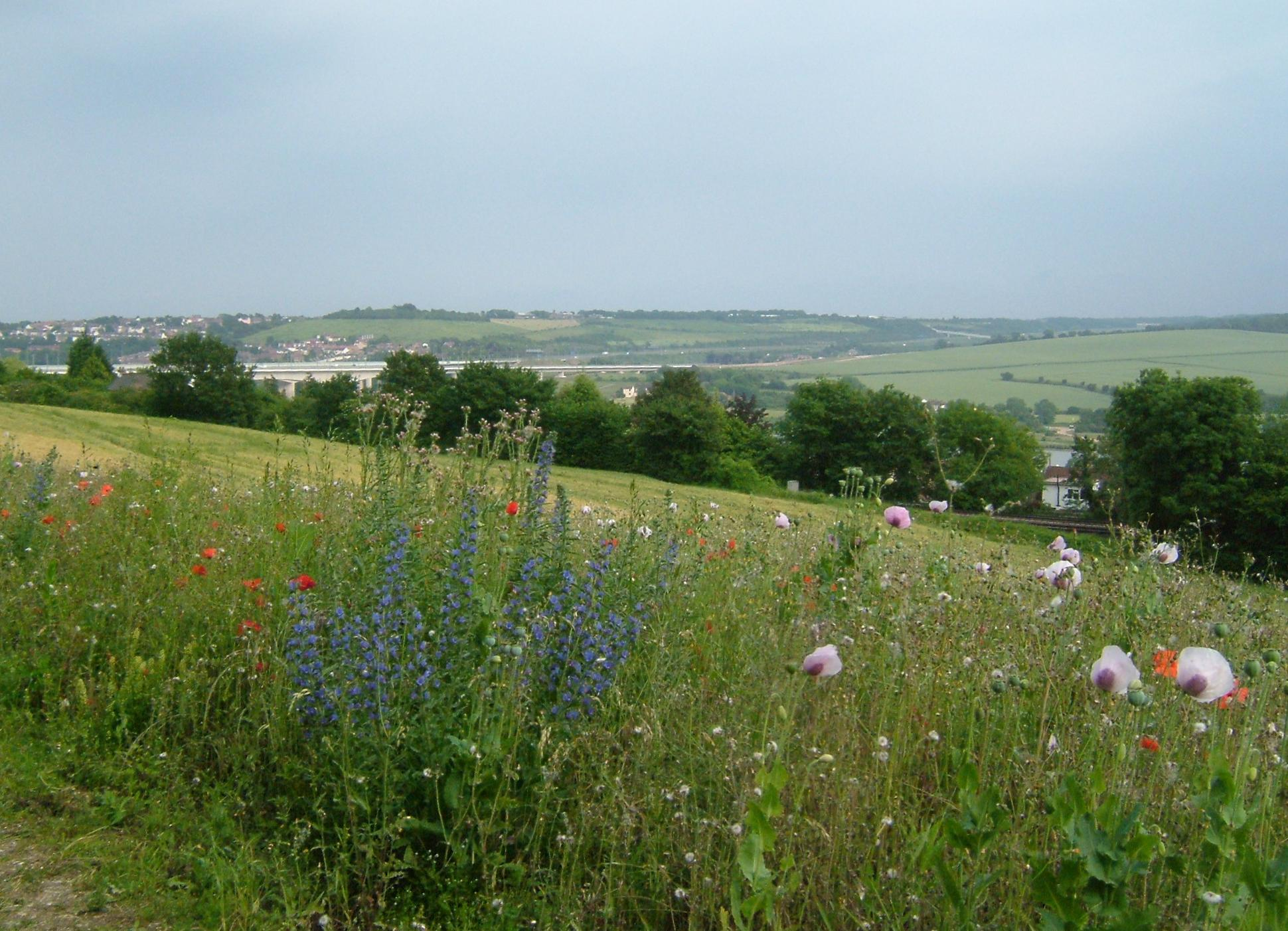
- Ranscombe Farm, Medway. In June, these 'unimproved' meadows are covered with chalk grassland flowers.

- Location of the Kent Downs AONB in the UK
- Location: Kent, England

The Kent Downs is an Area of Outstanding Natural Beauty (AONB) in Kent, England. They are the eastern half of the North Downs and stretch from the London/Surrey borders to the White Cliffs of Dover, including a small section of the London Borough of Bromley. The AONB also includes the Greensand Ridge, a prominent sandstone escarpment which lies south of the chalk escarpment of the North Downs.

It was first designated as an AONB in July 1968 and covers 878 square km (326 square miles). The AONB's highest point is Toy's Hill, at 250m above sea level, and its boundaries include three main rivers: the Darent, Medway and Stour.

To the west, Surrey Hills AONB adjoins the Kent Downs AONB, and includes a continuation of the North Downs chalk ridge which runs through the Kent Downs, stretching from Farnham to the English Channel and reappearing within the Parc Naturel Régional des Caps et Marais d’Opale in France. High Weald AONB lies to the south east, separated by a distance of just over 2km at Bough Beech Reservoir.

As part of the management of the AONB, Village Design Statements have been adopted by 14 per cent of villages within its boundaries.

== Areas ==
Among the named parts of the Downs are:

- Alkham Valley – a dry valley north-west of Dover;
- Betsom's Hill – highest point in Kent at 251 metres (823 ft); near Westerham
- Blue Bell Hill
- Burham Down
- Castle Hill
- Chartham Downs
- Denge Wood
- Detling Hill
- Elham Valley
- Hollingbourne Downs
- Knole Park
- Lullingstone Country Park
- Ranscombe Farm
- Samphire Hoe
- Summerhouse Hill
- Tolsford Hill
- Torry Hill
- Wye Downs

== Walking ==
The North Downs Way runs through the full length of the AONB, the Stour Valley Walk passes through the east of the AONB, and the Greensand Way to the south of Sevenoaks.

== Principal summits ==
The following hills within the National Landscape have at least 30 metres of topographic prominence:

Hill	Elevation	Prominence	Grid reference
Toy's Hill	248 m (814 ft)	117 m	TQ469520
Wrotham Hill	235 m (771 ft)	129.4 m	TQ593600
Wheatsheaf Hill	217.7 m (714 ft)	41.7 m	TQ490516
Crockham Hill	216 m (709 ft)	41 m	TQ445514
Raspit Hill	207 m (679 ft)	37 m	TQ577548
Detling Hill	202.2 m (663 ft)	164.4 m	TQ803586
Cheriton Hill	187.7 m (616 ft)	149.7 m	TR197396
West Down	186 m (610 ft)	73 m	TR091453
Tolsford Hill	183 m (600 ft)	61 m	TR159386
Swinge Hill	173.5 m (569 ft)	63 m	TR242385
The Mount	152 m (499 ft)	41 m	TR043547
Summerhouse Hill	147.9 m (485 ft)	52 m	TR166377
William's Hill	132 m (433 ft)	42 m	TQ700684
Blackhouse Hill	97 m (318 ft)	31 m	TR172355
