= Alkham Valley =

Valley in the Kent Downs, England

Coordinates: 51.13297°N 1.21746°E

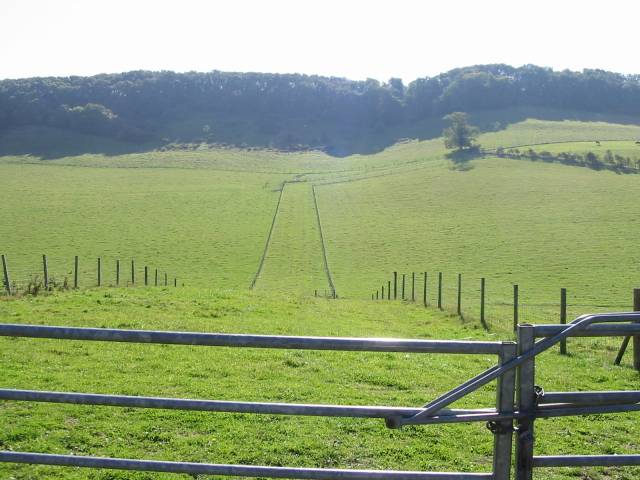

Geology
- Type: Dry valley

Geography
- Location: Kent Downs, South East England, Kent, England
- Topo map: Ordnance Survey: Landranger map sheet 179 Canterbury & East Kent (Dover & Margate) (2013)
- Interactive map of Alkham Valley

The Alkham Valley is in the Kent Downs (the eastern part of the North Downs), an Area of Outstanding Natural Beauty, in South East Kent, England. The valley lies between Folkestone and Dover.

The Valley is a dry valley, typical of many others on the chalk downs.
