= Burham Down =

Nature reserve in Kent, England

Coordinates: 51.334°N 0.489°E

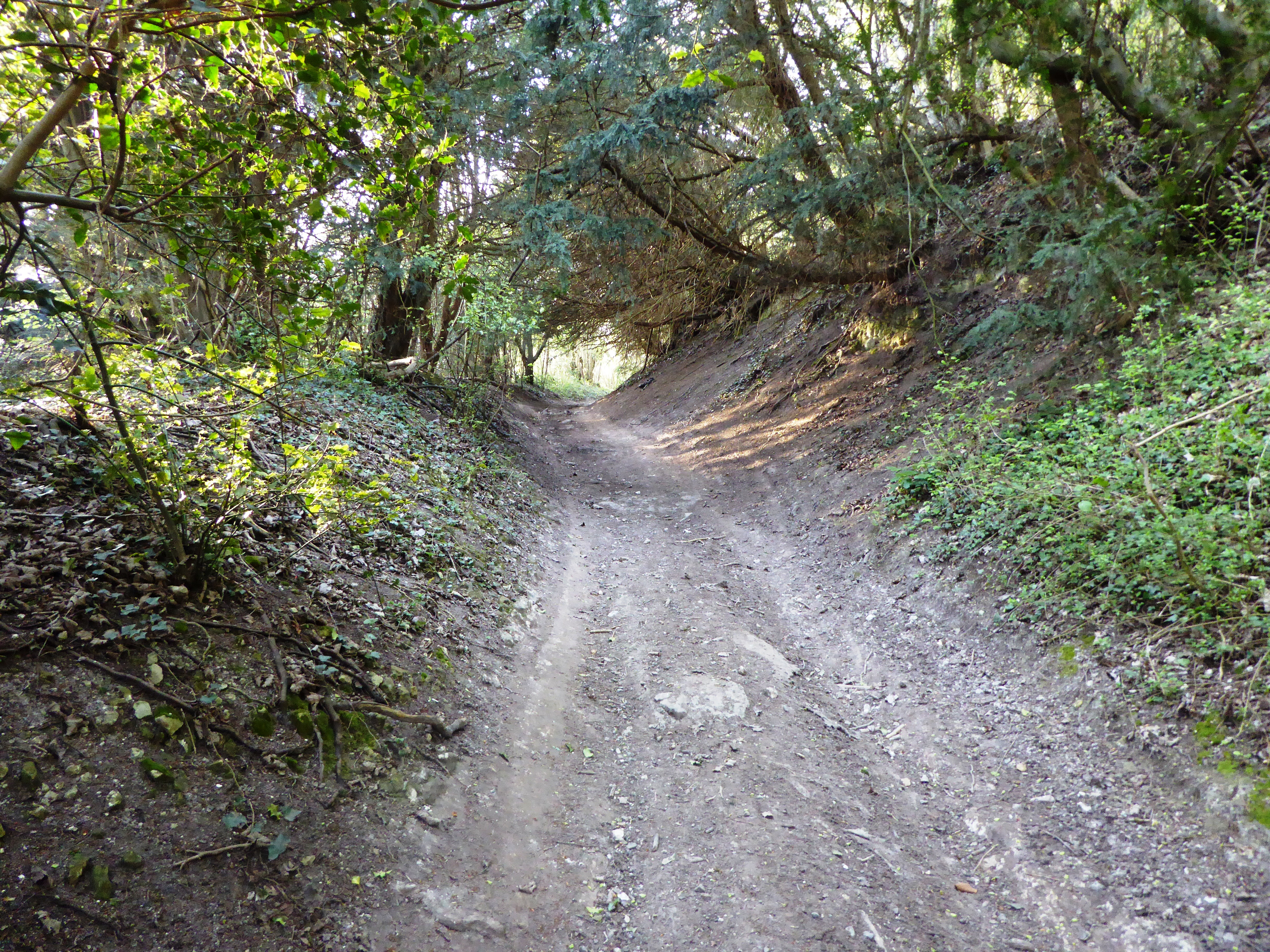
- Interactive map of Burham Down
- Type: Nature reserve
- Location: Chatham, Kent
- OS grid: TQ 735 624
- Area: 110 hectares (270 acres)
- Manager: Kent Wildlife Trust

Burham Down is a 110-hectare (270-acre) nature reserve between Maidstone and Chatham in Kent. It is managed by the Kent Wildlife Trust. It is part of the Wouldham to Detling Escarpment Site of Special Scientific Interest and Nature Conservation Review site, Grade I, the Kent Downs Area of Outstanding Natural Beauty, and the North Downs Woodlands Special Area of Conservation.

== Location ==
Burham Down lies west of the A229 (Maidstone to Chatham Road) adjoining the KCC picnic site (TQ735624 O.S. Map 188) on Common Road, Blue Bell Hill.

Bus 101 Maidstone and Chatham/Gillingham stops in Blue Bell Hill village (1/4 mile). The reserve is accessible via a network of public footpaths with parking at two main areas - the KCC Bluebell Hill Picnic Site and roadside parking near the Windmill Pub in Burham. For safety reasons, entry to the two chalk pits within the reserve is by permit only, available from Kent Wildlife Trust.

Being on a hillside, some paths are steep and uneven and there are some stiles.

== Description ==
It is in two parts, totalling 104 hectares. The south-eastern section (excluding the chalk pits) is dominated by woodland and scrub, with two areas totalling approximately 5 hectares, which are managed by grazing using the Trust's own herd of Exmoor ponies.

The northern section, which includes Wouldham Common, is also predominantly woodland with some recently cleared areas, now under grazing management. Access to this section is by arrangement only.

Woodland and scrub areas have a wide variety of tree and shrub species typical of the chalk soil. This provides an important habitat for dormice and breeding birds including nightingale and hobby. Woodland glades and edges have important populations of lady and fly orchid.

Open grassland areas are important for their chalk grassland flora including man and pyramidal orchid, dropwort and thyme. Butterflies include chalkhill blue, brown argus and silver-spotted skipper; the latter was re-introduced to the site in 1998.

The Down provides views over the Weald of Kent.
