= Denge Wood =

Wood near Canterbury, Kent, England

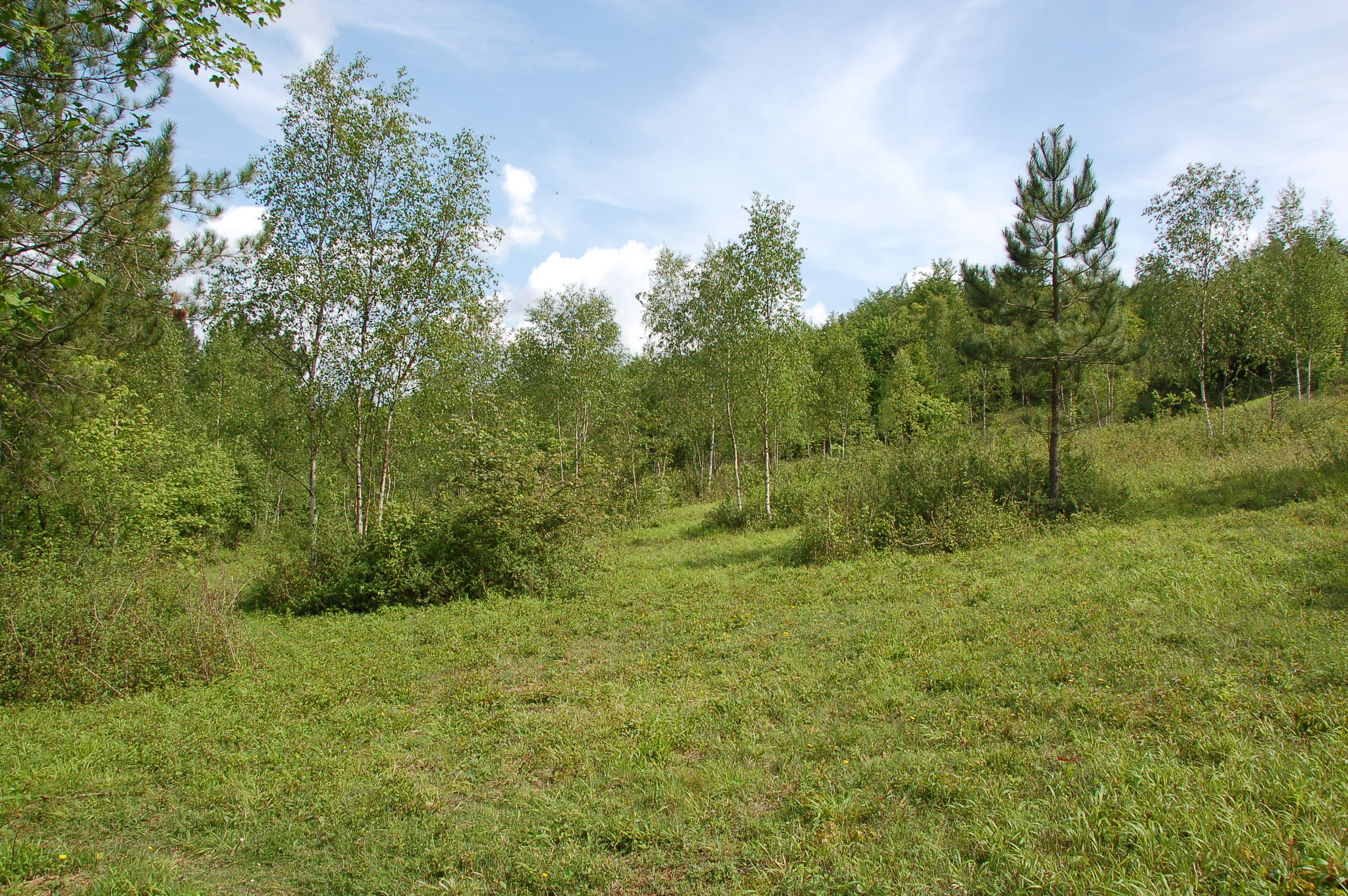
- Chalk grassland and shrubland at Bonsai Bank in Denge Wood

- Location within Kent

Geography
- Location: Kent, England
- OS grid: TR102514
- Coordinates: 51.2235°N 1.0098°E

Denge Wood is a wood located 8 miles southwest of Canterbury in Kent, England. The wood is owned by the Forestry Commission and the Woodland Trust. Part of the wood is also privately owned. Much of Denge Wood is classified as ancient semi-natural woodland suggesting it has been in existence since at least 1600AD and probably longer.

== Location and geology ==
Denge Wood is situated on the dip slope of the North Downs and within the Kent Downs AONB. The wood is located on clay with flints over chalk bedrock at a maximum altitude of 140 metres. Two dry valleys run northward on the eastern side of the wood whilst the western side is located on a plateau. The westernmost fringes of Eggringe Wood and Down Wood form part of the eastern Stour Valley escarpment.

== Ecology ==
=== Flora ===
The wood consists largely of chestnut coppice and conifer plantations. There are also areas of beech (Fagus sylvatica), hazel (Corylus avellana), ash (Fraxinus excelsior) and oak (Quercus robur) woodland. There are several clearings in the wood where there is a mixture of scrubland and chalk grassland such as at Bonsai Bank. Bluebell (Hyacinthoides non-scripta) and wood anemone (Anemone nemorosa) grow on neutral soils whilst on the alkaline, lime rich soils plants such as dog's mercury (Mercurialis perennis), herb paris (Paris quadrifolia) and columbine (Aquilegia vulgaris) can be found.

Denge Wood is particularly notable for the range of orchids that it supports. twayblade (Neottia ovata), common spotted orchid (Dactylorhiza fuchsii), pyramidal orchid (Anacamptis pyramidalis), greater butterfly orchid (Platanthera chlorantha), man orchid (Aceras anthropophorum) and fragrant orchid (Gymnadenia conopsea) occur in the scrubland and chalk grassland. The early purple orchid (Orchis mascula), fly orchid (Ophrys insectifera), lesser butterfly orchid (Platanthera bifolia) and bird's nest orchid (Neottia nidus-avis) can be found in woodland areas whilst there is also a large population of the rare lady orchid (Orchis purpurea).

=== Fauna ===
The wood provides an important habitat for nesting and migratory birds including the nightingale (Luscinia megarhynchos), chiffchaff (Phylloscopus collybita) and spotted flycatcher (Muscicapa striata). Up to 27 species of butterfly have been recorded in the area managed by the Woodland Trust and there are populations of green hairstreak (Callophrys rubi), grizzled skipper (Pyrgus malvae) and the scarce Duke of Burgundy (Hamearis lucina). The woodland provides a habitat for mammals including the dormouse (Muscardinus avellanarius) and reptiles such as common lizard (Zootoca vivipara) and adder (Vipera berus). There are also populations of fallow deer (Dama dama) and roe deer (Capreolus capreolus).

== Human use ==
Denge Wood is a popular site for walking and horse-riding due to its scenery and ecological interest. The land that is owned by the Woodland Trust and Forestry Commission is open access and there a network of footpaths, bridleways and byways that cross the wood. Parts of Denge Wood are also used for economic activity such as forestry.

In May 2005, Denge Wood was the site of a rave that attracted approximately 2000 people to the site. The rave resulted in substantial damage to wildlife and the rubbish left behind including human excrement, methadone bottles and needles took a whole day to clear up. The Criminal Justice and Public Order Act prevents raves although the police stated that they did not have the resources available at the time to act against the event.
