= Wye and Crundale Downs =

Protected areas in Kent, England

Coordinates: 51.176°N 0.969°E

- Site of Special Scientific Interest
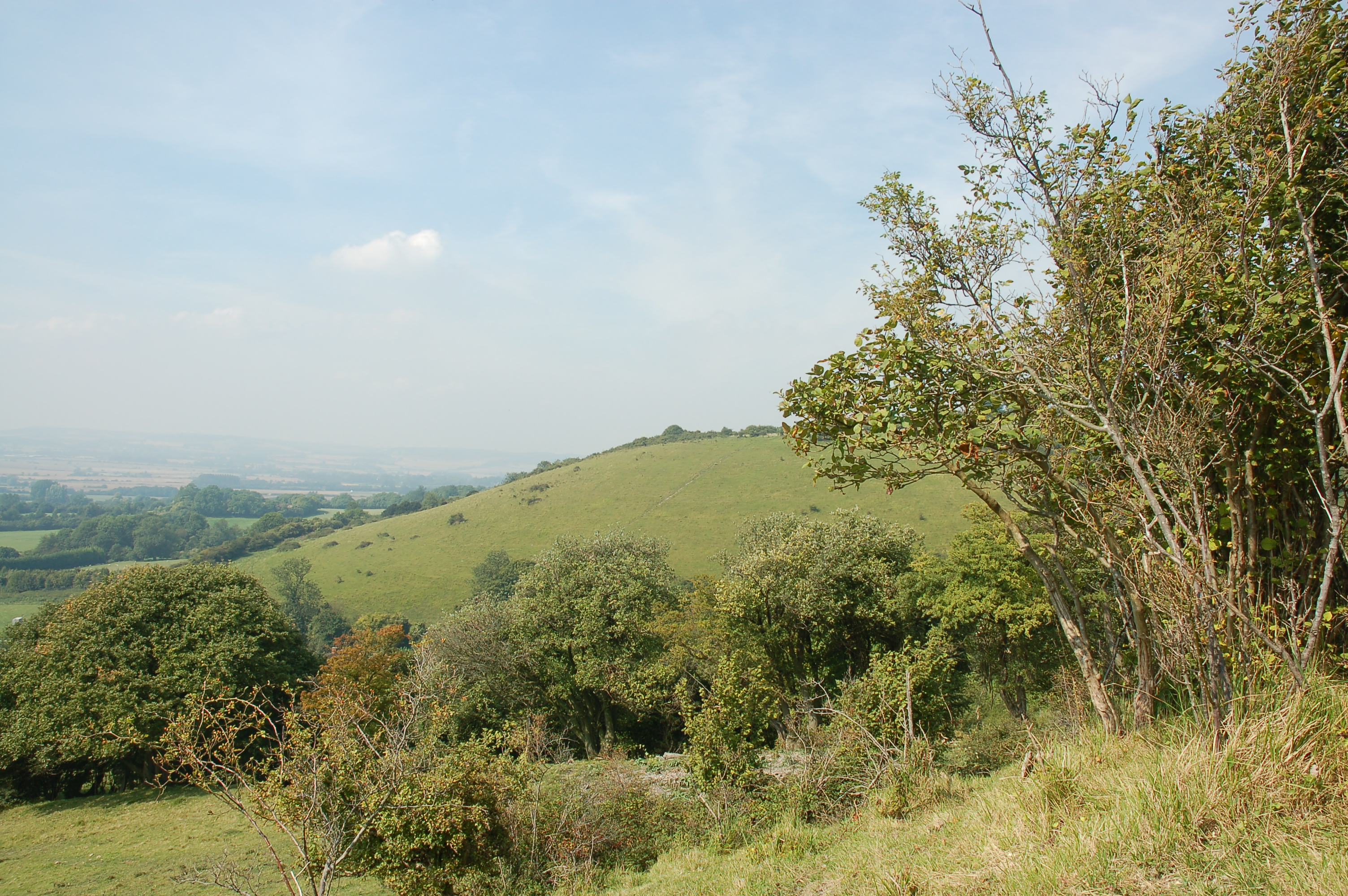
- Wye Downs
- Location of Wye and Crundale Downs.
- Area of search: Kent
- Grid reference: TR 076 460
- Interest: Biological; Geological
- Area: 358.3 hectares (885 acres)
- Notification date: 1989
- Location map: Magic Map

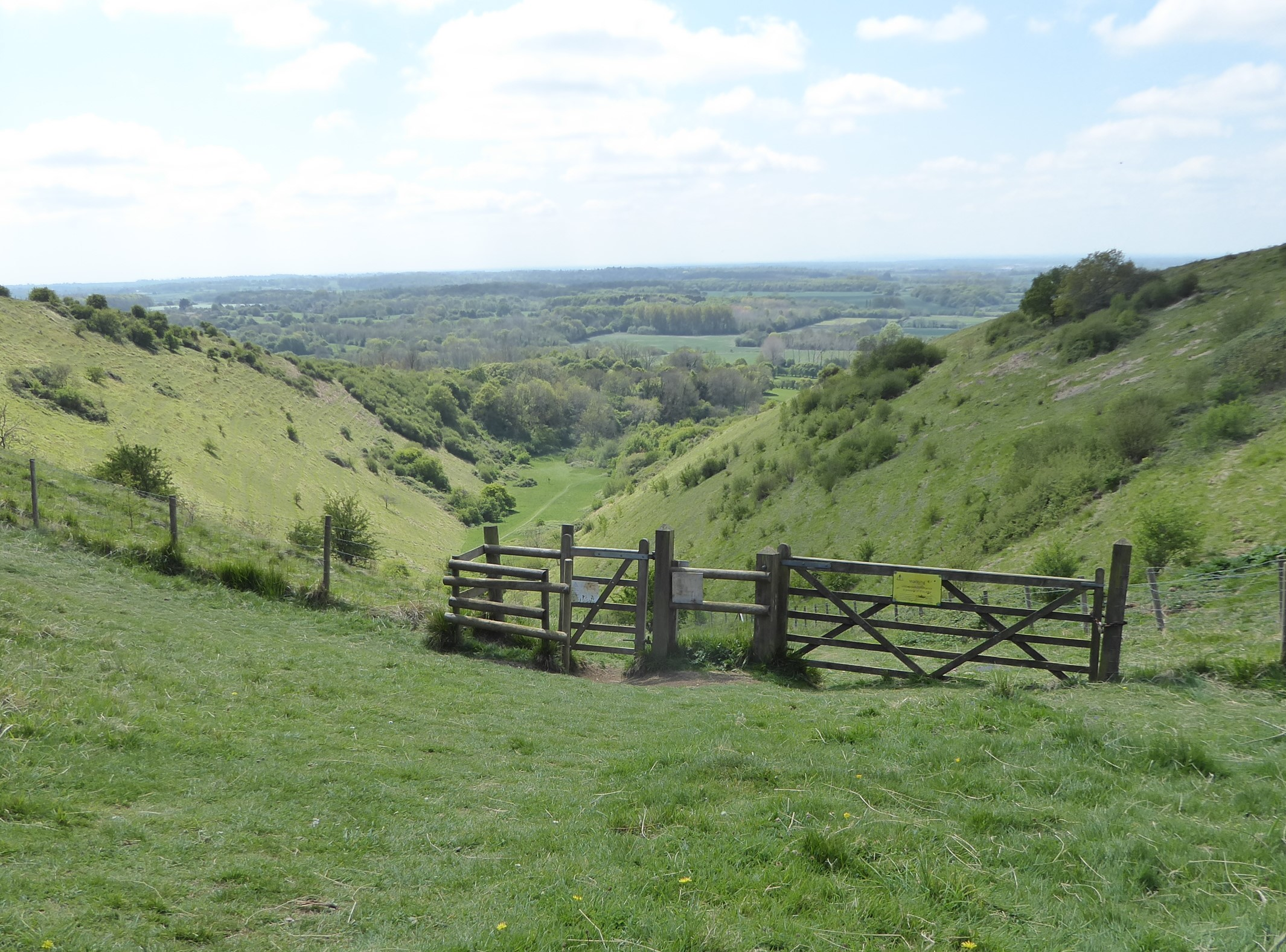
View from the top of the Devil's Kneading Trough

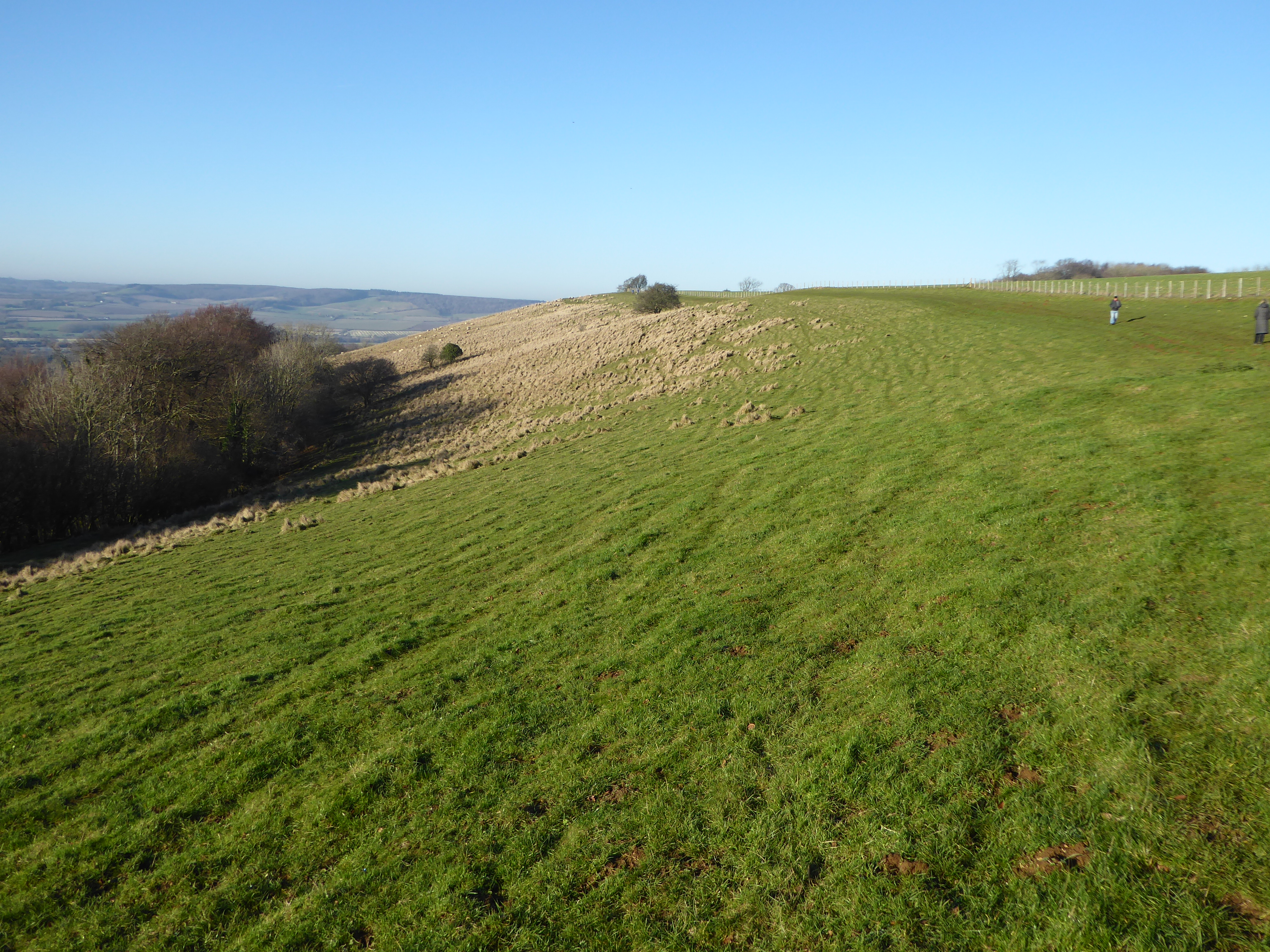
Wye Crown Down in the winter.

Wye and Crundale Downs is a 358.3-hectare (885-acre) biological and geological Site of Special Scientific Interest in a number of separate areas east of Ashford in Kent. It is a Special Area of Conservation and a Nature Conservation Review site, Grade I. and it is part of Kent Downs Area of Outstanding Natural Beauty. Some areas are part of a National Nature Reserve, and another area is listed on the Geological Conservation Review.

The most well-known part of the SSSI, usually known as "Wye Downs," is a stretch of chalk downland and woodland located on the North Downs near the village of Wye. The site is a national nature reserve (NNR) owned and managed by Natural England, and comprises a chalk escarpment dissected by several coombes, which were formed by frost weathering in the period following the last ice age. The most spectacular coombe is known as the Devil's Kneading Trough.

The field containing Wye Crown is also within the NNR but is privately owned. Originally the Crown was carved in the chalk but is now made of white-painted stone gabions.

Crundale is a valley situated a few kilometers north of Wye Downs, the main part of which is Winchcombe Down, another chalk escarpment, owned and managed by Natural England, although it is not publicly accessible except along the North Downs Way footpath.

== Wildlife ==
The sites have a variety of habitats, including grassland, calcareous fen meadow, scrub, dry woodland on chalk and wet alder woodland.

Over 21 species of orchids have been recorded at the reserve including one of the UK's rarest species, the late spider-orchid. Many uncommon species of animals are also found here, including the Duke of Burgundy butterfly and black-veined moth.

== Access ==
There are two public car parks at the top of Wye Downs, along Coldharbour Lane. They are free to use, but a donation is requested (to be paid by mobile phone app). Marked trails extend around Pickersdane Scrubs and Broad Downs, including the Devil's Kneading Trough. The rest of Wye Downs is open to the public, but there are few formal paths.

Crown Field has is a popular view point and can be accessed via a public footpath from Coldharbour Lane.

== In popular culture ==
Author Russell Hoban repurposed The Devil's Kneading Trough as "Mr Clevvers Roaling Place" in his 1980, post apocalyptic novel Riddley Walker. Withersdane became "Widders Dump"; Wye, "How"; Pet Street, "Pig Sweet", and the Crundale Downs themselves, "Bundel Downs".
