= Dry valley =

Valley that does not regularly sustain surface water flow

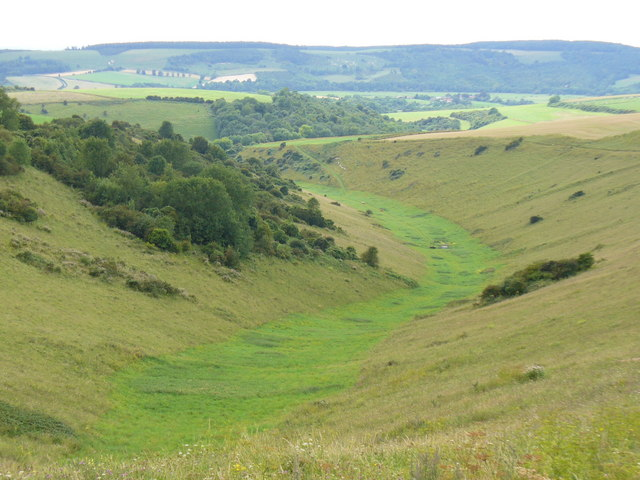
A dry valley near Rackham Hill, South Downs, England

A dry valley may develop on many kinds of permeable rock, such as limestone, chalk, sand stone and sandy terrains that do not regularly sustain surface water flow. Such valleys do not hold surface water because it sinks into the permeable bedrock.

There are many examples of chalk dry valleys along the North and South Downs in Southern England. Notably the National Trust-owned Devil's Dyke near Brighton covers some 200 acres (0.81 km^{2}) of downland scarp, and includes the deepest dry valley in the world – created when melting water eroded the chalk downland to the permafrost layer after the last ice age. The three-quarter mile long curved dry valley is around 700 feet (210 m) in height and attracts tourists with its views of Sussex, Hampshire and Kent.

Other examples include the Alkham Valley near Dover, and the Hartley Bottom and Fawkham valleys near Dartford in north Kent.

There are many examples of limestone dry valleys in the Peak District and the Yorkshire Wolds. A notable example is the valley of the River Manifold which is dry, except in spate, from Wetton south for several miles.

Many hypotheses have been advanced to explain dry valley development. Some may have developed during periods of higher water table, others in periglacial conditions during which normally permeable bedrock would have been made impervious by permafrost, thus allowing flowing water to erode it.

== See also ==
- McMurdo Dry Valleys
