= North Downs Way =

Long-distance footpath in the south of England

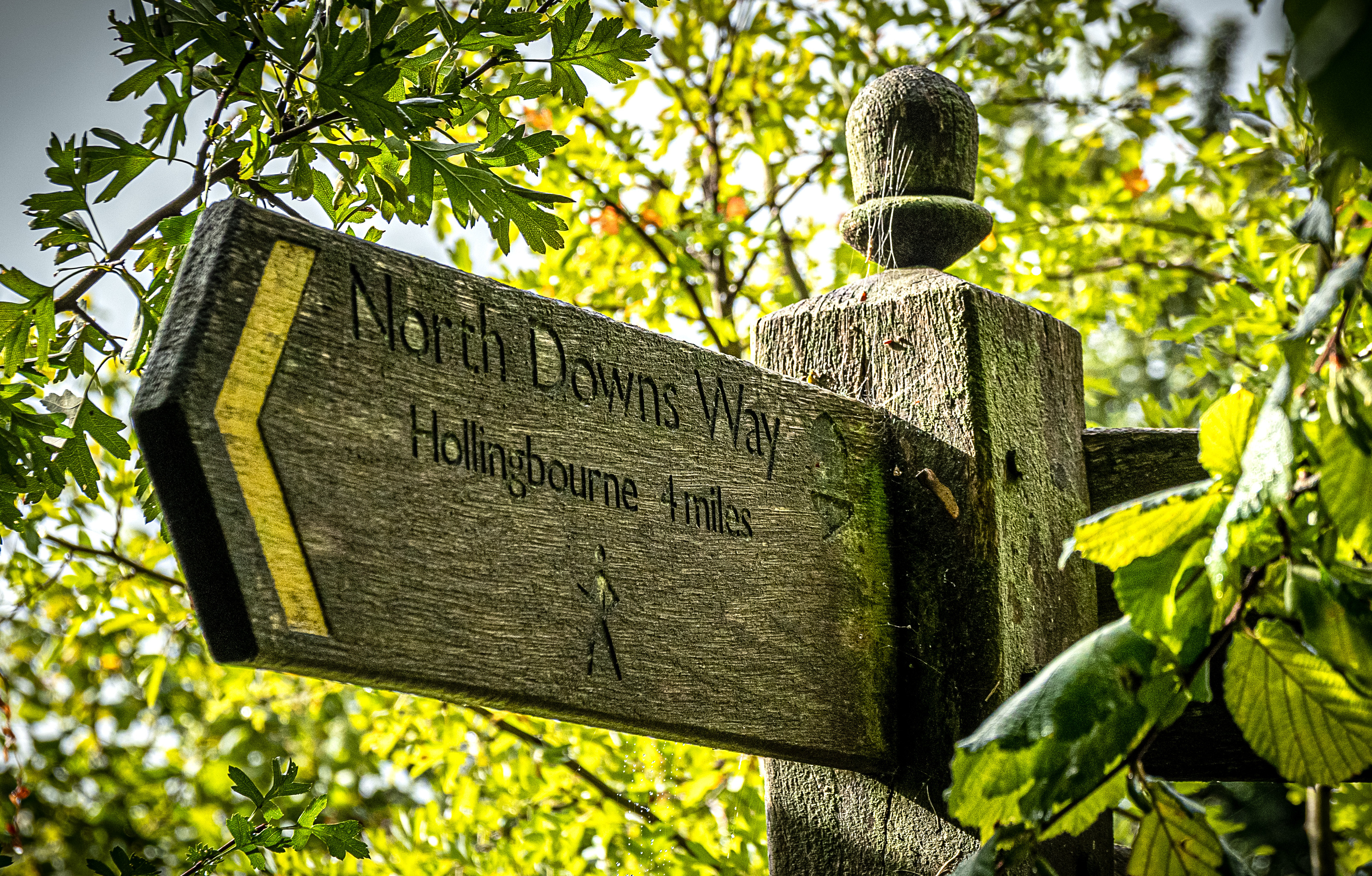
- The North Downs Way near Hollingbourne
- Length: 153 mi (246 km)
- Location: South Eastern England, United Kingdom
- Designation: UK National Trail
- Trailheads: Farnham, Surrey; Dover, Kent
- Use: Hiking
- Highest point: Botley Hill, 885 ft (270 m)
- Season: All year

The North Downs Way National Trail is a long-distance path in South East England, opened in 1978. It runs from Farnham in Surrey to Dover in Kent, past Guildford, Dorking, Merstham, Otford and Rochester, through the Surrey Hills National Landscape and the Kent Downs Area of Outstanding Natural Beauty.

== History ==
The Greater London Plan, compiled by Patrick Abercrombie and published in 1944, proposed a framework of development for the city and its surroundings. To facilitate the enjoyment of the countryside, the plan envisaged a network of paths connecting green spaces that were to be protected from development. One of the appendices to the plan, Map 14, proposed a footpath system featuring long-distance routes including a "North Down Way" [sic], which it marks as running from the Hog's Back to Otford, from where it continues as the "Pilgrims' Way" to Canterbury and the Kent coast. (Note: Map 14 of the Greater London Plan also shows a potential Greensand Way running from the east of Reigate to the south of Sevenoaks.) Three years later, the "Report of the National Parks Committee", compiled by Arthur Hobhouse identified the traditional route of the Pilgrims' Way from Winchester to Canterbury as a potential long-distance footpath.

The Hobhouse report was followed two years later by the National Parks and Access to the Countryside Act 1949, which created a legal mechanism to establish public access over publicly owned land. The Act delegated the responsibility for creating long-distance paths to the National Parks Commission and, during parliamentary debate before the Act was passed, the Minister of Town and Country Planning, Lewis Silkin, identified the Pilgrims' Way as one of the routes that he hoped would be created. Securing funding for the new long-distance paths was given a low priority and the first route, the Pennine Way, was not completed until 1965.

After the Act was passed,, Kent County Council (KCC) proposed a new long-distance path that would partly follow the route of the North Downs escarpment. In May 1949, it published an outline development plan for the "Kent Path", that would run from the Surrey border to Sandwich Bay. Two years later, as part of its preparations for the Festival of Britain, the council installed direction signs on the section of the Pilgrims' Way through Kent; Surrey County Council (SCC) refused to do the same for the western part of the route, citing the cost of securing the necessary rights of way.

In August 1965, a few months after the completion of the Pennine Way, the National Parks Commission announced that it was negotiating with SCC and KCC to create a long-distance footpath from Farnham to Folkestone, to be called the North Downs Way. Where possible, the path was to run along the top of the North Downs escarpment for the best views to the south, in preference to following the traditional route of the Pilgrims' Way, a significant proportion of which was used by motor vehicles. The commission published its proposed route in late 1965, but the plans did not initially include the loop via Canterbury, which had been suggested by KCC. In January the following year, the commission indicated that it supported the eastward continuation of the path from Folkestone to Dover. KCC continued to argue for the inclusion of the Canterbury loop, which was agreed by the Minister of Housing and Local Government, Anthony Greenwood, in July 1969.

The creation of new rights of way along the route began in mid-1970. The first part of the North Downs Way, 41 mi (66 km) from Hollingbourne to Dover via Canterbury, opened in May 1972 and five years later, in June 1977, a 13 mi (21 km) section in the Sevenoaks area was completed. The Surrey section of the path was formally opened on 21 May 1978 in a ceremony at Newlands Corner. The ceremonial opening of the completed route by Donald Coggan, Archbishop of Canterbury, took place at Wye and Crundall National Nature Reserve, Kent, on 30 September 1978.

== Route ==
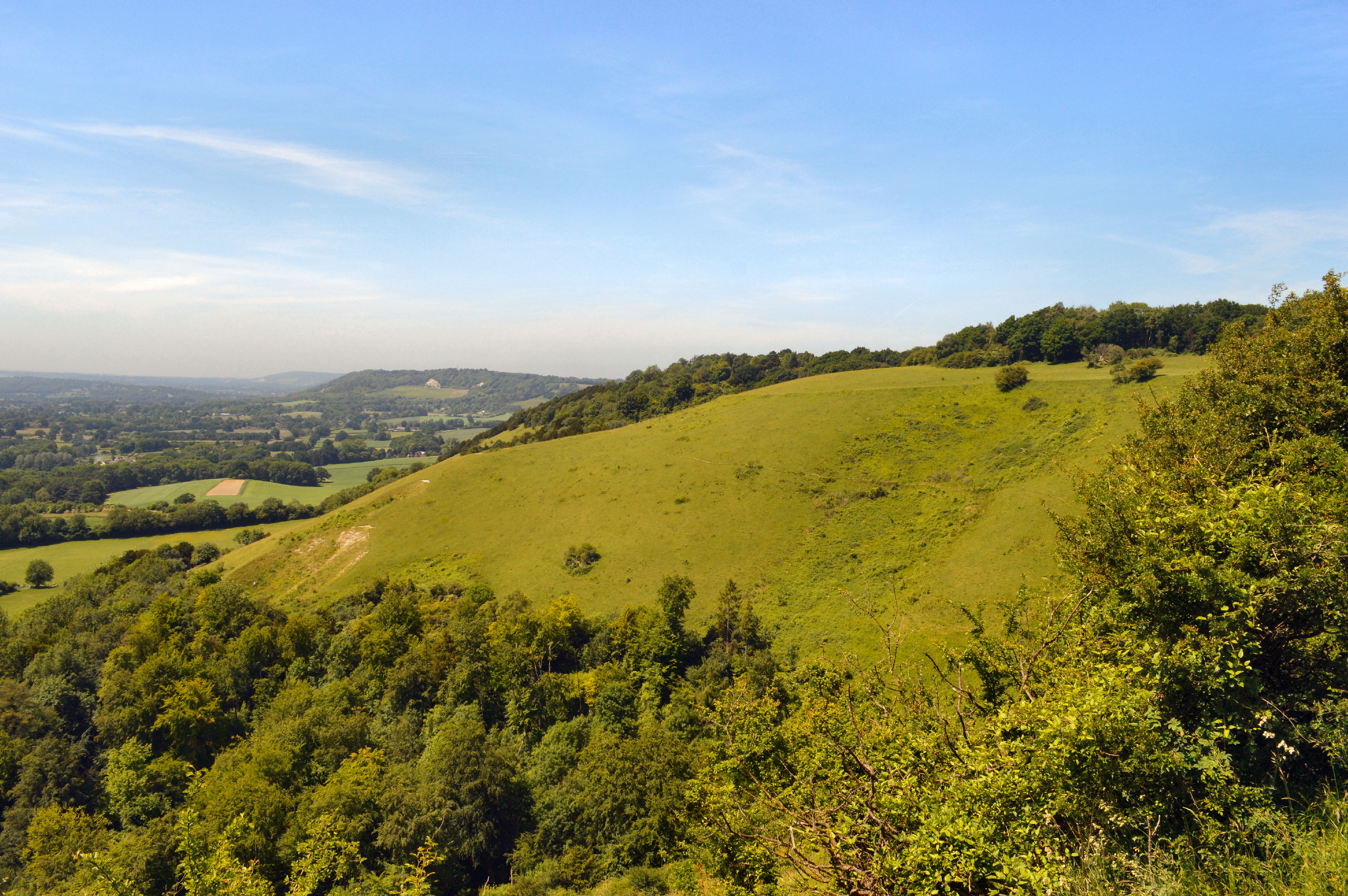
Colley Hill on the North Downs Way

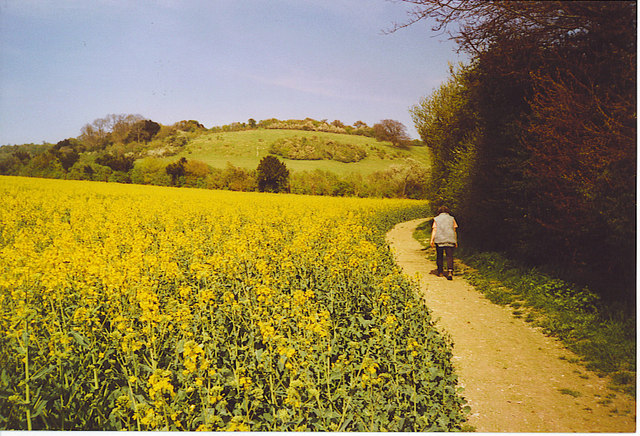
Heading up Hollingbourne Downs

The North Downs Way is a 153 mi (246 km) long-distance path in South East England. It runs west–east along the North Downs, the range of chalk hills after which it is named, from Farnham in Surrey to Dover in Kent. The trail divides near Wye, offering two different routes to Dover, one via Folkestone and the other via Canterbury. The path opened in stages from May 1972, and its completion was marked by a formal ceremony in September 1978. The North Downs Way is one of 15 National Trails in England and Wales, and is supported by the UK government through Natural England. Much of the route passes through the Surrey Hills National Landscape and the Kent Downs Area of Outstanding Natural Beauty.

The official guide to the trail divides the North Downs Way into fifteen sections.

Sections of the North Downs Way
Section	Start point	Finish point	Distance	Ascent	Descent
1	Farnham	Guildford	17.7 km (11.0 mi)	203 m (666 ft)	233 m (764 ft)
2	Guildford	Westhumble	21.0 km (13.0 mi)	293 m (961 ft)	288 m (945 ft)
3	Westhumble	Merstham	16.0 km (9.9 mi)	442 m (1,450 ft)	384 m (1,260 ft)
4	Merstham	Oxted	12.8 km (8.0 mi)	311 m (1,020 ft)	249 m (817 ft)
5	Oxted	Otford	18.9 km (11.7 mi)	524 m (1,719 ft)	587 m (1,926 ft)
6	Otford	Cuxton	24.1 km (15.0 mi)	524 m (1,719 ft)	587 m (1,926 ft)
7	Cuxton	Detling	20.1 km (12.5 mi)	404 m (1,325 ft)	299 m (981 ft)
8	Detling	Lenham	14.9 km (9.3 mi)	320 m (1,050 ft)	281 m (922 ft)
9	Lenham	Wye	17.9 km (11.1 mi)	128 m (420 ft)	247 m (810 ft)
10	Wye	Etchinghill	18.1 km (11.2 mi)	396 m (1,299 ft)	303 m (994 ft)
11	Etchinghill	Boughton Lees	19.3 km (12.0 mi)	406 m (1,332 ft)	506 m (1,660 ft)
12	Boughton Lees	Chilham	9.5 km (5.9 mi)	156 m (512 ft)	171 m (561 ft)
13	Chilham	Canterbury	11.6 km (7.2 mi)	187 m (614 ft)	215 m (705 ft)
14	Canterbury	Shepherdswell	16.7 km (10.4 mi)	248 m (814 ft)	158 m (518 ft)
15	Shepherdswell	Dover	13.7 km (8.5 mi)	152 m (499 ft)	268 m (879 ft)

The pathway is mixed-category in that it varies throughout length from footpath (around 48%) status to bridleway, byway and road. Some 19% of the Way follows roads, though 75% of those are minor lanes.

== Geology ==
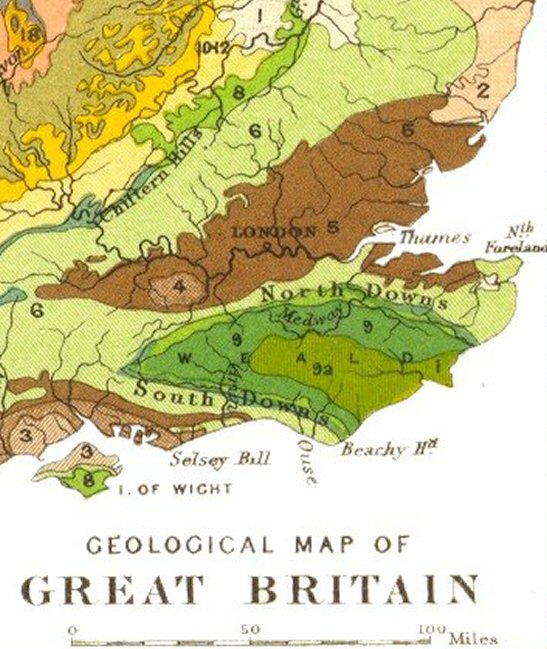
Geology of the South East: chalk is light green

As the pathway runs through the higher parts of the downland, the trail and surrounding countryside are characterised by chalk-based soil and calcareous grassland with broadleaf woodland on the upper slopes. It reflects the underlying sedimentary chalk deposits on the highest parts of the trail. There is livestock grazing on the lower slopes with clay soil and crop agriculture predominant in the valleys.

== See also ==
- Long-distance footpaths in the United Kingdom
- Hollingbourne Downs
- South Downs Way

== Bibliography ==
- Abercrombie, Patrick (1944). Greater London Plan. London: HMSO. OCLC 819267.
- Curry, Nigel (1994). Countryside Recreation, Access and Land Use Planning. ISBN 978-0-41-915550-8.
- Hobhouse, Arthur (1947). Report of the National Parks Committee (PDF). London: HMSO.
- Saunders, Colin (2016). North Downs Way. London: Aurum Press. ISBN 978-1-78-131500-2.
