= Detling Hill =

Hill in Kent, England

Coordinates: 51.29794°N 0.58625°E

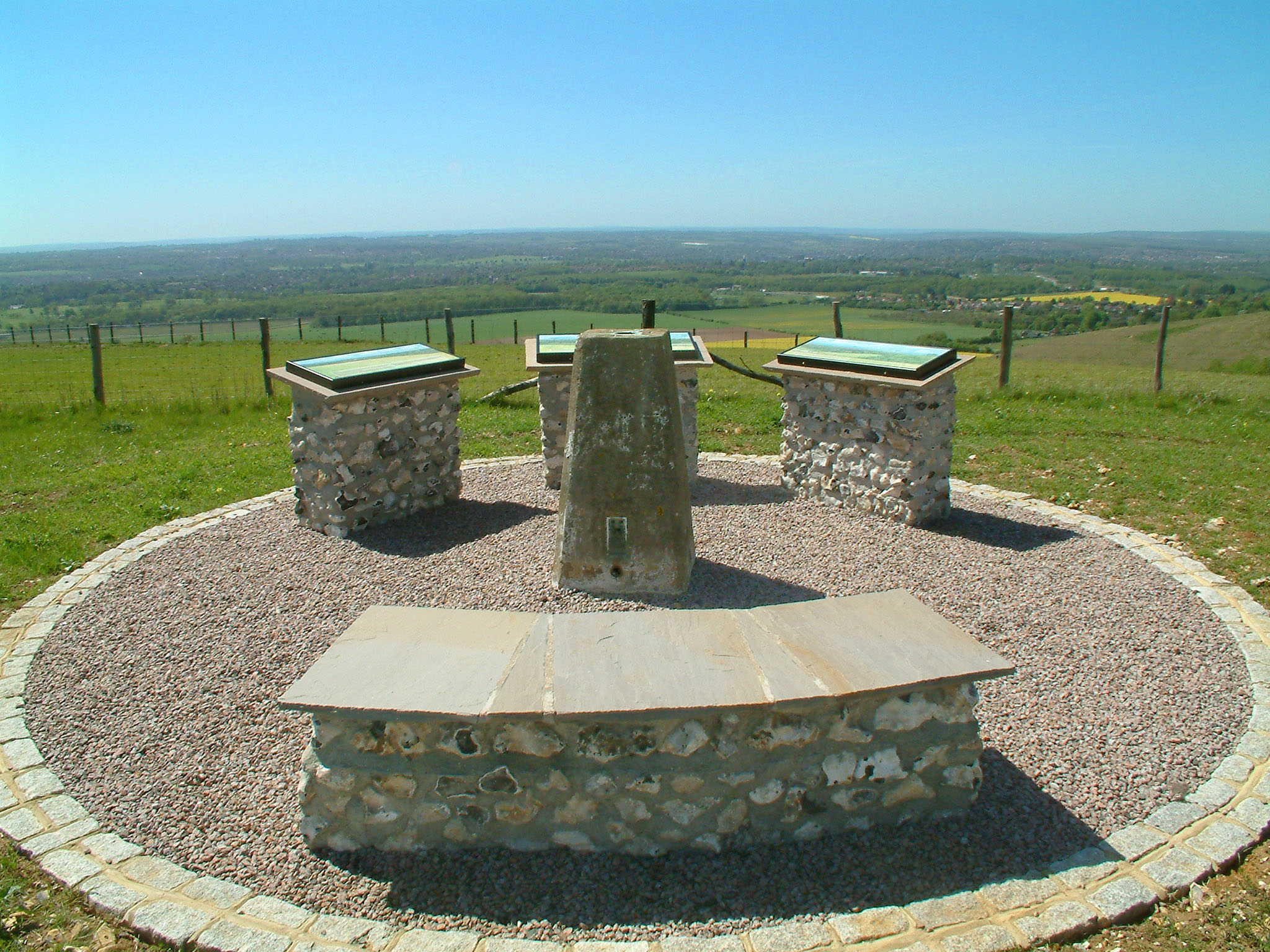
- The view south from Detling Hill

Highest point
- Elevation: 200 m (660 ft)
- Prominence: c. 163 m
- Parent peak: Leith Hill
- Listing: Marilyn

Geography
- Location: North Downs, England
- OS grid: TQ804586
- Topo map: OS Landrangers 178, 188

Detling Hill (also known as Castle Hill) is a hill forming part of the North Downs in Kent, north-east of Maidstone, and is situated in the Kent Downs Area of Outstanding Natural Beauty. The typical southern escarpment of the North Downs is found here, and produces dramatic views over the Low Weald. The North Downs Way passes along the hill just south of the summit.

The area around the summit has recently become the White Horse Wood, where over 20,000 trees (oak, ash, silver birch, wild cherry and crab apple) have been planted, and five hectares have been seeded to create an area of open grassland. The trig point has been made the centrepiece of a view-finder; the highest point is a few hundred metres away to the north-west.

Nearby are located the remains of the medieval Thurnham Castle, as well as traces of an Iron Age settlement. The name, taken from the village of Detling that sits at the foot of the hill, derives from Old English and means "Dyttel's people".
