= Botley Hill =

Hill in Surrey, England

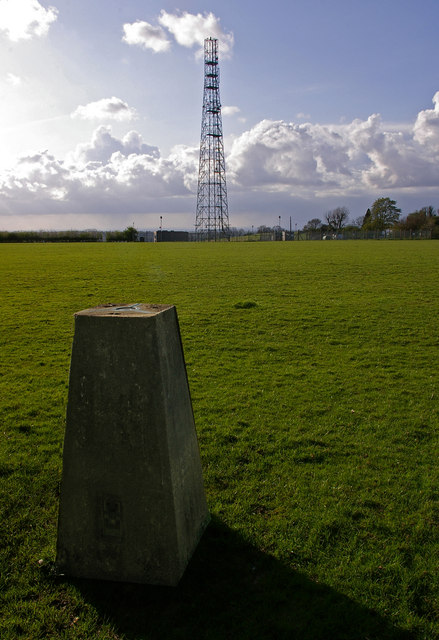

Highest point
- Elevation: 269.6 m (885 ft)
- Prominence: 209 m (686 ft)
- Parent peak: Leith Hill
- Listing: Marilyn
- Coordinates: 51°16′43.8″N 0°00′47.0″W

Geography
- Location within Surrey
- Location: Surrey, England
- Parent range: North Downs
- OS grid: TQ387551
- Topo map: OS Landranger 187

Botley Hill is a hill in Surrey and is the highest point of the North Downs, with a height of 269.6 metres (885 ft). The Prime Meridian crosses the hill.

== Geography ==
Botley Hill is a Marilyn (a hill with topographic prominence of at least 150m), and the third highest point in the county (after the peaks of Leith Hill south of Dorking and Gibbet Hill in Hindhead, both on the Greensand Ridge).

Botley Hill was a main surveying point for the Anglo-French Survey (1784–1790) which sought to precisely measure the relative positions of the Royal Greenwich Observatory and the Paris Observatory. This task was led by General William Roy. By coincidence Botley Hill lies due south of the Greenwich Observatory, as the Prime Meridian of the world passes over the top of the hill, just to the west of the summit.

The summit lies at the edge of a water tower enclosure to the north of The Ridge, less than 1 km from the North Downs Way. Previously the location of the Marilyn was given as the 267 metres (876 ft) trig point at TQ396553 as this is the highest point marked on current maps. However, the 1965 1" Ordnance Survey map shows a spot height of 882 feet at the site of the present water tower. A levelling survey confirmed the new location. To the south is Oxted, which is the nearest railway station.

It can be seen from the highest points in Croydon, skyscrapers in London, and for example from Alexandra Palace, Stanmore Hill, Primrose Hill, Highgate and Hampstead on the opposite side of the Thames Basin.
