= North Downs =

Range of hills in south east England

Coordinates: 51°16′N 0°30′W

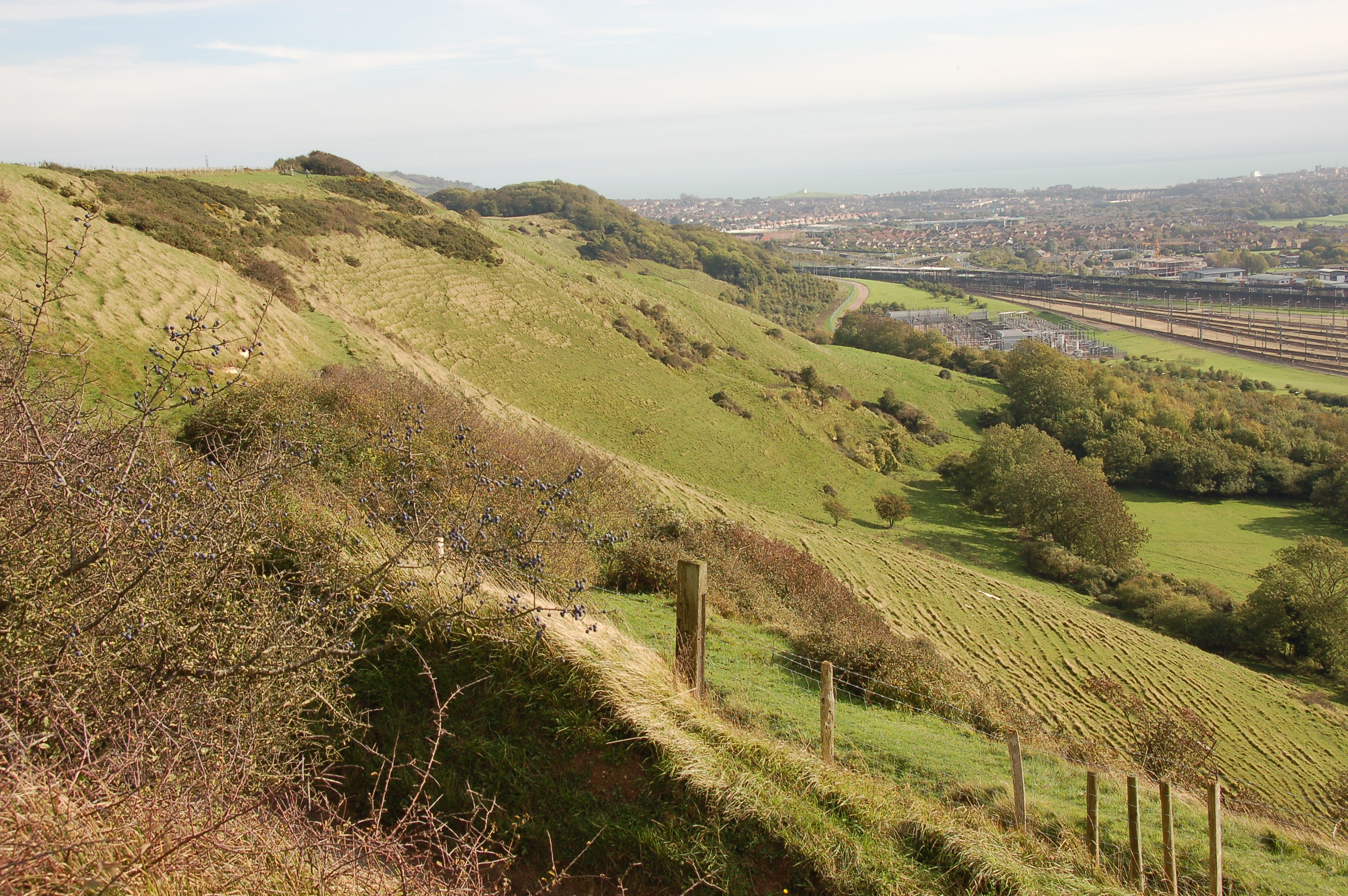
- The North Downs near the entrance to the Channel Tunnel in Folkestone

Highest point
- Peak: Botley Hill
- Elevation: 270 m (890 ft)

Naming
- Etymology: Old English dūn, meaning 'hill'

Geography
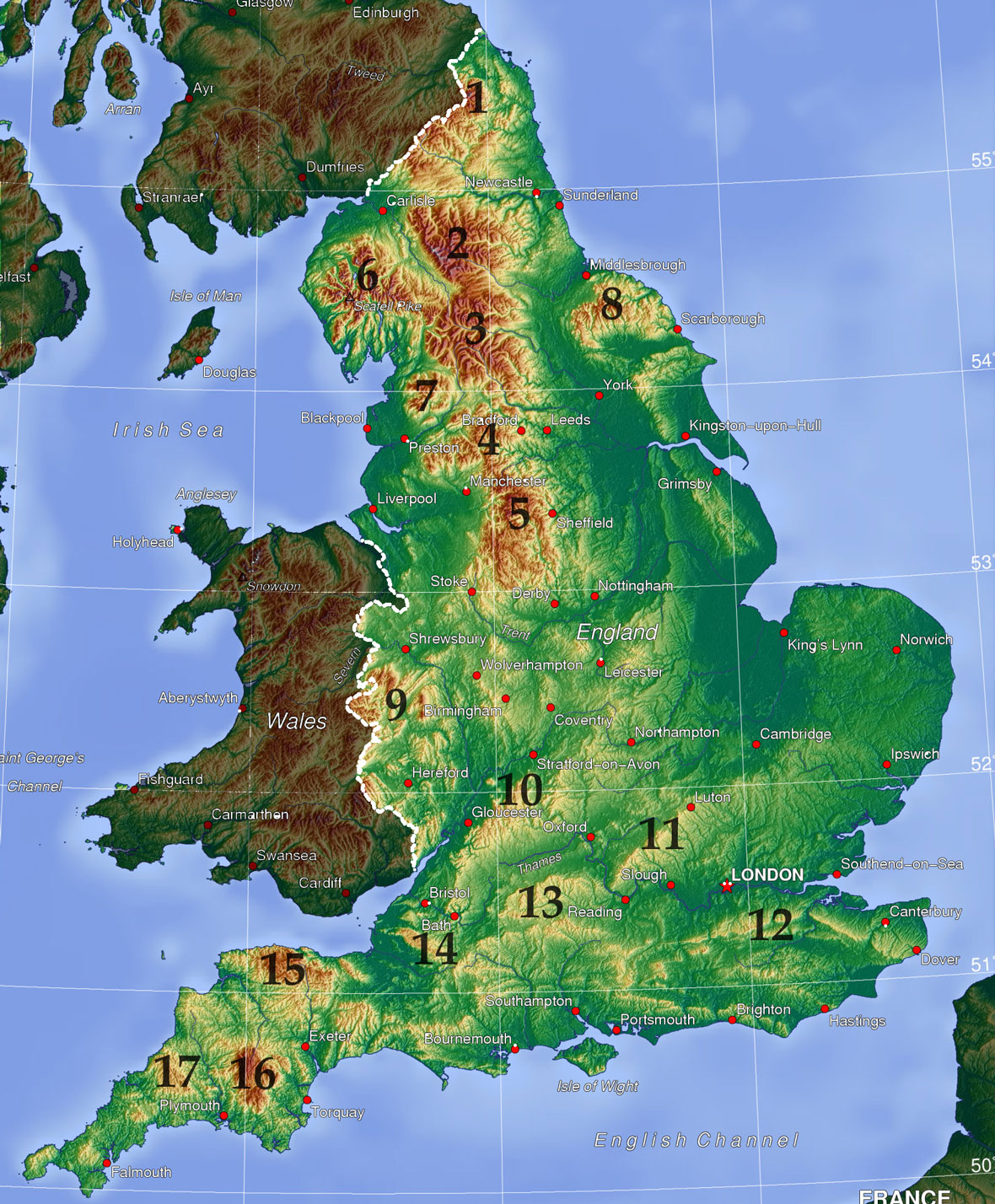
- Topographic map of England, with the North Downs being labelled "12"
- Country: England (United Kingdom)
- Region(s): Surrey, Kent
- Parent range: Southern England Chalk Formation

Geology
- Orogeny: Alpine orogeny
- Rock age: Cretaceous
- Rock type: chalk

The North Downs are a ridge of chalk hills and an area of downland in south-east England, that stretch from Farnham in Surrey to the White Cliffs of Dover in Kent. Much of the North Downs comprises two Areas of Outstanding Natural Beauty (AONBs): the Surrey Hills and the Kent Downs. The North Downs Way National Trail runs along the North Downs from Farnham to Dover. They form the northern boundary of the Weald, which is correspondingly bounded to the south by the South Downs.

The highest point in the North Downs is Botley Hill, Surrey (270 metres (890 ft) above sea level). The County Top of Kent is Betsom's Hill (251 m (823 ft) above sea level), which is less than 1 km from Westerham Heights, Bromley, the highest point in Greater London at an elevation of 245 m (804 ft).

== Toponymy ==
This term is used to describe the characteristic landscape of 'elevated rolling grassy hills' in southern England, where chalk and limestone is exposed at the surface, acquiring this sense around the 14th century. The name "downs" is derived from the Celtic word "dun", meaning "fort" or "fastness" (and by extension "fortified settlement", from which it entered English as "town", similar to Germanic "burg"/"burough"), though the original meaning would have been "hill", as early forts were commonly hillforts - compare Germanic "burg" (fort) and "berg" (mountain). These hills are prefixed 'North' to distinguish them from a similar range of hills – the South Downs – which runs roughly parallel to them but some 50 km (31 mi) away on the southern edge of the Weald that divides the two ranges of hills.

== Geography ==
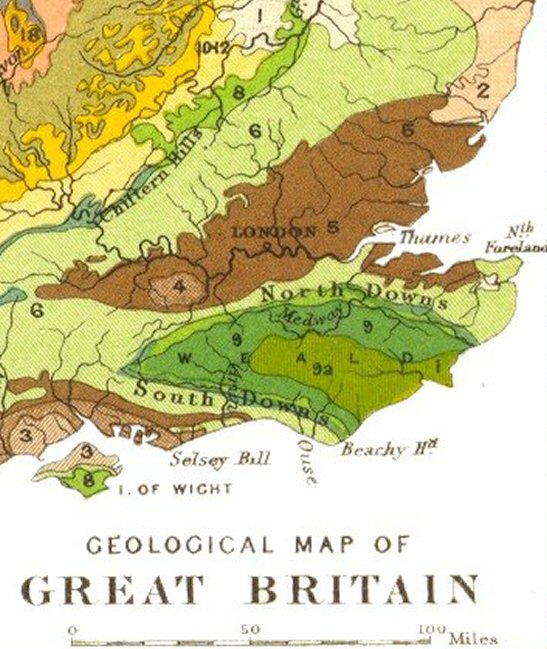
Geology of the South East, chalk is light green (6)

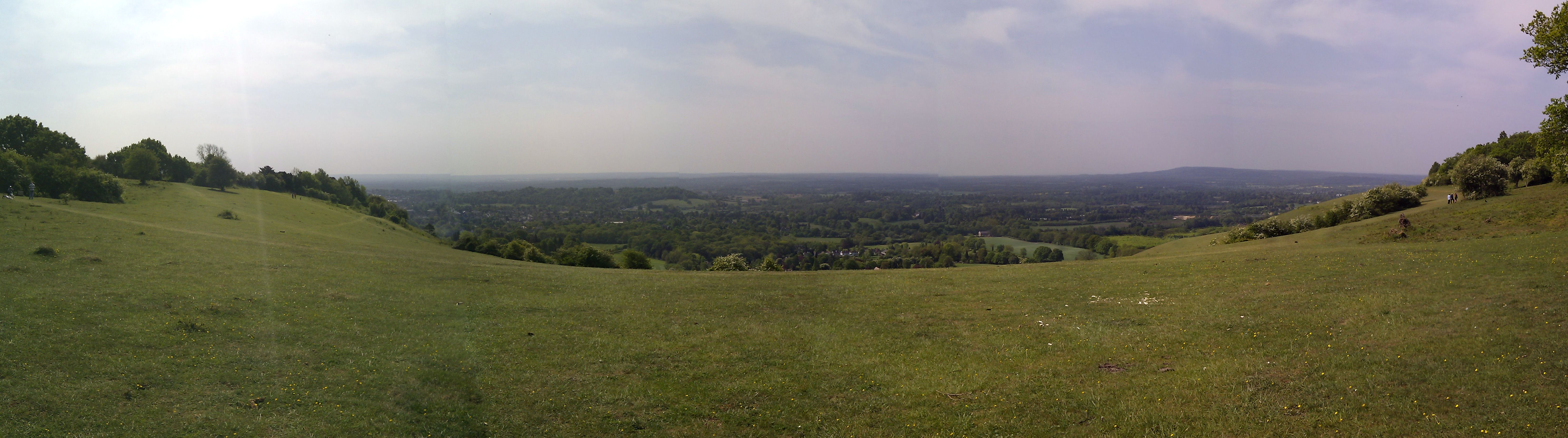
View from North Downs towards Reigate

The narrow spine of the Hog's Back between Farnham and Guildford forms the western extremity of the North Downs, whilst the cliffs between Folkestone and Deal terminate the ridge in the east. The North Downs cuesta has a steep south-facing scarp slope and a more gentle north-facing dip slope. Its southern boundary is defined by the low-lying Vale of Holmesdale at the foot of the escarpment, in which the underlying stratum is primarily gault clay. The northern boundary is less apparent but occurs where the chalk submerges below the more recent Paleocene deposits.

The Downs are highest near the Kent–Surrey border, often reaching heights in excess of 200 m (660 ft) above sea level at the crest of the escarpment. The highest point is Botley Hill in Surrey at 269 m (883 ft). The County top of Kent at Betsom's Hill, with a height of 251 m (823 ft), is nearby, and the highest point in Greater London, Westerham Heights, at 245 m (804 ft), is on the northern side of the same hill. East of the Medway Valley the Downs become broader and flatter, extending as far as the Isle of Thanet.

The ridge of the North Downs is intersected by the valleys of a series of rivers: the Wey, Mole, Darent, Medway and Stour. These drain much of the Weald to the south. The western rivers are tributaries of the Thames; they have carved steep valleys through the chalk and provide natural corridor routes. In addition to existing rivers, the Downs are crossed by a number of wind gaps – prehistoric river valleys no longer occupied by rivers – including those at Farnham, Betchworth, Caterham, Lyminge and Hawkinge. Except for the river valleys and wind gaps, the crest of the escarpment is almost continuous along its length. The dip slope is dissected by many small dry valleys, and in the broad eastern part in Kent, by further river valleys such as that of the Little Stour.

Leith Hill (the highest point in Surrey) is sometimes incorrectly referred to as part of the North Downs, but it is located on the parallel Greensand Ridge and does not consist of chalk.

== Geology ==
=== Rock types ===
The Downland of the North Downs consists of distinct lithostratigraphic units (the types of strata, the names of which are always capitalised):

- Shallow layers of sand and gravel are associated with areas of heathland, including at Headley and Netley Heaths in Surrey. These deposits have their origin in the Quaternary and indicate the position of the sea shore during this period.
- Clay-with-Flints, a sandy clay with many flints is found on higher ground. The origins of this layer are uncertain, however the clay is thought to have been formed during several periods of glaciation and was produced by cryoturbation and decalcification of the chalk. This hypothesis is supported by the presence of flint, which is also found in the underlying strata.

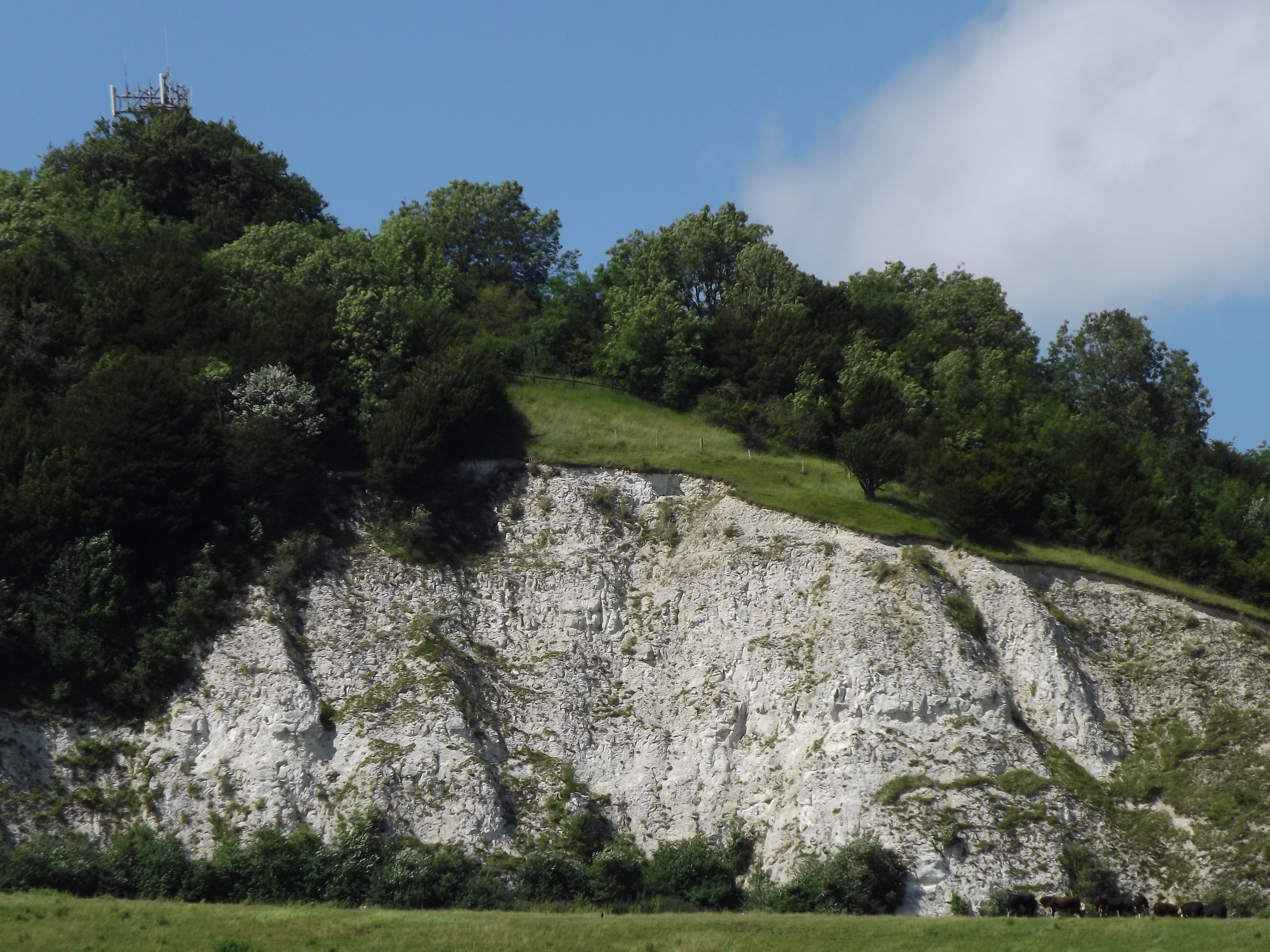
The exposed chalk workings of the former Betchworth Quarry on the south-facing scarp slope of Box Hill.

- The Chalk Group, composed almost entirely of chalk, a soft, fine-grained limestone. These strata have their origins in the late Cretaceous (approximately 100 – 66 million years ago). For the entirety of this period, south east England was covered by a warm, shallow sea in which coccolithophores, single-celled algae with small calcite skeletons, thrived. As the phytoplankton died, their calcium-rich shells were deposited on the sea bed and, over time were compressed to form rock. The chalk of the North Downs is generally divided into three distinct stata: The Upper Chalk, which has many flints; the Middle Chalk, with fewer flints; and the Lower Chalk or Coombe Rock, greyish, with few flints. The chalk is most commonly exposed on slopes or as cliffs, where the overlying acidic strata have been quarried or washed away. The buried upper surface of the chalk beneath the acidic strata is often eroded into pipes, gulleys and pinnacles, sometimes visible in road cuttings and quarries.
- The Upper Greensand Formation, a whitish, limy sandstone, often used for building, for which it has been mined from beneath the chalk (for example from the Godstone Baby Mines). The Upper Greensand of the North Downs is a thin bed of one or two metres thickness, and it is rarely visible at the surface (it is much thicker elsewhere).

=== Wealden uplift and erosion ===
A cross-section, showing the Weald Anticline, and relating it to the towns of Kent

Following the Cretaceous, the sea covering the south of England began to retreat and the land was pushed higher. The Weald (the area covering modern day south Surrey, south Kent and north Sussex) was lifted by the same geological processes that created the Alps, resulting in an anticline which stretched across the English Channel to the Artois region of northern France. Initially an island, this dome-like structure was drained by the ancestors of the rivers which today cut through the North and South Downs. The dome was eroded away over the course of the Cenozoic, exposing the strata beneath and resulting in the escarpments of the Downs.

Chalk is a relatively soft rock that may be eroded or weathered in a number of different ways. It is porous, absorbing up to 20% of its dry weight in water, and is therefore highly susceptible to weathering by freeze-thaw action, which may occur over repeated annual or diurnal cycles. This frost weathering produces a mix of rubble and viscous mud, which may be washed downhill, further eroding the landscape (a process known as solifluction). Since chalk contains a very high percentage of calcium carbonate, it can be dissolved by both groundwater and rainwater.

Across much of the North Downs, the chalk dips below the London Clay at a relatively shallow angle (c. 18° near Dorking), however at the far west of the range, local faulting has produced a much steeper angle (up to 55°), resulting in the distinctive Hog's Back between Farnham and Guildford.

== Ecology ==
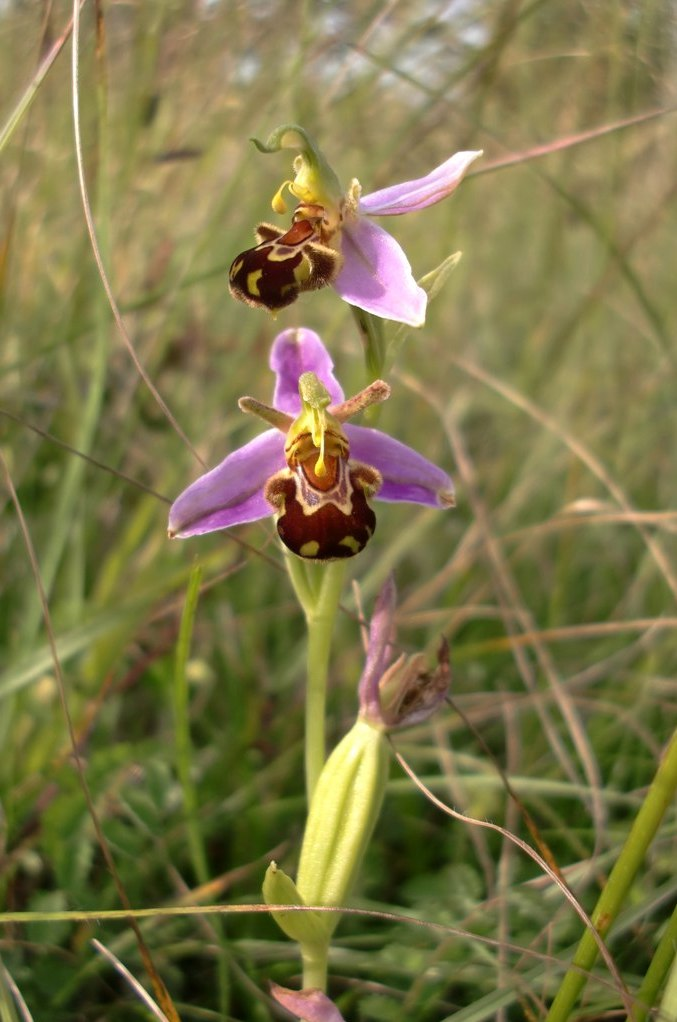
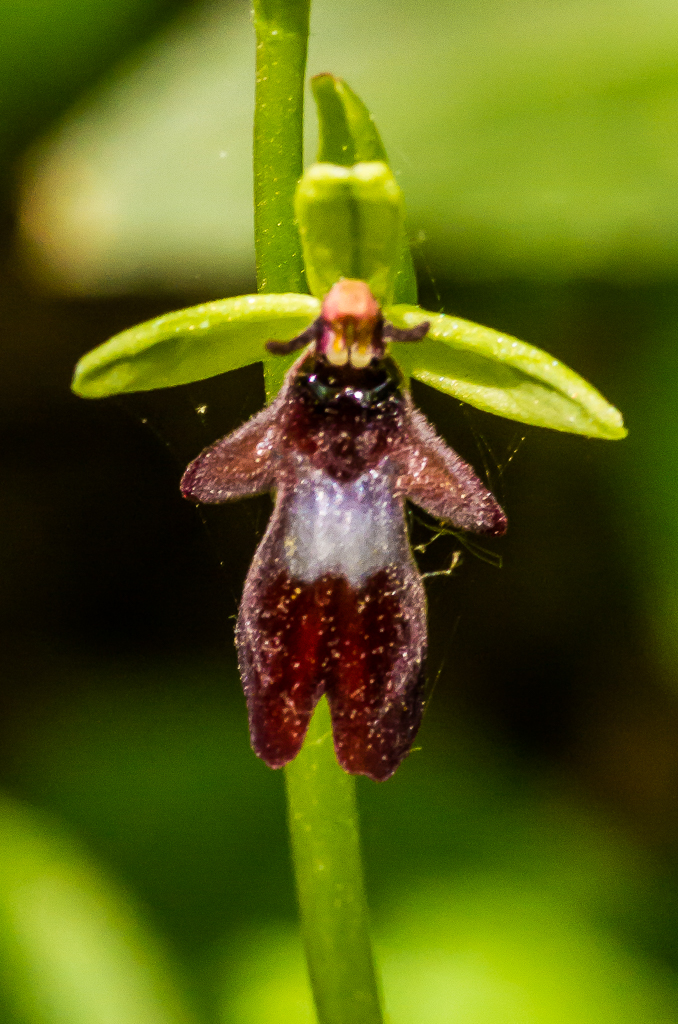
Bee (left) and fly orchids (right) growing on the south-facing scarp slope of the North Downs in Surrey.

The North Downs support several important habitats including chalk grassland, scrub, woodland and chalk heath.

=== Chalk grassland ===
Chalk grassland is found on the steep south-facing scarp slopes and the more gently graded north-facing dip slopes, where woodland is absent. The alkaline soils are thin and nutrient poor, which prevents deeper-rooted lush grasses (with a high water demand) from dominating. Each square metre of chalk downland may support up to 40 different species. This semi-natural habitat is maintained through sheep, cattle and rabbit grazing which prevents scrub encroachment. Chalk grassland to the west of the Medway Valley is dominated by upright brome and fescue, whilst grassland to the east is dominated by tor-grass. Owing to the close proximity of the North Downs to the European continent, the warm climate and the south-facing escarpment, several plant species survive on the chalk grassland which are scarce or not found elsewhere in the British Isles.

The nationally rare late spider orchid is limited within the British Isles to chalk grassland between Folkestone and Wye. One of the two native British sites for the nationally rare monkey orchid is on the North Downs. The nationally scarce man orchid is not uncommon on chalk grassland on the Downs in Surrey and Kent. Other scarce plant species such as early gentian, dwarf milkwort and bedstraw broomrape also occur on chalk grassland in the North Downs.

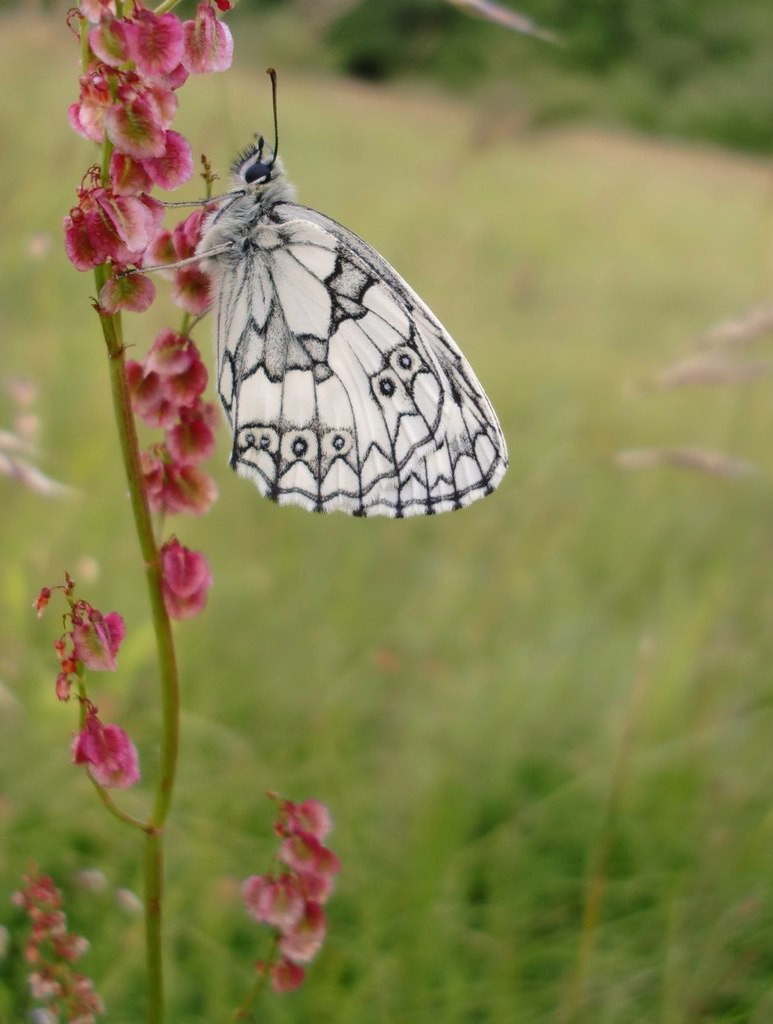
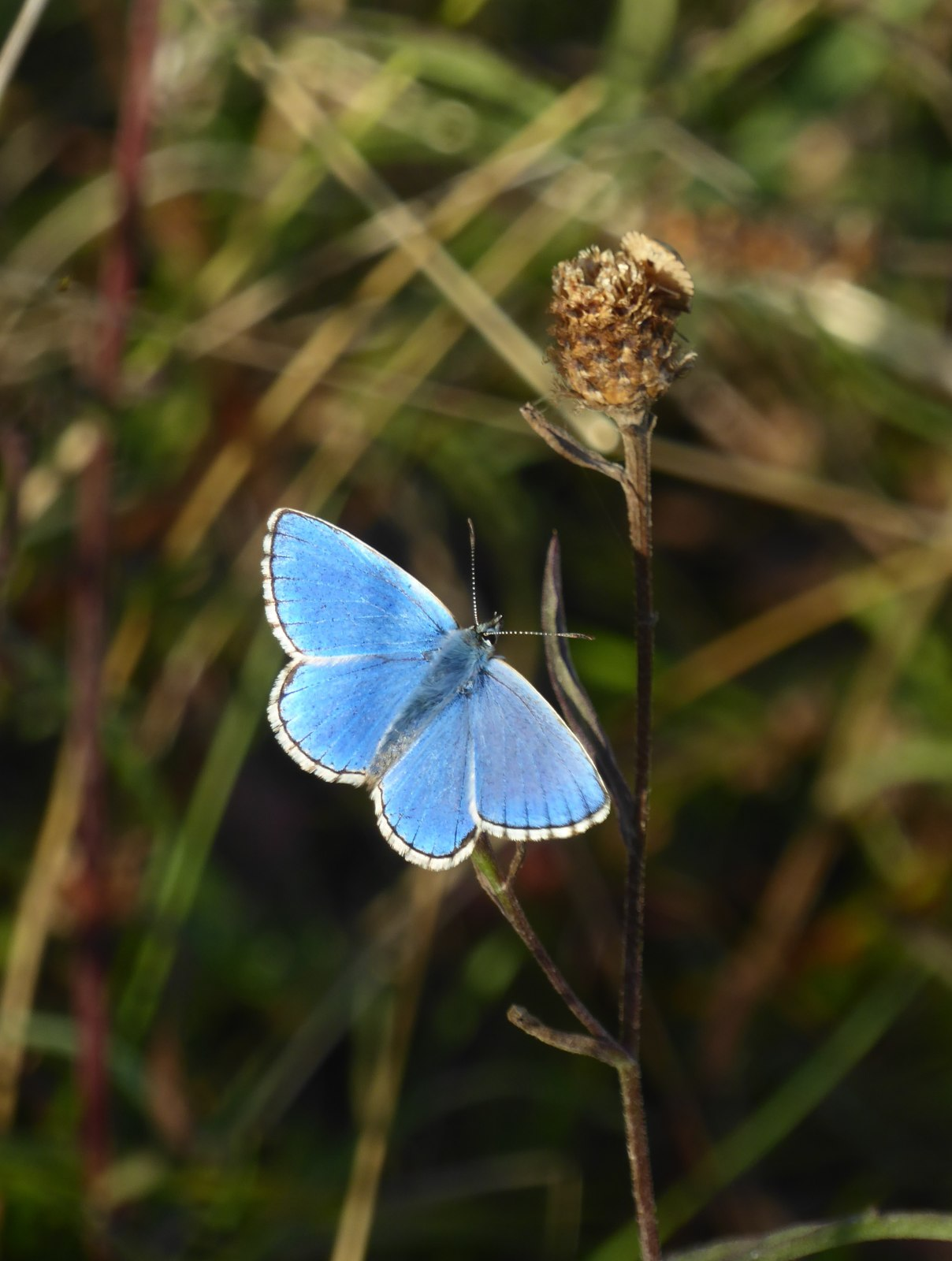
Marbled white (left) and Adonis blue (right) butterflies photographed at Denbies Hillside (part of the Hackhurst and White Downs SSSI) near Dorking.

Chalk grassland also supports a rich fauna, particularly insects. Notable butterfly species include Adonis blue and silver-spotted skipper, which may be found on warm, sheltered, south-facing slopes. The chalk downland above the Stour Valley is the only British site for the black-veined moth. Other notable moth species that occur on the North Downs include the fiery clearwing moth and the straw belle moth.

=== Quarries and chalk cliffs ===
On the summit of the cliffs between Deal and Folkestone the early spider orchid occurs in large numbers, as well as the rare oxtongue broomrape. Naturally exposed chalk is rare inland with the exception of the river cliffs formed by the River Mole on the west face of Box Hill and at Ham Bank in Norbury Park. However, quarry lakes within chalk pits provide habitats for great crested newt. The scarce musk orchid has colonised disused chalk pits near Hollingbourne in Kent.

=== Woodland ===
Woodland was far more extensive on the North Downs prior to human clearance 5000 to 4000 years ago. Fragments still remain particularly where the layer of clay-with-flints overlying the chalk has inhibited clearance. Where this is the case species such as pedunculate oak predominate, although much woodland has been replanted with conifer and sweet chestnut.

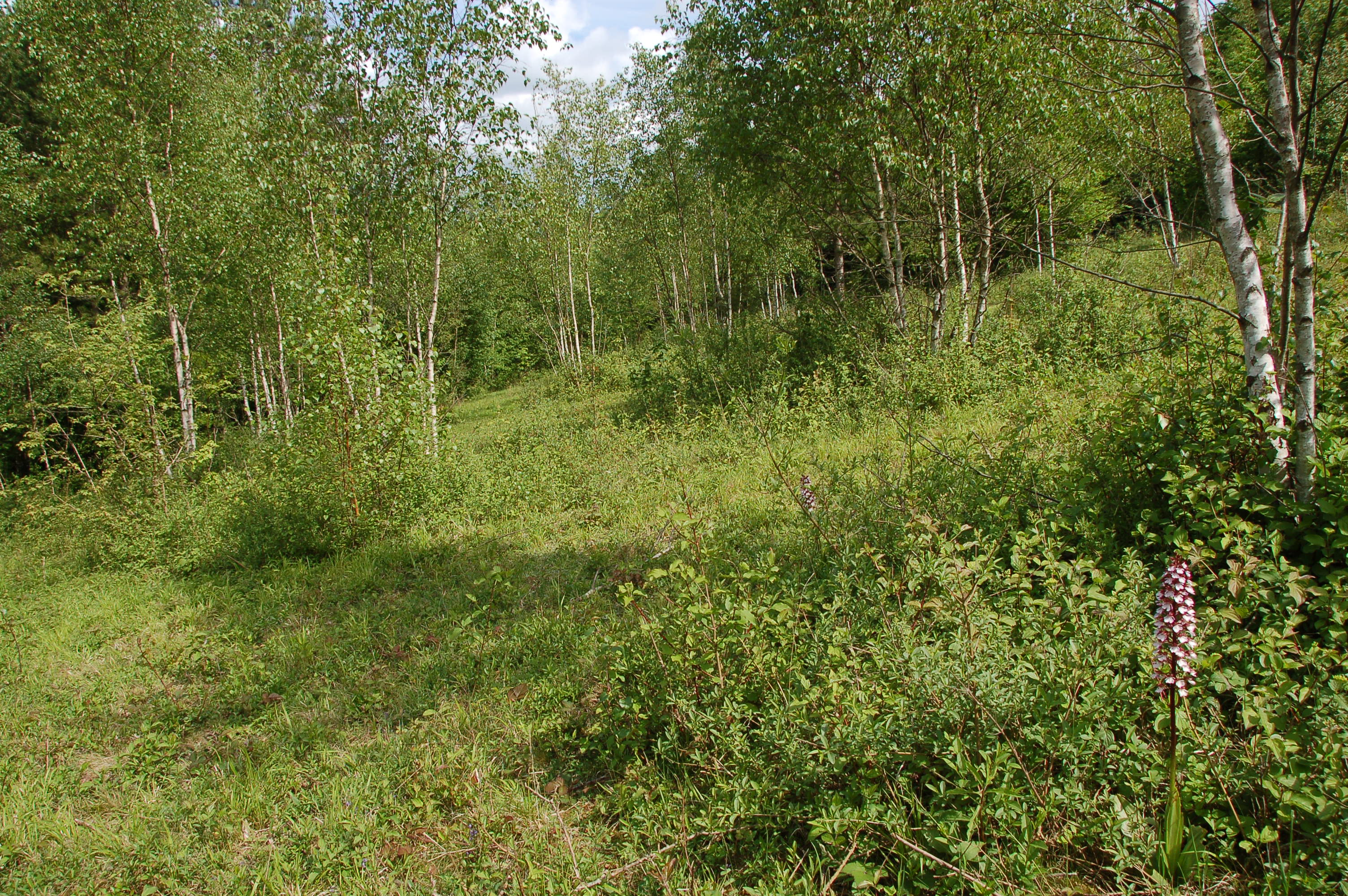
Lady orchids growing in calcareous woodland and scrub, Denge Wood.

Calcareous woodland occurs on thin soils where chalk is close to the surface. These conditions are most often found on the escarpment of the North Downs and on valley slopes, but may also occur on the plateau of the dip slope. Calcareous woodland is typically dominated by beech, hornbeam, yew and ash. Box Hill has one of the largest areas of native box woodland in England. One notable species characteristic of calcareous woodland is the nationally scarce lady orchid, which is found in more than 100 sites on the Kent stretch of the North Downs, but is confined to just two sites elsewhere in the UK.

=== Scrub ===
Although its spread is often considered undesirable, scrub provides valuable habitat for a range of invertebrates, including the Roman snail, rufous grasshopper and the dark green fritillary.

=== Chalk heath ===
In Surrey, superficial deposits from the Quaternary are found overlying the chalk. These sands and gravels indicate the position of a former sea shore. Where these deposits occur, they are thin and the chalk also comes to the surface in the same areas (e.g. Headley Heath on the north east side of Box Hill), allowing acid-loving plants to thrive alongside those that prefer alkaline conditions, producing the rare chalk heath habitat.

== History ==
Worked flints and human and animal remains dating from the Lower Paleolithic, about 400,000 years ago, were discovered at Barnfield Pit near Swanscombe; this provides the earliest evidence of human occupation in the North Downs. It is suggested that human activity at that time coincided with intermittent warm phases during the last glacial period and that continuous occupation of the Downs did not occur until warming after the glaciation. Flint axes have also been found on river terraces at Farnham, on Walton and Banstead Heaths and on the crest of the escarpment above Folkestone. There is considerable evidence of Mesolithic activity in the Surrey Downs through the discovery of pit-dwellings at Weston Woods near Albury and the quantity of discarded tools, microliths and other implements discovered.

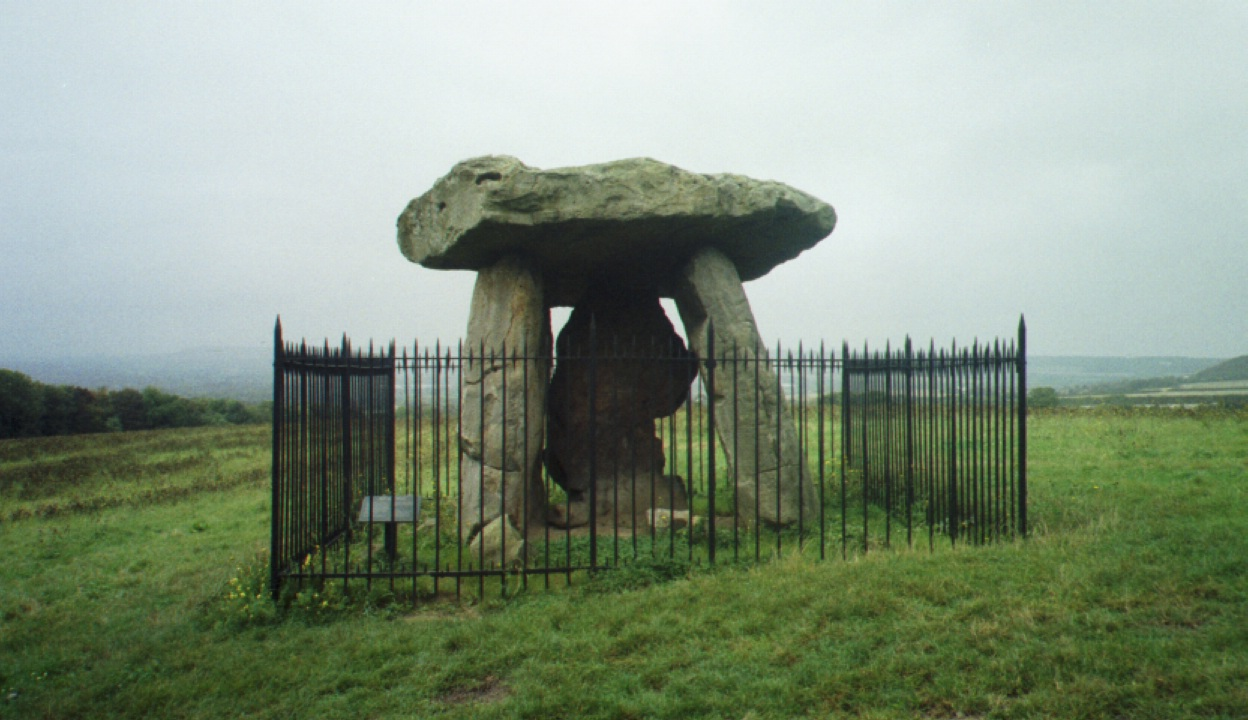
Kit's Coty House, a chambered long barrow near Aylesford, Kent, was constructed circa 4000 BCE.

In about 3000 BC the emergence of Neolithic culture saw the lifestyle of the Mesolithic hunter-gatherers shift to a more sedentary and communal lifestyle that relied upon the keeping of livestock and the growing of crops. There is substantial evidence of Neolithic activity within the North Downs, notably the long barrows concentrated in the Medway and Stour valleys. The Medway long barrows, which include Kit's Coty House and Coldrum Stones, are constructed of sarsen stone, locally found on Blue Bell Hill and in the valleys of the dip slope, whilst the Stour Valley long barrows are constructed of earth.

== Agriculture and industry ==
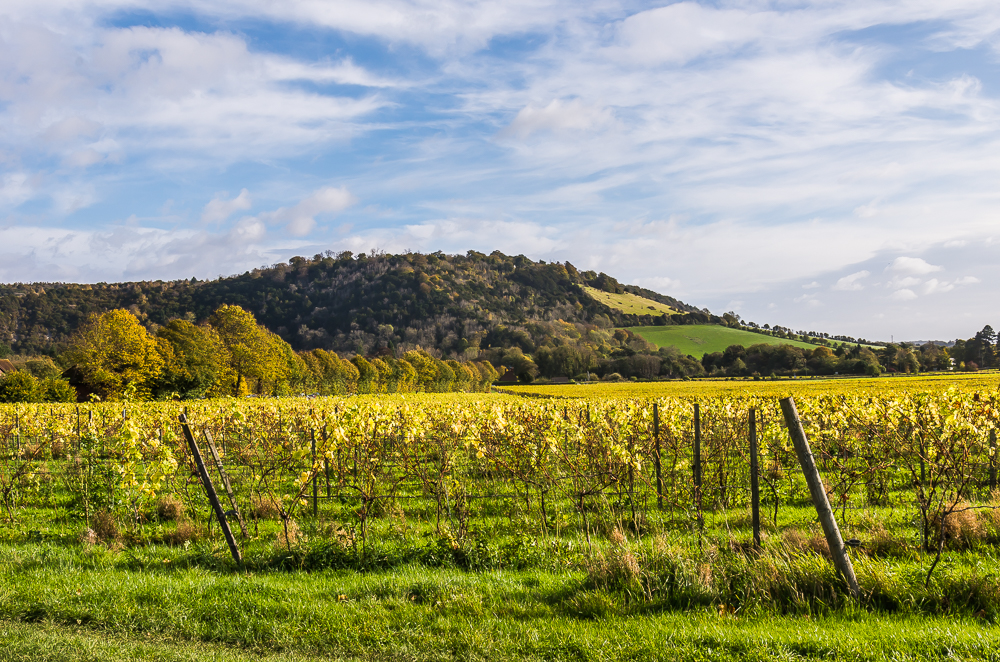
Looking east across Denbies Wine Estate towards Box Hill near Dorking, Surrey.

The landscape of the Downs has been greatly shaped by man. There has been deforestation of the Downs for centuries. The woodland that remains today is largely located where deforestation has been inhibited by steep slopes or by the layer of clay with flints, which is difficult to plough. Because of the many small farms that have survived on the Downs, a network of narrow lanes and minor roads has developed. This has resulted in a landscape similar to that found in Normandy known as bocage. The predominant type of farming on the Downs is arable farming; this increased greatly during the 20th century. Pastoral farming also occurs but to a lesser extent. Human settlements within the Downs have generally formed in sheltered valleys and at the foot of the scarp slope (known as spring line settlements). In recent years vineyards have been planted along the southern slopes of the Downs, in particular the Denbies Wine Estate, Dorking, which is the largest vineyard in the country, accounting for 10% of the country's vines. The chalky soils are similar to those of the Champagne region.

There is plenty of evidence of chalk extraction on the Downs, particularly along the scarp slope. Oil has been drilled at the foot of the Downs in several locations in Surrey. The Kent Coalfield was established in the late 19th century after coal was found in 1890. Four successful collieries continued to be worked through much of the 20th century: Betteshanger, Snowdown, Tilmanstone and Chislet; Bettershanger was the last to close in 1989. The east to west ridge of the Downs has provided a natural transport route for centuries. Much of the historic Pilgrims' Way still survives at the foot of the scarp slope, and this has been joined much more recently by the M20 motorway. The scarp slope has also been used for fortification; many examples of this still exist, such as Thurnham Castle and on Castle Hill, Folkestone Castle Hill near Folkestone.

== Places of interest ==
Many beauty spots on the North Downs are owned by the National Trust, for instance Box Hill and Langdon Cliffs. Other areas of interest are Newland's Corner, Wye Downs and the Hog's Back. Much chalk grassland and ancient woodland on the Downs is open-access, and there are also many historic sites such as Kit's Coty House (near Maidstone) and Dover Castle.

== Hills ==
The topography of the North Downs means there are relatively few summits with topographic prominence. Below is a list of summits on the North Downs which are more than 180 metres in height with 30 metres of topographic prominence (a commonly used threshold in Britain). The summits are arranged in order along the range, from west to east.

Hill	Height (m)	Prominence (m)	OS grid reference
Dunley Hill	227	105	TQ104490
Box Hill	224	53	TQ203517
Reigate Hill	235	100	TQ255520
White Hill	233	30	TQ328532
Gravelly Hill	237	64	TQ337532
Winders Hill	236	47	TQ353540
Botley Hill	270	209	TQ387551
Wrotham Hill	235	129	TQ593600
Detling Hill	200	163	TQ804586
West Down	186	73	TR091453
Tolsford Hill	183	61	TR159386
Cheriton Hill	188	150	TR197396

== Photo gallery ==
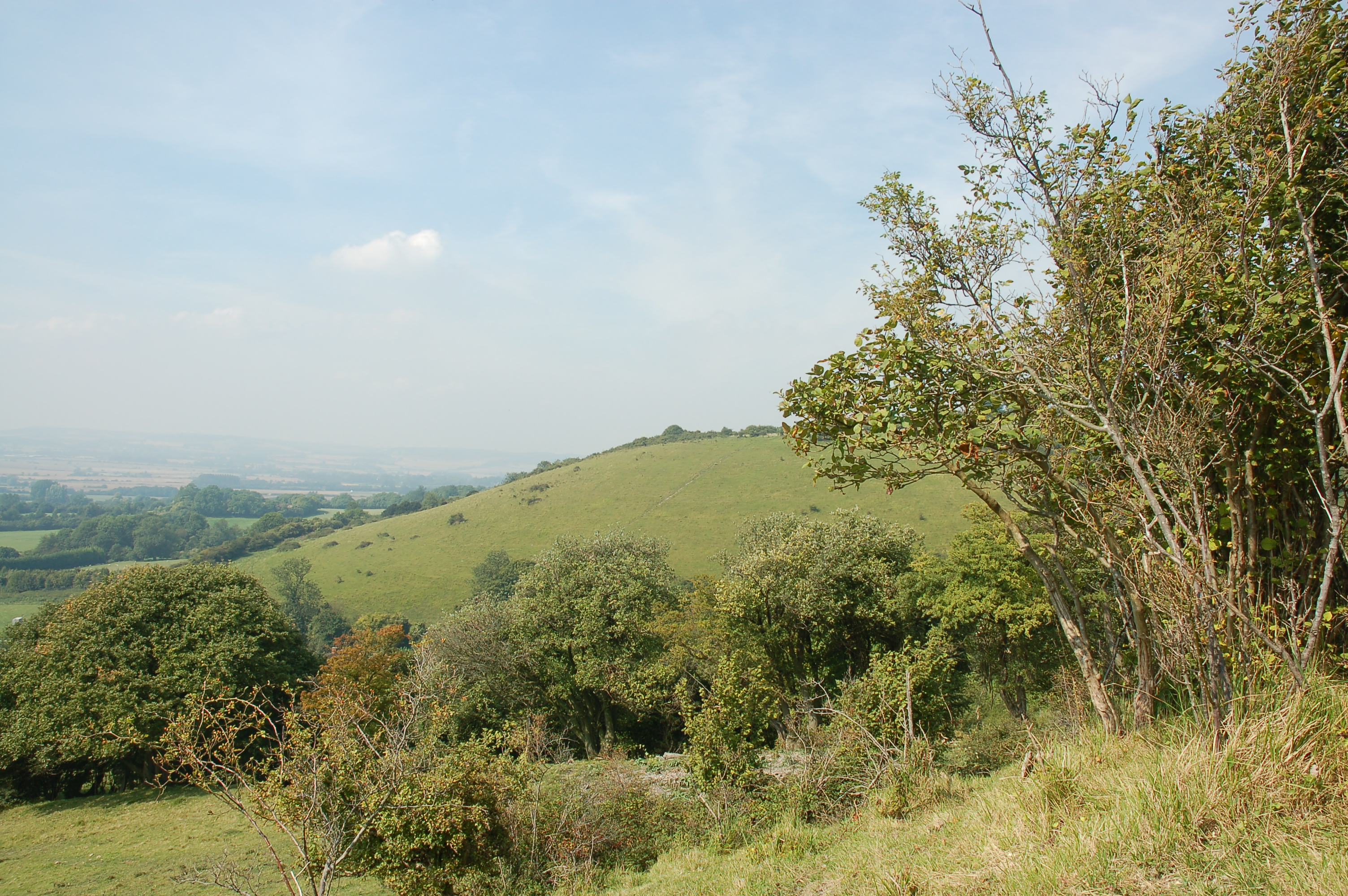
The North Downs at the Wye Downs National Nature Reserve

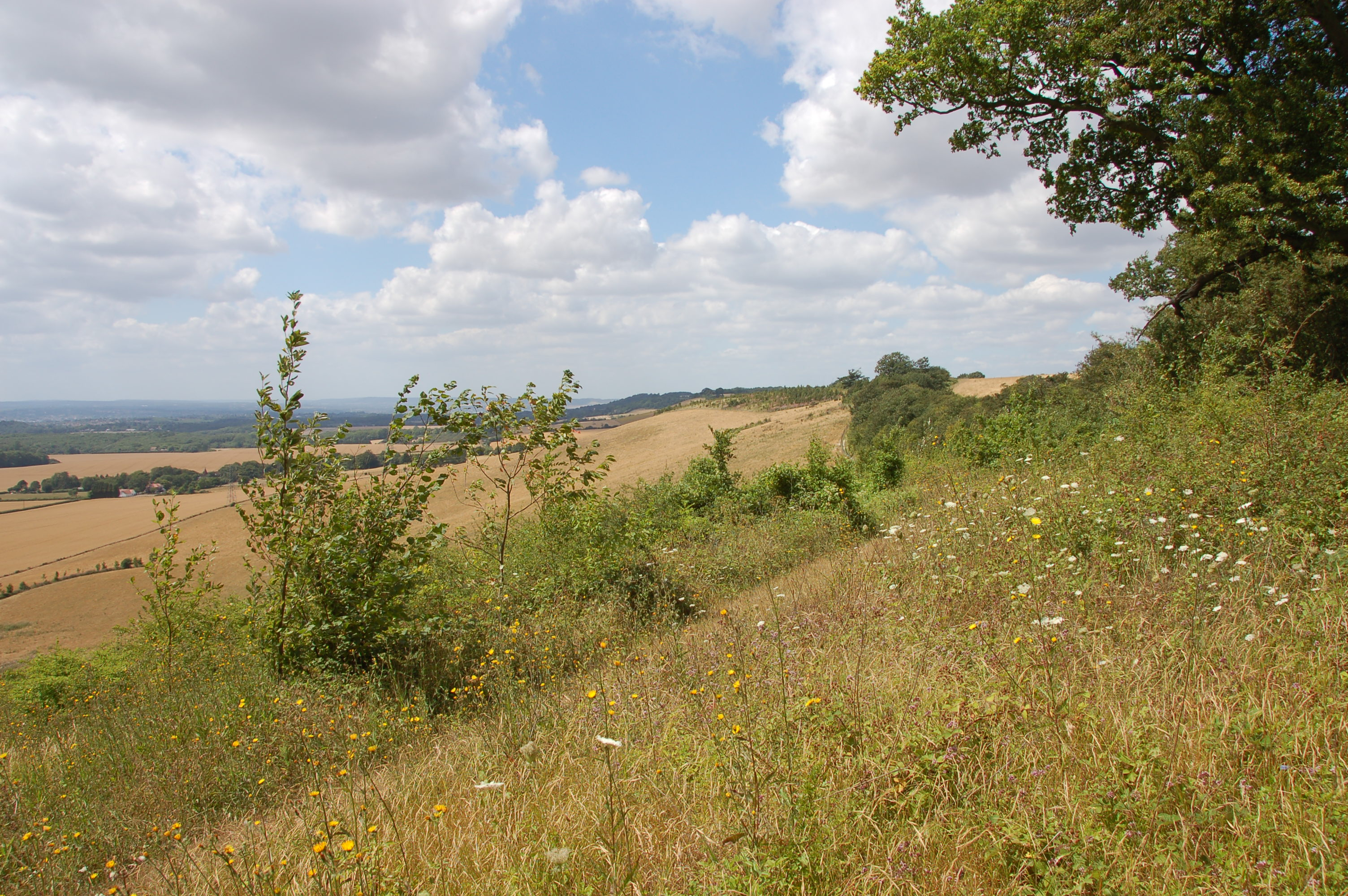
The North Downs above Hollingbourne.

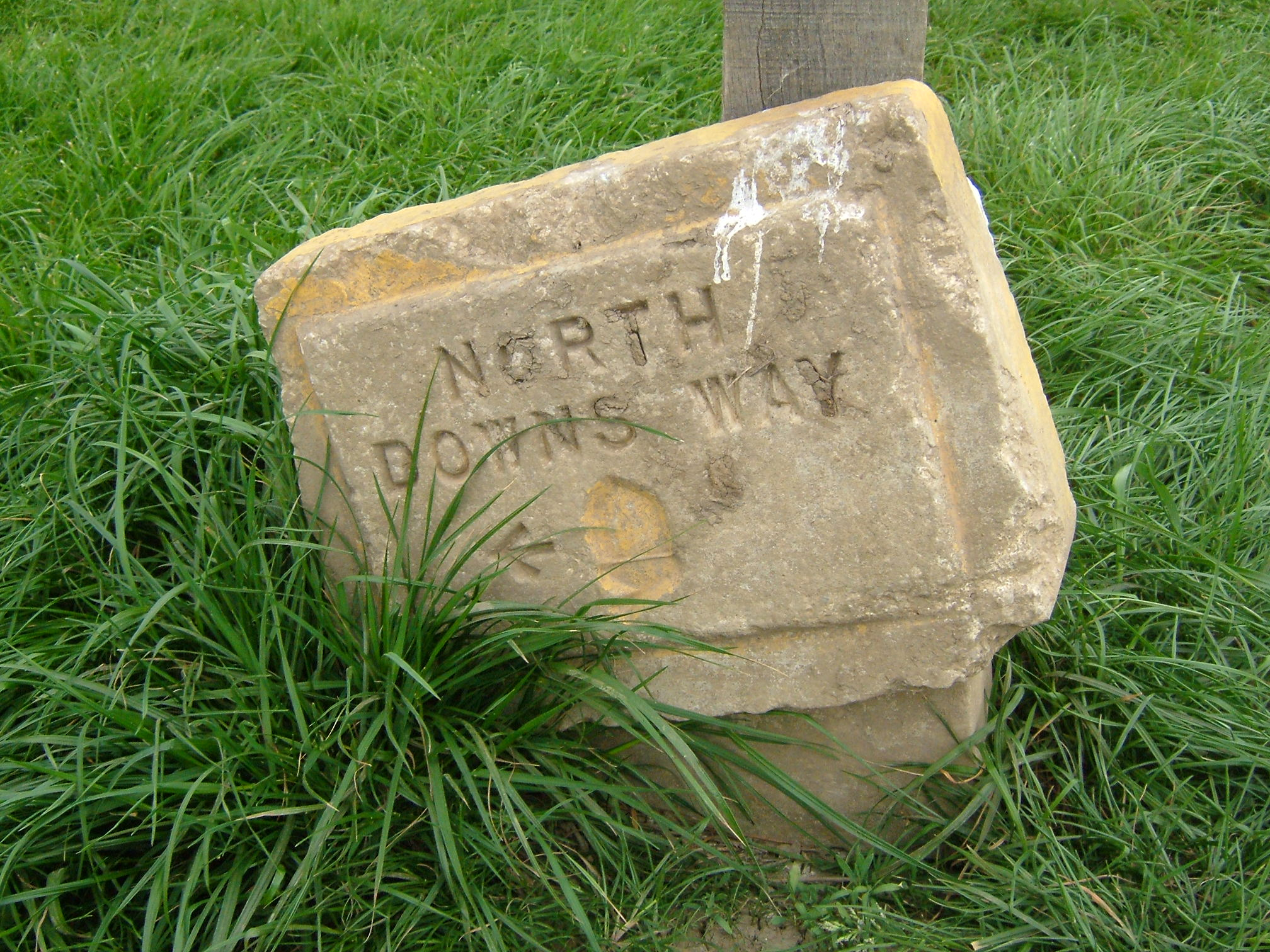
A marker on the North Downs Way, Ranscombe Farm, Cuxton, Kent

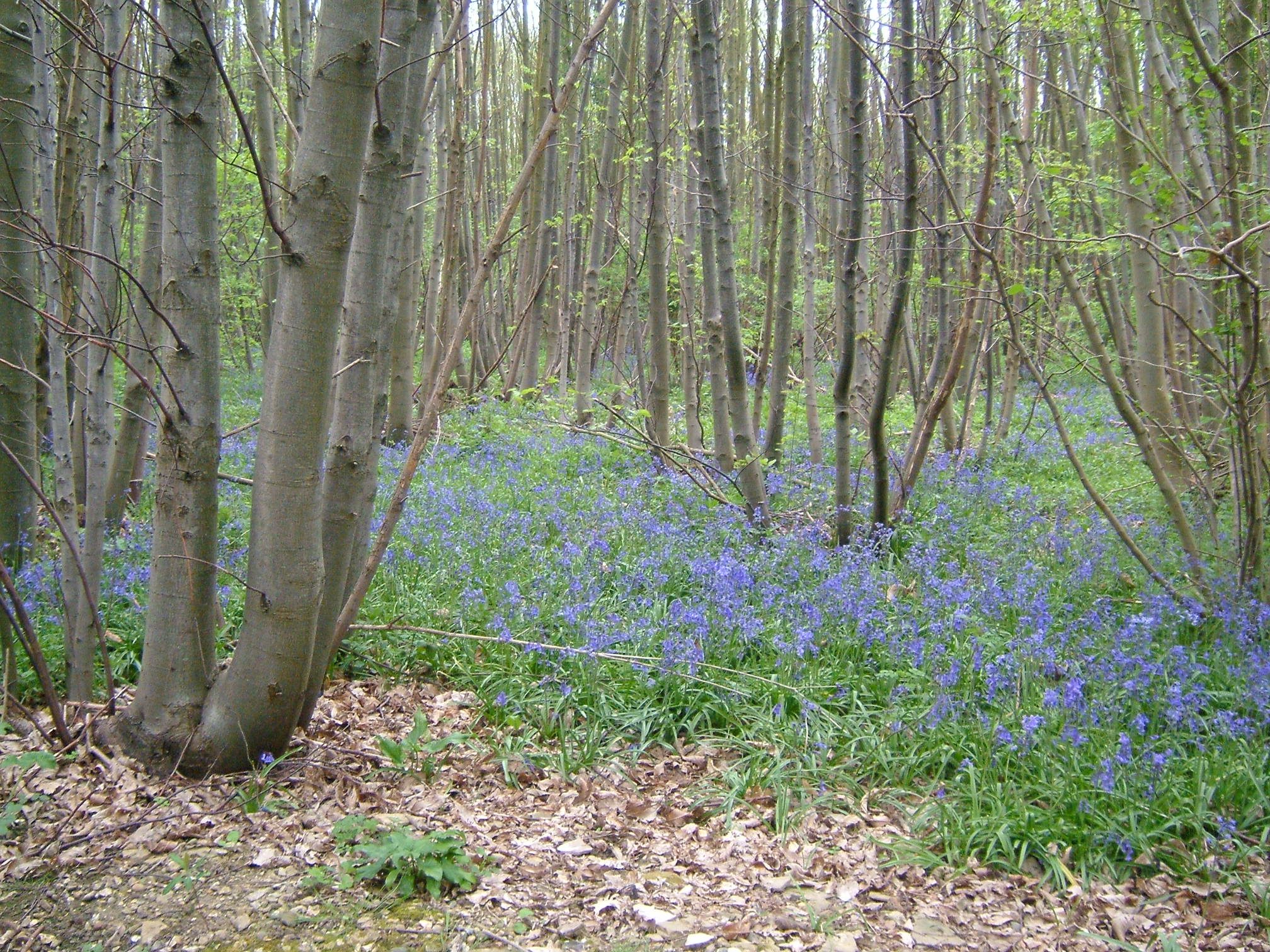
Bluebells at Ranscombe Farm

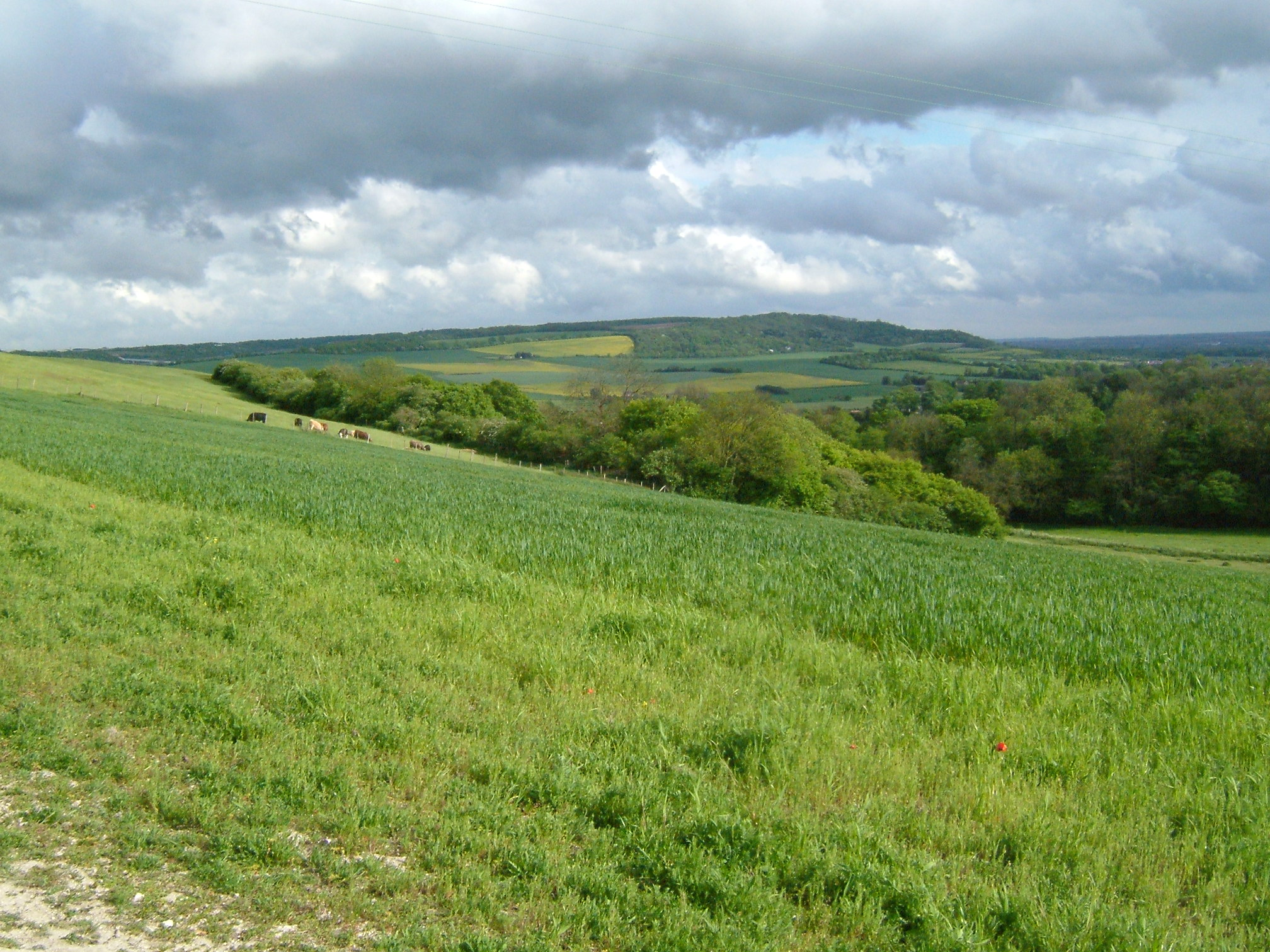
Looking East, typical downland scenery in the Medway Gap, Ranscombe Farm

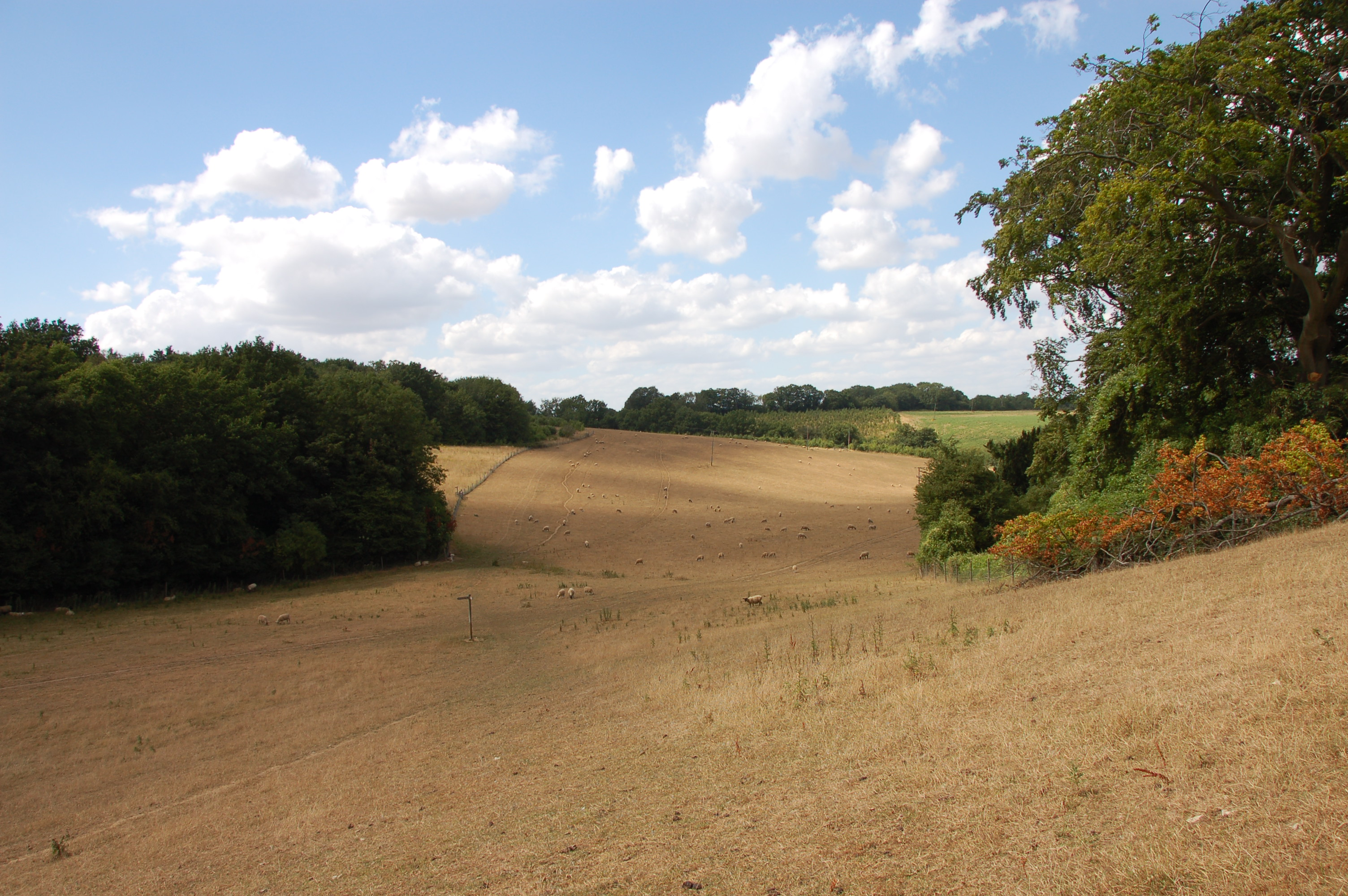
A dry valley on the dip slope of the North Downs near Hucking

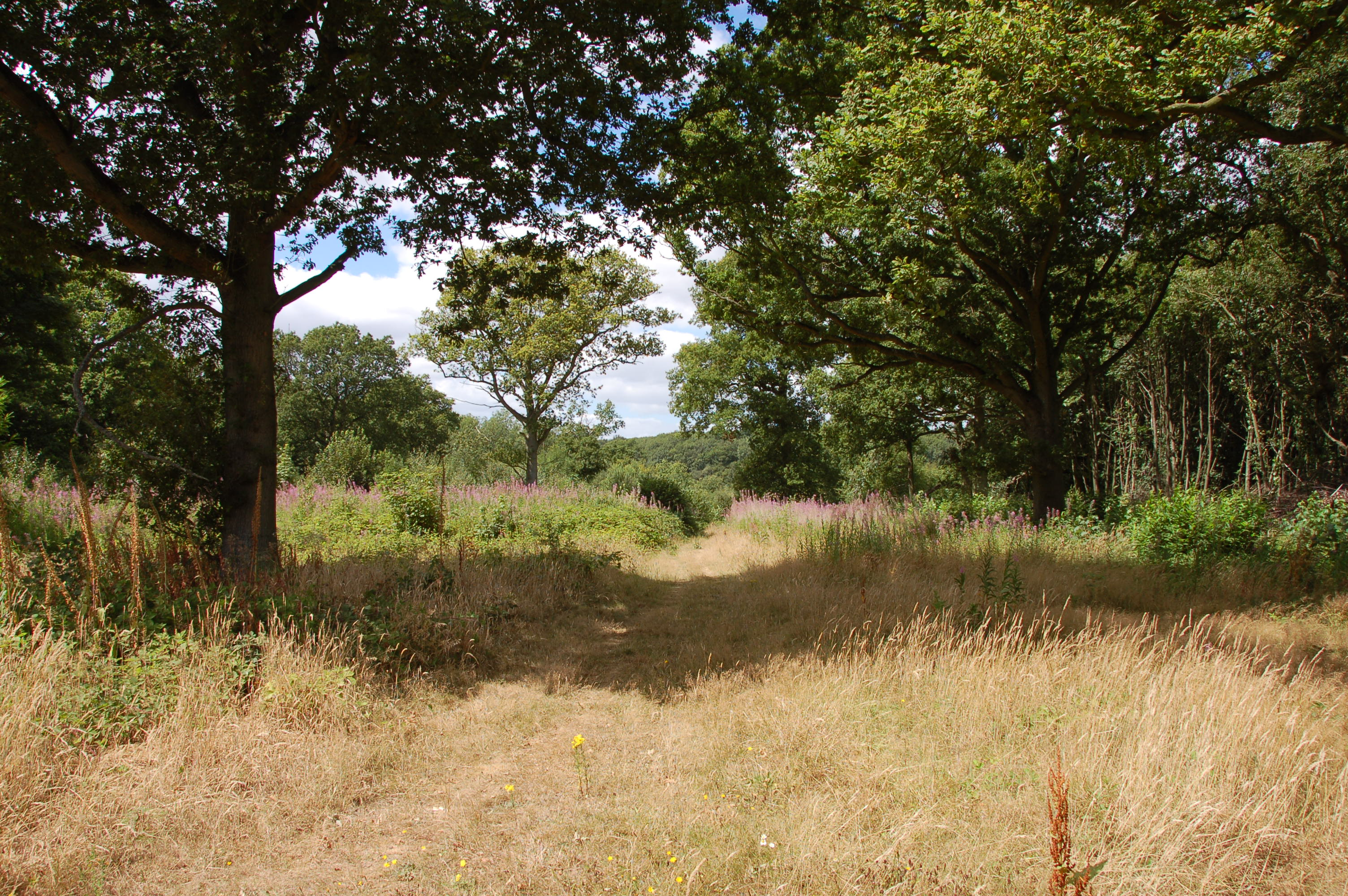
Woodland on the North Downs at the Hucking Estate

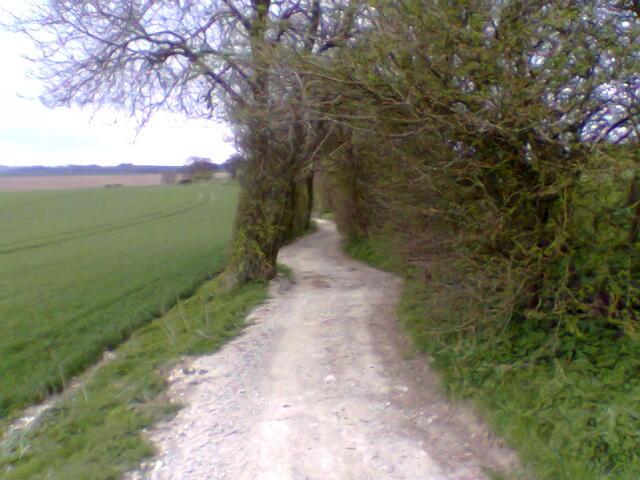
Typical chalk downland trail near Hollingbourne

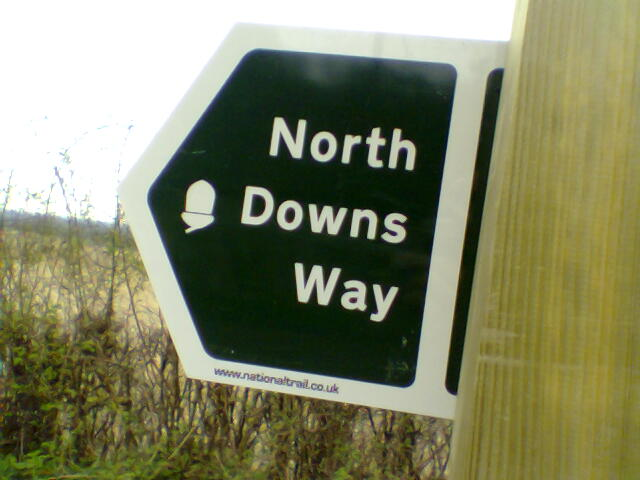
A modern metal trail marker near Harrietsham

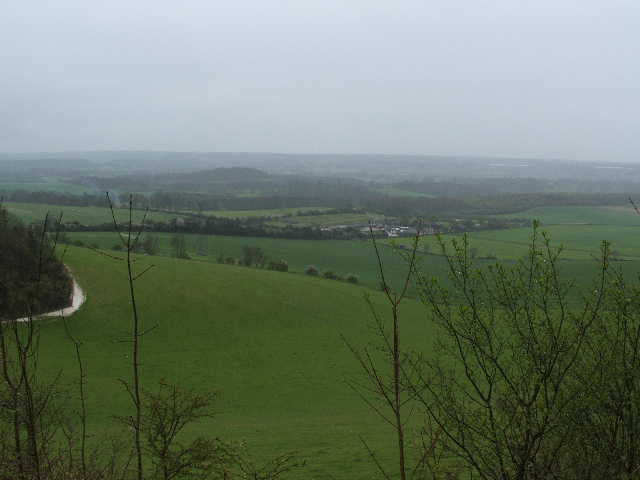
A view South across the Kent Weald from the North Downs Way near Detling

== See also ==
- Chalk figures in the United Kingdom
- Geology of the United Kingdom
- North Downs Way
- Downland

== Bibliography ==
- Bathurst, David (2012). Walking the county high points of England. Chichester: Summersdale. ISBN 978-1-84-953239-6.
- Beanse, Alec; Gill, Roger (2011). The London Mobilisation Centres. Hampshire: David Moore. ISBN 978-0954845377.
- Bennison, GM; Wright, AE (1969). The geological history of the British Isles. London: Edward Arnold.
- Brandon, Peter (2005). The North Downs. Chichester: Phillimore. ISBN 978-1860773532.
- Chapman, GM; Young, RHD (1979). Box Hill. Lyme Regis: Serendip. ISBN 0-9504143-1-X.
- Dines, HG; Edmunds, FH; Chatwin, CP; Stubblefield, CJ (1933). The geology of the country around Reigate and Dorking : Explanation of one-inch geological sheet 286, new series. London: British Geological Survey. Archived from the original on 2 January 2021.
- Tuson, Dan (2007). Kent Downs. Cheltenham: The History Press. ISBN 978-0752444055.
