= Hollingbourne Downs =

Nature reserve in Kent, England

Coordinates: 51.27°N 0.649°E

- Site of Special Scientific Interest
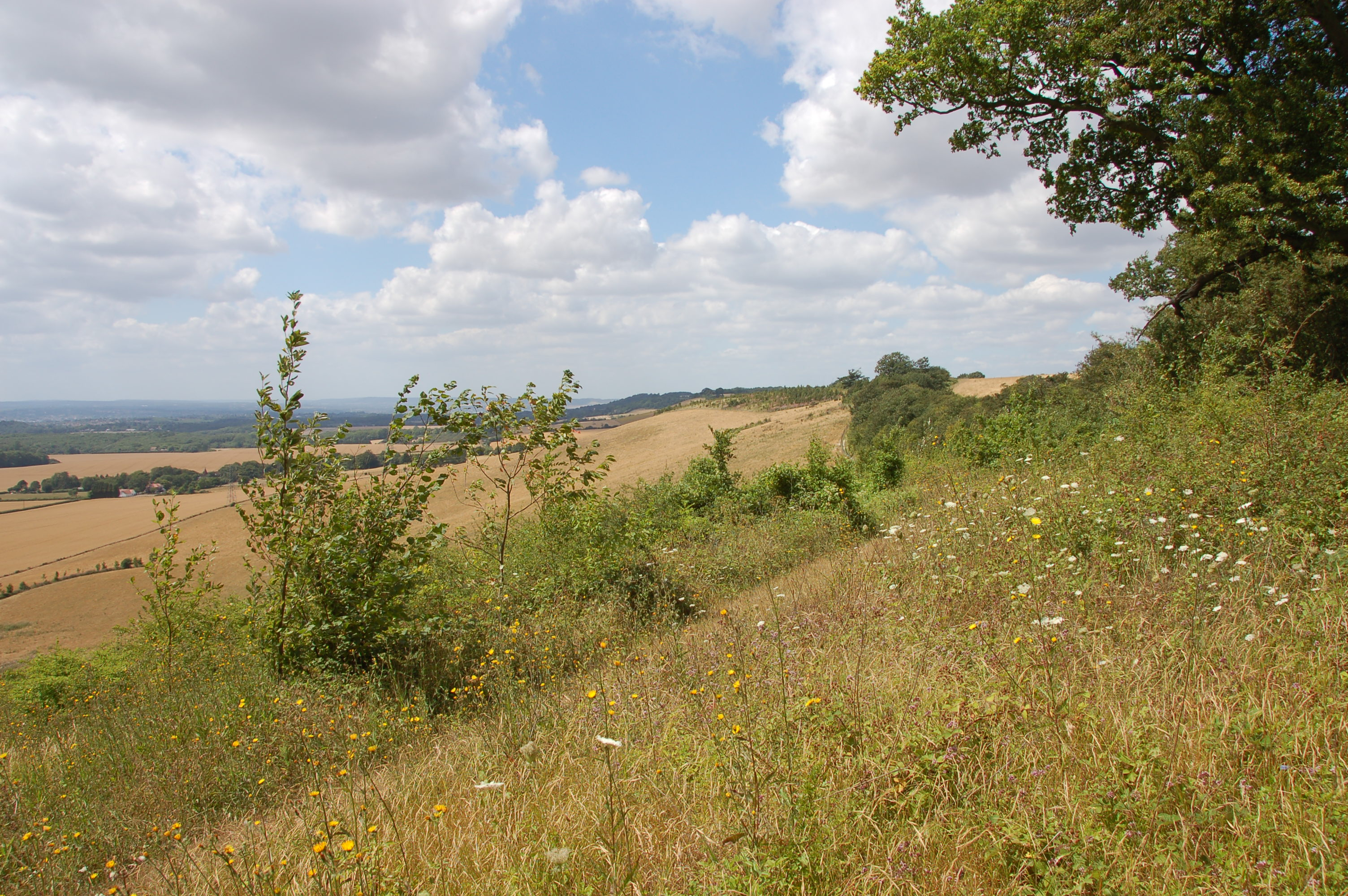
- Location of Hollingbourne Downs.
- Area of search: Kent
- Grid reference: TQ 849 557
- Interest: Biological
- Area: 60.9 hectares (150 acres)
- Notification date: 1986
- Location map: Magic Map

Hollingbourne Downs is a 60.9-hectare (150-acre) biological Site of Special Scientific Interest east of Maidstone in Kent.

This escarpment has unimproved chalk grassland and beech woodland. The dominant grasses are tor-grass, upright brome and sheep's fescue, and shrub species on woodland margins include the wayfaring-tree and traveller's-joy.

The site is crossed by several public footpaths.
