= List of Dyspnoi species =

This page lists all described species of the harvestmen suborder Dyspnoi. Unless otherwise noted, information is taken from Schönhofer's 2013 taxonomic catalogue. The inclusion of Acropsopilionidae within Dyspnoi is based on Groh & Giribet, 2014. Further amendments here should reflect the World Catalog of Opiliones

== Acropsopilionoidea ==
=== Acropsopilionidae ===
- Acropsopilio Silvestri, 1904

- Acropsopilio australicus Cantrell, 1980
- Acropsopilio boopis (Crosby, 1904)
- Acropsopilio chilensis Silvestri, 1904
- Acropsopilio chomulae (Goodnight and Goodnight, 1948)
- Acropsopilio neozealandiae (Forster, 1948)
- Acropsopilio venezuelensis González-Sponga, 1992

- Austropsopilio Forster, 1955

- Austropsopilio altus Cantrell, 1980
- Austropsopilio cygneus Hickman, 1957
- Austropsopilio fuscus (Hickman, 1957)
- Austropsopilio inermis Cantrell, 1980
- Austropsopilio megalops (Hickman, 1957)
- Austropsopilio novaehollandiae Forster, 1955
- Austropsopilio sudamericanus Shultz and Cekalovic, 2003

- Caddella Hirst, 1925

- Caddella africana (Lawrence, 1931)
- Caddella capensis Hirst, 1925
- Caddella croeseri Staręga, 1988
- Caddella haddadi Lotz, 2011
- Caddella jocquei Staręga, 2008
- Caddella spatulipis Lawrence, 1934

== Ischyropsalidoidea ==
=== Ischyropsalididae ===
==== Ceratolasmatinae ====
- Acuclavella Shear, 1986

- Acuclavella cosmetoides Shear, 1986
- Acuclavella leonardi Richart & Hedin, 2013
- Acuclavella makah Richart & Hedin, 2013
- Acuclavella merickeli Shear, 1986
- Acuclavella quattuor Shear, 1986
- Acuclavella shear Richart & Hedin, 2013
- Acuclavella shoshone Shear, 1986

- Ceratolasma Goodnight & Goodnight, 1942

- Ceratolasma tricantha Goodnight & Goodnight, 1942

==== Ischyropsalidinae ====
- Ischyropsalis C.L.Koch, 1839

- Ischyropsalis adamii Canestrini, 1873
- Ischyropsalis alpinula Martens, 1978
- Ischyropsalis cantabrica Luque & Labrada, 2012
- Ischyropsalis carli Lessert, 1905
- Ischyropsalis dentipalpis Canestrini, 1872
- Ischyropsalis dispar Simon, 1872
- Ischyropsalis gigantea Drescoe, 1968
- Ischyropsalis hadzii Roewer, 1950
- Ischyropsalis hellwigii (Panzer, 1794)

- Ischyropsalis hellwigii hellwigii (Panzer, 1794)
- Ischyropsalis hellwigii lucantei Simon, 1879

- Ischyropsalis hispanica Roewer, 1953
- Ischyropsalis kollari C.L. Koch, 1839
- Ischyropsalis lithoclasica Schönhofer & Martens, 2010
- Ischyropsalis luteipes Simon, 1872
- Ischyropsalis magdalenae Simon, 1881
- Ischyropsalis manicata C.L. Koch, 1869
- Ischyropsalis muellneri Harmann, 1898
- Ischyropsalis nodifera Simon, 1879
- Ischyropsalis petiginosa Simon, 1913
- Ischyropsalis pyrenaea Simon, 1872
- Ischyropsalis ravasinii Hadži, 1942
- Ischyropsalis robusta Simon, 1872
- Ischyropsalis strandi Kratochvíl, 1936

=== Sabaconidae ===
- Sabacon Simon, 1879

- Sabacon aigoual Martens, 2015
- Sabacon akiyoshiensis Suzuki, 1963
- Sabacon altomontanus Martens, 1983
- Sabacon astoriensis Shear, 1975
- Sabacon beatae Martens, 2015
- Sabacon beishanensis Martens, 2015
- Sabacon briggsi Shear, 1975
- Sabacon bryantii (Banks, 1898)
- Sabacon cavicolens (Packard, 1884)
- Sabacon chomolongmae Martens, 1972
- Sabacon crassipalpis (L. Koch, 1879)
- Sabacon dentipalpis Suzuki, 1949
- Sabacon dhaulagiri Martens, 1972
- Sabacon distinctus Suzuki, 1974
- Sabacon franzi Roewer, 1953
- Sabacon gonggashan Tsurusaki & Song, 1993
- Sabacon hinkukhola Martens, 2015
- Sabacon imamurai Suzuki, 1964
- Sabacon iriei Suzuki, 1974
- Sabacon ishizuchi Suzuki, 1974
- Sabacon jaegeri Martens, 2015
- Sabacon jiriensis Martens, 1972
- Sabacon kangding Martens, 2015
- Sabacon maipokhari Martens, 2015
- Sabacon makinoi Suzuki, 1949

- Sabacon makinoi makinoi Suzuki, 1949
- Sabacon makinoi sugimotoi Suzuki & Tsurusaki, 1983

- Sabacon martensi Tsurusaki & Song, 1993
- Sabacon minshanensis Martens, 2015
- Sabacon minutissimus Martens, 2015
- Sabacon mitchelli Crosby & Bishop, 1924
- Sabacon monacanthus Zhao, Martens, & Zhang, 2018
- Sabacon multiserratus Martens, 2015
- Sabacon nishikawai Martens, 2015
- Sabacon occidentalis (Banks, 1894)
- Sabacon okadai Suzuki, 1941
- Sabacon palpogranulatus Martens, 1972
- Sabacon paradoxus Simon, 1879
- Sabacon pasonianus Luque, 1991
- Sabacon pauperoserratus Martens, 2015
- Sabacon petarberoni Martens, 2015
- Sabacon picosantrum Martens, 1983
- Sabacon pygmaeus Miyosi, 1942
- Sabacon relictoides Martens, 2015
- Sabacon relictus Marten, 1972
- Sabacon rossopacificus Martens, 2015
- Sabacon rupinala Martens, 2015
- Sabacon satoikioi Miyosi, 1942
- Sabacon shawalleri Martens, 2015
- Sabacon sergeidedicatus Martens, 1989
- Sabacon sheari Cokendolpher, 1984
- Sabacon simbuakhola Martens, 2015
- Sabacon simoni Dresco, 1952
- Sabacon sineglandula Martens, 2015
- Sabacon siskiyou Shear, 1975
- Sabacon suzukii Zhao, Martens, & Zhang, 2018
- Sabacon thakkolanus Martens, 2015
- Sabacon unicornis Martens, 1972
- Sabacon viscayanus Simon, 1881

- Sabacon viscayanus ramblaianus Martens, 1983
- Sabacon viscayanus viscayanus Simon, 1881

- Sabacon zateevi Trilikauskas & Azarkina, 2021

=== Taracidae ===
- Oskoron Shear, 2016

- Oskoron brevichelis Shear, 2016
- Oskoron crawfordi Shear, 2016
- Oskoron spinosus (Banks, 1894)

- Taracus Simon, 1879

- Taracus aspenae Shear, 2018
- Taracus audisioae Shear, 2016
- Taracus birsteini Ljovuschkin, 1971
- Taracus carmanah Shear, 2016
- Taracus fluvipileus Shear, 2016
- Taracus gertschi Goodnight & Goodnight, 1942
- Taracus marchingtoni Shear & Warfel, 2016
- Taracus packardi Simon, 1879
- Taracus pallipes Banks, 1894
- Taracus silvestrii Roewer, 1929
- Taracus spesavius Shear, 2016
- Taracus taylori Shear, 2016
- Taracus timpanogos Shear, 2016
- Taracus ubicki Shear, 2016

=== Incertae sedis ===
- Crosbycus Roewer, 1914

- Crosbycus dasycnemus (Crosby, 1911)

- Hesperonemastoma Gruber, 1970

- Hesperonemastoma kepharti (Gruber & Bishop, 1924)
- Hesperonemastoma modestum (Banks, 1984)
- Hesperonemastoma packardi (Roewer, 1914)
- Hesperonemastoma pallidimaculosum (Goodnight & Goodnight, 1945)
- Hesperonemastoma smilax Shear, 2010

== Troguloidea ==
=== Dicranolasmatidae ===
- Dicranolasma (Herbst, 1799)

- Dicranolasma apuanum Marcellino, 1970
- Dicranolasma cretaeum Gruber, 1998
- Dicranolasma cristatum Thorell, 1876
- Dicranolasma giljarovi Silhavý, 1966
- Dicranolasma hirtum Loman, 1894
- Dicranolasma hoberlandti Silhavý, 1956
- Dicranolasma kurdistanum Starega, 1970
- Dicranolasma mladeni I. M. Karaman, 1990
- Dicranolasma opilionoides (L. Koch, 1867)
- Dicranolasma pauper Dahl, 1903
- Dicranolasma ponticum Gruber, 1998
- Dicranolasma ressli Gruber, 1998
- Dicranolasma scabrum (Herbst, 1799)
- Dicranolasma soerensenii Thorell, 1876
- Dicranolasma thracium Starega, 1976
- Dicranolasma verhoeffi Dahl, 1903

=== Nemastomatidae ===
==== Nemastomatinae ====
- Acromitostoma Roewer, 1951

- Acromitostoma hispanum (Roewer, 1919)
- Acromitostoma rhinoceros (Roewer, 1919)

- Burnia Prieto, 2021

- Burnia sexmucronata (Simon, 1911)
- Burnia spelaea Prieto, 2021

- Carinostoma Kratochvíl, 1958

- Carinostoma carinatum (Roewer, 1914)
- Carinostoma elegans (Sørensen, 1894)
- Carinostoma ornatum (Hadži, 1940)

- Caucnemastoma Martens, 2006

- Caucnemastoma golovatchi Martens, 2006
- Caucnemastoma martensi Snegovaya, 2011

- Centetostoma Kratochvíl, 1958

- Centetostoma centetes (Simon, 1881)
- Centetostoma juberthiei Martens, 2011
- Centetostoma scabriculum (Simon, 1879)
- Centetostoma ventalloi (Mello-Leitao, 1936)

- Giljarovia Kratochvíl, 1958

- Giljarovia crimeana Tchemeris & Kovblyuk, 2012
- Giljarovia kratochvili Snegovaya, 2011
- Giljarovia redikorzevi Charitonov, 1946
- Giljarovia rossica Kratochvíl, 1958
- Giljarovia stridula (Kratochvíl, 1958)
- Giljarovia tenebricosa (Redikortsev, 1936)
- Giljarovia thoracocornuta Martens, 2006
- Giljarovia triangula Martens, 2006
- Giljarovia trianguloides Martens, 2006
- Giljarovia turica Gruber, 1976
- Giljarovia vestita Martens, 2006

- Hadzinia Šilhavý, 1966

- Hadzinia ferrani Novak & Kozel, 2014
- Hadzinia karamani (Hadži, 1940)

- Histricostoma Kratochvíl, 1958

- Histrocostoma anatolicum (Roewer, 1962)
- Histricostoma argenteolunulatum (Canestrini, 1875)
- Histricostoma caucasicum (Redikortsev, 1936)
- Histricostoma creticum (Roewer, 1927)
- Histricostoma dentipalpe (Ausserer, 1867)
- Histricostoma drenskii Kratochvíl, 1958
- Histricostoma gruberi Snegovaya & Marusik, 2012
- Histricostoma mitovi Snegovaya & Marusik, 2012

- Mediostoma Kratochvíl, 1958

- Mediostoma armatum Martens, 2006
- Mediostoma ceratocephalum Gruber, 1976
- Mediostoma cypricum (Roewer, 1951)
- Mediostoma globuliferum (L. Koch, 1867)
- Mediostoma humerale (C.L. Koch, 1839)
- Mediostoma izmirica Snegovaya, Kurt, & Yağmur, 2016
- Mediostoma nigrum Martens, 2006
- Mediostoma pamiricum Staręga, 1986
- Mediostoma stussineri (Simon, 1885)
- Mediostoma talischense (Morin, 1937)
- Mediostoma variabile Martens, 2006
- Mediostoma vityae (Roewer, 1927)

- Mitostoma Roewer, 1951

- Mitostoma alpinum (Hadži, 1931)
- Mitostoma anophthalmum (Fage, 1946)
- Mitostoma atticum (Roewer, 1928)
- Mitostoma cancellatum (Roewer, 1917)
- Mitostoma carneluttii Hadži, 1973
- Mitostoma chrysomelas (Hermann, 1804)
- Mitostoma daccordii Tedeschi & Sciaky, 1997
- Mitostoma fabianae Tedescie & Sciaky, 1997
- Mitostoma gracile (Redikortsev, 1936)
- Mitostoma macedonicum Hadži, 1973
- Mitostoma olgae (Šilhavý, 1939)

- Mitostoma olgae decorum (Šilhavý, 1939)
- Mitostoma olgae kratochvili (Šilhavý, 1939)
- Mitostoma olgae olgae (Šilhavý, 1939)
- Mitostoma olgae zorae Hadži, 1973

- Mitostoma orobicum (Caporiacco, 1949)
- Mitostoma patrizii Roewer, 1953
- Mitostoma pyrenaeum (Simon, 1879)
- Mitostoma sabbadinii Tedeschi & Sciaky
- Mitostoma valdemonense Marcellino, 1974
- Mitostoma zmajevicae Hadži, 1973

- Nemaspela Šilhavý, 1966

- Nemaspela abchasica (Ljovuschkin & Starobogatov, 1963)
- Nemaspela birsteini Ljovuschkin, 1972
- Nemaspela borkoae Kozel, Delić & Novak, 2020
- Nemaspela caeca (Grese, 1911)
- Nemaspela femorecurvata Martens, 2006
- Nemaspela gagrica Tchemeris, 2013
- Nemaspela kovali Tchemeris, 2009
- Nemaspela ladae Karaman, 2013
- Nemaspela melouri Martens, Maghradze & Barjadze, 2021
- Nemaspela prometheusi Martens, Maghradze & Barjadze, 2021
- Nemaspela sokolovi (Ljovuschkin & Starobogatov, 1963)
- Nemaspela taurica (Lebedinski, 1914) (But see as synonym under Nemaspela caeca per some authors, e.g. Chemeris (2009).

- Nemastoma C.L. Koch, 1836

- Nemastoma bidentatum Roewer, 1914

- Nemastoma bidentatum bidentatum Roewer, 1914
- Nemastoma bidentatum gruberi Novak, Slana Novak, Kozel & Raspotnig, 2021
- Nemastoma bidentatum martensi Novak, Slana Novak & Raspotnig, 2021
- Nemastoma bidentatum schmidti Novak, Raspotnig & Slana Novak, 2021
- Nemastoma bidentatum sneznikensis Novak, Komposch, Slana Novak & Raspotnig, 2021
- Nemastoma bidentatum sparsum Gruber & Martens, 1968

- Nemastoma bimaculatum (Fabricius, 1775)
- Nemastoma daciscum Koch, 1869 [Insertae sedis per Schönhofer 2013]
- Nemastoma dentigerum Canestrini, 1873
- Nemastoma kozari Novak, Kozel, Podlesnik & Raspotnig, 2021
- Nemastoma lilliputanum (Lucas, 1846) [Insertae sedis per Schönhofer 2013]
- Nemastoma lugubre (Müller, 1776)
- Nemastoma pluridentatum (Hadži, 1973)
- Nemastoma relictum (Gruber & Martens, 1968)
- Nemastoma rude Simon, 1881 [Insertae sedis per Schönhofer 2013]
- Nemastoma schuelleri Gruber & Martens, 1968
- Nemastoma transsylvanicum Gruber & Martens, 1968
- Nemastoma triste (C.L. Koch, 1835)

- Nemastomella Mello-Leitão, 1936

- Nemastomella armatissima (Roewer, 1962)
- Nemastomella bacillifera (Simon, 1879)

- Nemastomella bacillifera bacillifera (Simon, 1879)
- Nemastomella bacillifera carbonaria (Simon, 1907)

- Nemastomella cristinae (Rambla, 1969)
- Nemastomella dentipatellae (Dresco, 1967)
- Nemastomella dipentata (Rambla, 1959)
- Nemastomella dubia (Mello-Leitão, 1936)
- Nemastomella gevia Prieto, 2004
- Nemastomella hankiewiczii (Kulczyński, 1909)
- Nemastomella iberica (Rambla in Dresco, 1967)
- Nemastomella maarebensis (Simon, 1913)
- Nemastomella manicata (Simon, 1913)
- Nemastomella monchiquensis (Kraus, 1961)
- Nemastomella spinosissima (Kraus, 1961)

- Paranemastoma Redikorzev, 1936

- Paranemastoma aeginum (Roewer, 1951) [Nomen dubium per Schönhofer 2013]
- Paranemastoma amseli (Roewer, 1951) [Nomen dubium per Schönhofer 2013]
- Paranemastoma amuelleri (Roewer, 1951) [Nomen dubium per Schönhofer 2013]
- Paranemastoma ancae Avram, 1973
- Paranemastoma armatum (Kulczyński, 1909)
- Paranemastoma aurigerum (Roewer, 1951)

- Paranemastoma aurigerum aurigerum (Roewer, 1951)
- Paranemastoma aurigerum joannae Staręga, 1976
- Paranemastoma aurigerum ryla (Roewer, 1951)

- Paranemastoma aurosum (L. Koch, 1869)
- Paranemastoma bacurianum (Mkheidze, 1959)
- Paranemastoma beroni Mitov, 2011
- Paranemastoma bicuspidatum (C.L. Koch, 1835)
- Paranemastoma bolei (Hadži, 1973) [Nomen dubium per Schönhofer 2013]
- Paranemastoma brevipalpatum (Roewer, 1951) [Nomen dubium per Schönhofer 2013]
- Paranemastoma bureschi (Roewer, 1926)
- Paranemastoma caporiaccoi (Roewer, 1951) [Nomen dubium per Schönhofer 2013]
- Paranemastoma carneluttii (Hadži, 1973) [Nomen dubium per Schönhofer 2013]
- Paranemastoma corcyraeum (Roewer, 1917)
- Paranemastoma emigratum (Roewer, 1959) [Nomen dubium per Schönhofer 2013]
- Paranemastoma ferkeri (Roewer, 1951) [Nomen dubium per Schönhofer 2013]
- Paranemastoma filipes (Roewer, 1917)
- Paranemastoma gostivarense (Hadži, 1973) [Nomen dubium per Schönhofer 2013]
- Paranemastoma ikarium (Roewer, 1951) [Nomen dubium per Schönhofer 2013]
- Paranemastoma ios (Roewer, 1917) [Nomen dubium per Schönhofer 2013]
- Paranemastoma iranicum Martens, 2006
- Paranemastoma kaestneri (Roewer, 1951) [Nomen dubium per Schönhofer 2013]
- Paranemastoma kalischevskyi (Roewer, 1951)
- Paranemastoma karolianum Çorak Öcal, Bayram, Yiğit & Sancak, 2017
- Paranemastoma kochii (Nowicki, 1870)
- Paranemastoma longipalpatum (Roewer, 1951) [Nomen dubium per Schönhofer 2013]
- Paranemastoma longipes (Schenkel, 1947)
- Paranemastoma macedonicum (Hadži, 1973) [Nomen dubium per Schönhofer 2013]
- Paranemastoma machadoi (Roewer, 1951) [Nomen dubium per Schönhofer 2013]
- Paranemastoma mackenseni (Roewer, 1923) [Nomen dubium per Schönhofer 2013]
- Paranemastoma montenigrinum (Nosek, 1904) [Nomen dubium per Schönhofer 2013]
- Paranemastoma monticola (Babalean, 2011)
- Paranemastoma multisignatum (Hadži, 1973) [Nomen dubium per Schönhofer 2013]
- Paranemastoma nigrum (Hadži, 1973) [Nomen dubium per Schönhofer 2013]
- Paranemastoma perfugium (Roewer, 1951) [Nomen dubium per Schönhofer 2013]
- Paranemastoma quadripunctatum (Perty, 1833)
- Paranemastoma radewi (Roewer, 1926)
- Paranemastoma redikorzevi (Roewer, 1951) [Nomen dubium per Schönhofer 2013]
- Paranemastoma santorinum (Roewer, 1951) [Nomen dubium per Schönhofer 2013]
- Paranemastoma senussium (Roewer, 1951) [Nomen dubium per Schönhofer 2013]
- Paranemastoma sillii (Herman, 1871)
- Paranemastoma simplex (Giltay, 1932)
- Paranemastoma sketi (Hadži, 1973) [Nomen dubium per Schönhofer 2013]
- Paranemastoma spinosulum (Koch, 1869) [Nomen dubium per Schönhofer 2013]
- Paranemastoma superbum Redikorzev, 1936
- Paranemastoma thessalum (Simon, 1885)
- Paranemastoma titaniacum (Roewer, 1914)
- Paranemastoma umbo (Roewer, 1951) [Nomen dubium per Schönhofer 2013]
- Paranemastoma werneri (Kulczyński, 1903)

- Pyza Staręga, 1976

- Pyza anatolica (Roewer, 1959)
- Pyza bosnica (Roewer, 1919)
- Pyza navarrense (Roewer, 1951)
- Pyza taurica Gruber, 1979

- Saccarella Schönhofer & Martens, 2012

- Saccarella schilleri Schönhofer & Martens, 2012

- Sinostoma Martens, 2016

- Sinostoma yunnanicum Martens, 2016

- Starengovia Snegovaya, 2010

- Starengovia ivanloebli Martens, 2017
- Starengovia kirgizica Snegovaya, 2010
- Starengovia quadrituberculata Zhang & Martens, 2018

- Vestiferum Martens, 2006

- Vestiferum alatum Martens, 2006
- Vestiferum funebre (Redikorzev, 1936)

==== Ortholasmatinae ====
- Asiolasma Martens, 2019

- Asiolasma ailaoshan (Zhang, Zhao & Zhang, 2018)
- Asiolasma angka (Schwendinger & Gruber, 1992) (Transfer in)
- Asiolasma billsheari Martens, 2019
- Asiolasma damingshan (Zhang & Zhang, 2013)
- Asiolasma juergengruberi Martens, 2019
- Asiolasma schwendingeri Martens, 2019

- Cladolasma Suzuki, 1963

- Cladolasma parvulum Suzuki, 1963

- Cryptolasma Cruz-López, Cruz-Bonilla & Francke, 2018

- Cryptolasma aberrante Cruz-López, Cruz-Bonilla & Francke, 2018
- Cryptolasma citlaltepetl Cruz-López, Cruz-Bonilla & Francke, 2018

- Dendrolasma Banks, 1894

- Dendrolasma dentipalpe Shear & Gruber, 1983
- Dendrolasma mirabile Banks, 1894

- Martensolasma Shear, 2006

- Martensolasma catrina Cruz-López, 2017
- Martensolasma jocheni Shear, 2006

- Ortholasma Banks, 1894

- Ortholasma colossus Shear, 2010
- Ortholasma coronadense Cockerell, 1916
- Ortholasma levipes Shear & Gruber, 1983
- Ortholasma pictipes Banks, 1911
- Ortholasma rugosum Banks, 1894

- Trilasma Goodnight & Goodnight, 1942

- Trilasma bolivari Goodnight & Goodnight, 1942
- Trilasma chipinquense Shear, 2010 (Note: The species name was defined as an adjective in the original description with spelling as Trilasma chipinquensis, but in accordance with a neuter genus its suffix is subsequently altered for gender agreement.)
- Trilasma hidalgo Shear, 2010
- Trilasma petersprousei Shear, 2010
- Trilasma ranchonuevo Shear, 2010
- Trilasma sbordonii (Šilhavý, 1973)
- Trilasma tempestado Shear, 2010
- Trilasma trispinosum Shear, 2010
- Trilasma tropicum Shear, 2010

=== Nipponopsalididae ===
- Nipponopsalis (Sato & Suzuki, 1939)

- Nipponopsalis abei (Sato & Suzuki, 1939)

- Nipponopsalis abei abei (Sato & Suzuki, 1939)
- Nipponopsalis abei longipes Suzuki, 1973

- Nipponopsalis coreana (Suzuki, 1966)
- Nipponopsalis yezoensis (Suzuki, 1958)

=== Trogulidae ===
- Anarthrotarsus Silhavý, 1967

- Anarthrotarsus martensi Silhavý, 1967
- Anarthrotarsus trichasi Kontos & Martens, 2022

- Anelasmocephalus Simon, 1879

- Anelasmocephalus balearicus Martens & Chemini, 1988
- Anelasmocephalus brignolii Martens & Chemini, 1988
- Anelasmocephalus calcaneatus Martens & Chemini, 1988
- Anelasmocephalus cambridgei (Westwood, 1874)
- Anelasmocephalus cazorla Prieto & Las Heras, 2020
- Anelasmocephalus crassipes (H. Lucas, 1846)
- Anelasmocephalus gadirrif Prieto & Las Heras, 2020
- Anelasmocephalus hadzii Martens, 1978
- Anelasmocephalus lycosinus (Sørensen, 1873)
- Anelasmocephalus ortunioi Prieto & Las Heras, 2020
- Anelasmocephalus osellai Martens & Chemini, 1988
- Anelasmocephalus pusillus Simon, 1879
- Anelasmocephalus pyrenaicus Martens, 1978
- Anelasmocephalus rufitarsis Simon, 1879
- Anelasmocephalus tenuiglandis Martens & Chemini, 1988
- Anelasmocephalus tuscus Martens & Chemini, 1988

- Calathocratus Simon, 1879

- Calathocratus africanus (H. Lucas, 1846)
- Calathocratus beieri Gruber, 1968
- Calathocratus caucasicus (Šilhavý, 1966)
- Calathocratus hirsutus Snegovaya, 2011
- Calathocratus intermedius Roewer, 1940
- Calathocratus kyrghyzicus (Tchemeris, 2013)
- Calathocratus minutus Snegovaya, 2011
- Calathocratus rhodiensis (Gruber, 1963)
- Calathocratus singularis (Roewer, 1940)
- Calathocratus sinuosus (Sørensen, 1873)

- Kofiniotis Roewer, 1940

- Kofiniotis creticus Roewer, 1940

- Trogulus Latreille, 1802

- Trogulus aquaticus Simon, 1879
- Trogulus balearicus Schönhofer & Martens, 2008
- Trogulus banaticus Avram, 1971
- Trogulus cisalpinus Chemini & Martens, 1988
- Trogulus closanicus Avram, 1971
- Trogulus coreiformis C. L. Koch, in Hahn & Koch, 1839) [Nomen dubium per Schönhofer 2013]
- Trogulus coriziformis C. L. Koch, in Hahn & Koch, 1839
- Trogulus cristatus Simon, 1879
- Trogulus falcipenis Komposch, 1999
- Trogulus graecus Dahl, 1903
- Trogulus gypseus Simon, 1879
- Trogulus hirtus Dahl, 1903
- Trogulus huberi Schönhofer & Martens, 2008
- Trogulus karamanorum Schönhofer & Martens, 2009
- Trogulus lusitanicus Giltay, 1932
- Trogulus lygaeiformis C. L. Koch, in Hahn & Koch, 1839
- Trogulus martensi Chemini, 1983
- Trogulus megaligrava Schönhofer et al., 2013
- Trogulus melitensis Schönhofer & Martens, 2009
- Trogulus nepaeformis (Scopoli, 1763)
- Trogulus oltenicus Avram, 1971
- Trogulus ozimeci Schönhofer et al., 2013
- Trogulus pharensis Schönhofer & Martens, 2009
- Trogulus prietoi Schönhofer & Martens, 2008
- Trogulus pulverulentus C. L. Koch, 1856 [Nomen dubium per Schönhofer 2013]
- Trogulus pyrenaicus Schönhofer & Martens, 2008
- Trogulus rossicus Šilhavý, 1968
- Trogulus setosissimus Roewer, 1940
- Trogulus squamatus C. L. Koch, in Hahn & Koch, 1839
- Trogulus templetonii Westwood, 1833 [Nomen dubium per Schönhofer 2013]
- Trogulus tenuitarsus Schönhofer et al., 2013
- Trogulus thaleri Schönhofer & Martens, 2009
- Trogulus tingiformis C. L. Koch, in Hahn & Koch, 1839
- Trogulus torosus Simon, 1885
- Trogulus tricarinatus (Linnaeus, 1767)
- Trogulus uncinatus Gruber, 1973

- †Trogulus longipes Haupt, 1956 (fossil: Eocene)
