= Martensolasma =

Scientific classification
- Domain: Eukaryota
- Kingdom: Animalia
- Phylum: Arthropoda
- Subphylum: Chelicerata
- Class: Arachnida
- Order: Opiliones
- Family: Nemastomatidae
- Subfamily: Ortholasmatinae
- Genus: Martensolasma; William Shear, 2006

Type species
- Martensolasma jocheni William Shear, 2006

Diversity
- 2 species

Genus of harvestmen/daddy longlegs

Martensolasma is a genus of harvestmen in the family Nemastomatidae with two described species (as of 2023). Both species are found in Mexico. The type species was include in catalog by Schönhofer (2013). The genus Martensolasma was described by William Shear, with the type species Martensolasma jocheni Shear, 2006. A second species was later added to the genus by Cruz-López, 2017.

== Description ==
The genus Martensolasma was originally said to be distinct from Ortholasma and Dendrolasma by lacking a hood projecting over the chelicerae, and in exhibiting complete scutum magnum. The femora of the legs have few or no pseudoarticulations. In the males, the penial setation is monomorphic, consisting of few very small, acute setae. Additionally the male chelicerae has a tooth-like projections on proximal and median articles and pedipalpi haveh epigamic glands in patellae and tibiae. (Adapted from Shear, 2006) Later, M. catrina was differentiated from M. jocheni by the combination of characters from the scutal ornamentation, basal segment of chelicera, metatarsus II, tarsus II & the penial stylus. (Adapted from Cruz-López, 2017)

== Species ==
These two species belong to the genus Martensolasma:

- Martensolasma catrina Cruz-López, 2017 – Mexico (Hidalgo)
- Martensolasma jocheni Shear, 2006 – Mexico

== Etymology ==
The genus is neuter.
