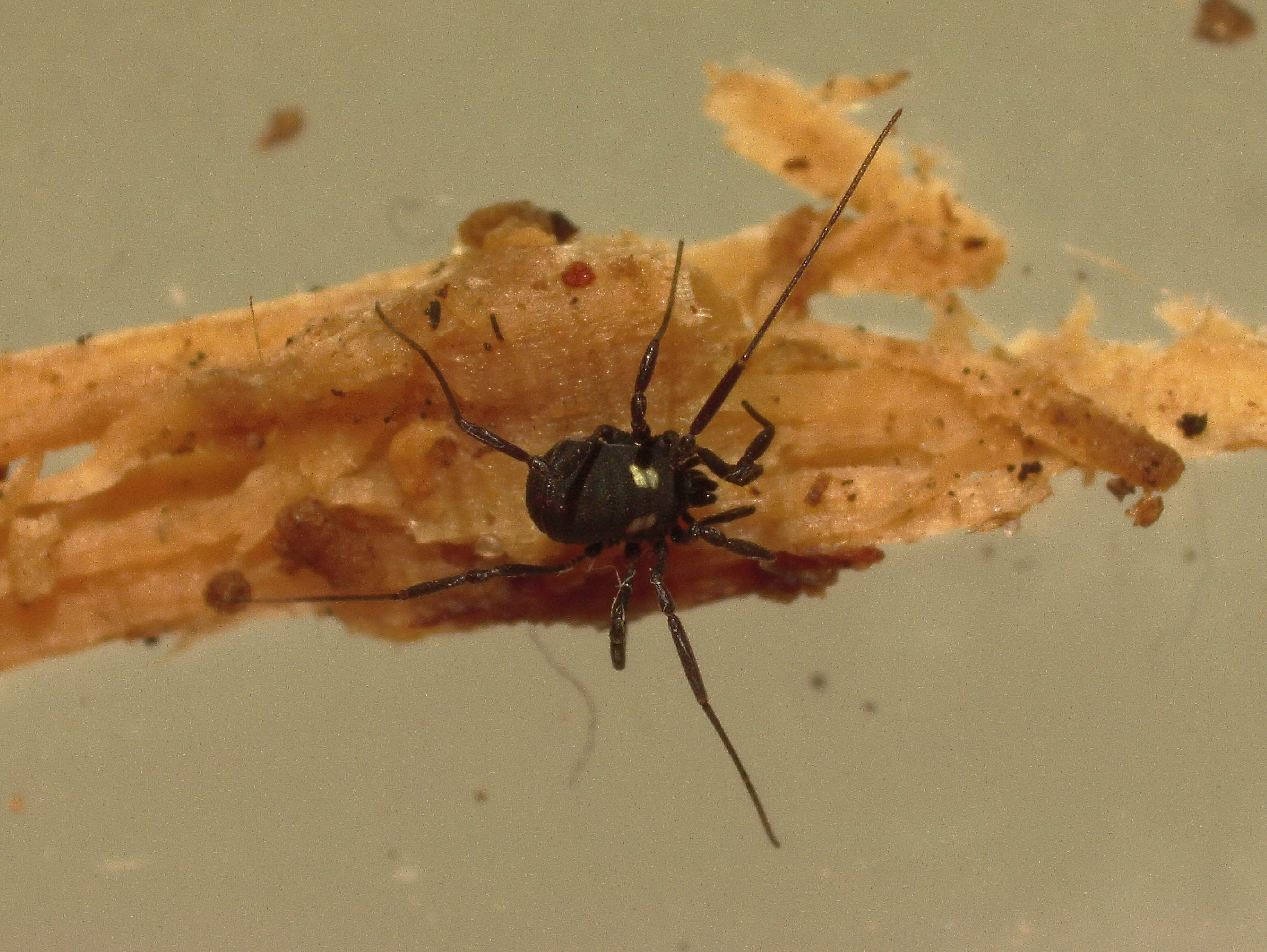
- Nemastoma lugubre

Scientific classification
- Kingdom: Animalia
- Phylum: Arthropoda
- Subphylum: Chelicerata
- Class: Arachnida
- Order: Opiliones
- Family: Nemastomatidae
- Subfamily: Nemastomatinae; Simon, 1872

Genera
- World Catalog of Opiliones: † Paragiljarovia; † Parahistricostoma; Acromitostoma; Burnia; Carinostoma; Caucnemastoma; Centetostoma; Giljarovia; Hadzinia; Histricostoma; Mediostoma; Mitostoma; Nemaspela; Nemastoma; Nemastomella; Paranemastoma; Pyza; Saccarella; Sinostoma; Starengovia; Vestiferum

Diversity
- 19 genera, 125+ species

= Nemastomatinae =

Subfamily of harvestmen/daddy longlegs

Nemastomatinae is a subfamily of harvestmen with over 125 described species in 19 (extant) genera. They are usually found in temperate regions.

== Species ==
For complete breakdown, see Nemastomatidae, or:

The genera are as follows (as of 2023):

- Acromitostoma Roewer, 1951 (2 species) – Spain, Morocco
- Burnia Prieto, 2021 (2 species) – Spain
- Carinostoma Kratochvíl, 1958 (2 species) – Southern Europe
- Caucnemastoma Martens, 2006 (2 species) - Russia
- Centetostoma Kratochvíl, 1958 (2 species) – Western Europe
- Giljarovia Kratochvíl, 1958 (11 species) – Eastern Europe, Russia, etc. (See Tchemeris & Kovblyuk, 2012)
- Hadzinia Šilhavý, 1966 (See Novak & Kozel, 2014) (2 species) – European Balkans
- Histricostoma Kratochvíl, 1958 (8 species) – Southern Europe
- Mediostoma Kratochvíl, 1958 – Southeastern Europe, Anatolia, Central Asia
- Mitostoma Roewer, 1951 – Europe (widespread), Caucasus
- Nemaspela Šilhavý, 1966 – Caucasus, Southeastern Europe
- Nemastoma C.L. Koch, 1836 – Europe (Widespread), Algeria (?)
- Nemastomella Mello-Leitão, 1936 – Western Europe, Algeria (?)
- Paranemastoma Redikorzev, 1936 – Europe (Widespread), Caucasus, Anatolia, (plus India?)
- Pyza Staręga, 1976 – Southeastern Europe, Anatolia
- Saccarella Schönhofer & Martens, 2012 – Italy
- Sinostoma Martens, 2016 – China
- Starengovia Snegovaya, 2010 – Central Asia, China
- Vestiferum Martens, 2006 – Caucasus, Anatolia

== Fossil species ==
There are currently 5 described fossil harvestmen that have been assigned to Nemastomatinae, 4 of which are assigned to modern genera:

- Histricostoma Kratochvíl, 1958

- † Histricostoma tuberculatum (C.L. Koch & Berendt, 1854) - Paleogene Baltic & Bitterfield amber

- Mitostoma Roewer, 1951

- † Mitostoma denticulatum (C.L. Koch & Berendt, 1854) - Paleogene Baltic amber
- † Mitostoma gruberi Dunlop & Mitov, 2009 - Paleogene Baltic & Bitterfield amber

- Nemastoma (C.L. Koch, 1836)

- † Nemastoma incertum C.L. Koch & Berendt, 1854 - Paleogene Baltic amber

- † Paragilarovia Elsaka, Mitov, & Dunlop, 2019

- † Paragilarovia hochae Elsaka, Mitov, & Dunlop, 2019 - Paleogene Baltic amber
