= Asiolasma damingshan =

Scientific classification
- Domain: Eukaryota
- Kingdom: Animalia
- Phylum: Arthropoda
- Subphylum: Chelicerata
- Class: Arachnida
- Order: Opiliones
- Family: Nemastomatidae
- Genus: Asiolasma
- Species: A. damingshan

Binomial name
- Asiolasma damingshan (Zhang & Zhang, 2013)

Synonyms
- Synonymy: Cladolasma damingshan Zhang & Zhang, 2013

Species of harvestman/daddy longlegs

Asiolasma damingshan, is a species of harvestman belonging to the family Nemastomatidae. It is endemic to Guangxi Autonomous Region. China. It was initially described in the genus Cladolasma before being redefined within Asiolasma when that genus was newly described.

== Description ==
Asiolasma damingshan is notable for the absence of keels around the eyes and arrangement of large spines on the penial glans in males. It relatively small species with slightly globular body; with a prolonged central anterior part of prosoma including ocular tubercle and hood markedly elevated, and eyes situated beyond the prosomal anterior margin. The central and two distal pairs of tubercles of the hood are longest and slender. Pedipalps relatively slender with tibia shorter than in the geographically closest species, A. schwendingeri.
