= Trilasma =

Scientific classification
- Domain: Eukaryota
- Kingdom: Animalia
- Phylum: Arthropoda
- Subphylum: Chelicerata
- Class: Arachnida
- Order: Opiliones
- Family: Nemastomatidae
- Subfamily: Ortholasmatinae
- Genus: Trilasma; Goodnight & Goodnight, 1942

Type species
- Trilasma bolivari Goodnight & Goodnight, 1942

Diversity
- 9 species

Synonyms
- List: Ruaxphilos Goodnight & Goodnight 1945

Genus of harvestmen/daddy longlegs

Trilasma is a genus of harvestmen in the family Nemastomatidae with nine described species (as of 2023). The species are mainly found in Mexico.

The genus Trilasma was described by Goodnight & Goodnight, 1942, with the type species Trilasma bolivari Goodnight & Goodnight, 1942. Shear and Gruber, 1983 considered Trilasma as a subgenus of Ortholasma. They revised numerous samples of most species of several Ortholasmatinae in a broad revision, except the troglobiont Ortholasma sbordonii Šilhavý, 1974 which was redescribed from just the original type material. However, this and several other species were later transferred to Trilasma by William Shear. The same revised list of species were include in catalog by Schönhofer (2013).

== Description ==
The genus Trilasma was revised as a subgenus of Ortholasma by Shear and Gruber, 1983. However, it was then again diagnosed as distinct from Ortholasma by several aspects, such as the median hood arising dorsally with an anterior projection in a shallow curve. The hood is also parallel-sided or nearly so, with a dorsal tubercles in a row or rows (See Shear, 2010).

== Species ==
These nine species belong to the genus Trilasma:

- Trilasma bolivari Goodnight & Goodnight, 1942 – Mexico (Puebla)
- Trilasma chipinquense Shear, 2010 – Mexico (Nuevo León)
- Trilasma hidalgo Shear, 2010 – Mexico (Hidalgo)
- Trilasma petersprousei Shear, 2010 – Mexico (San Luis Potosí)
- Trilasma ranchonuevo Shear, 2010 – Mexico (Tamaulipas)
- Trilasma sbordonii (Šilhavý, 1973) – Mexico (Tamaulipas)
- Trilasma tempestado Shear, 2010 – Mexico (Nuevo León)
- Trilasma trispinosum Shear, 2010 – Mexico (Veracruz)
- Trilasma tropicum Shear, 2010 – Honduras [Unsure locality]

== Etymology ==
The genus is neuter.
