= Nemastoma =

Nemastoma may refer to:

- Nemastoma (harvestman), a genus of harvestmen in the family Nemastomatidae
- Nemastoma (alga), a genus of red algae in the family Nemastomataceae
