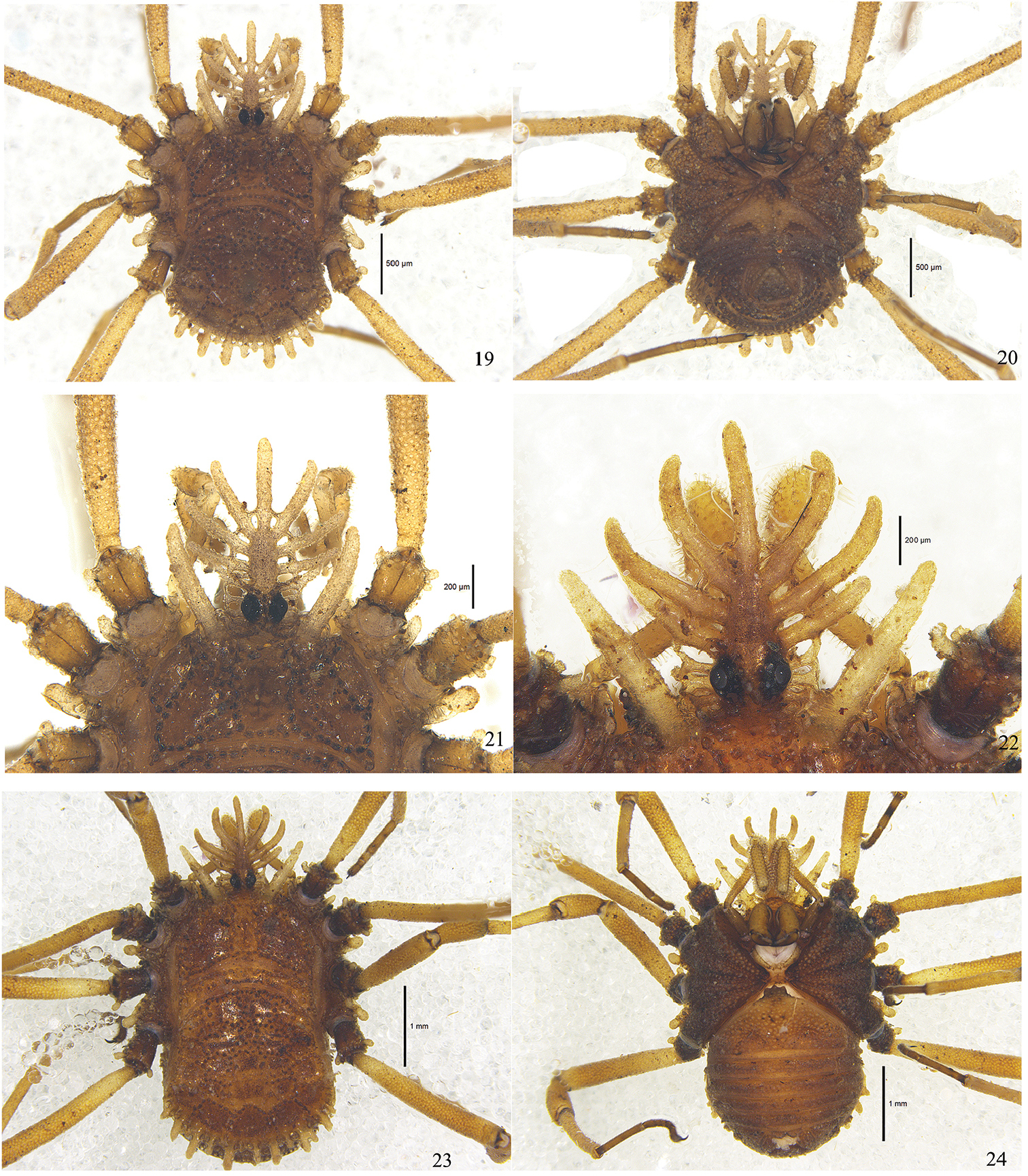

Scientific classification
- Domain: Eukaryota
- Kingdom: Animalia
- Phylum: Arthropoda
- Subphylum: Chelicerata
- Class: Arachnida
- Order: Opiliones
- Family: Nemastomatidae
- Genus: Asiolasma
- Species: A. ailaoshan

Binomial name
- Asiolasma ailaoshan (Zhang, Zhao & Zhang, 2018)

Synonyms
- Synonymy: Cladolasma ailaoshan Zhang, Zhao & Zhang, 2018

= Asiolasma ailaoshan =

Species of harvestman/daddy longlegs

Asiolasma ailaoshan is a species of harvestman belonging to the family Nemastomatidae. It is endemic to Yunnan Province, China. It was initially described in the genus Cladolasma before being redefined within Asiolasma when that genus was newly described.

== Description ==
Asiolasma ailaoshan is sexually dimorphic. The female is much larger than male: total length including hood and posterior tubercles is 4.6 millimetres (0.18 in) in the female paratype and 2.8 millimetres (0.11 in) in the male holotype. Coloration of both sexes is similar. Entire body strongly sclerotized. Surface is covered with a network of interconnected anvil-shaped tubercles. Arched hood elevated above dorsal surface. Coxae with dense wart-bearing setae on venter. Fingers of chelicerae short. Penis of male is slender and lanceolate. Ovipositor of the female is short and unsegmented. Otherwise, the apophysis of the male 2nd cheliceral article is less high, more flat, its pointed thorn is directed more downwards and runs parallel to the front side of the article; the proximal pair of spicules of the glans penis is slightly closer to the mid-group spicules than for A. juergengruberi.

== Etymology ==
The specific name ailaoshan is due to type locality of the species, Ailaoshan National Natural Reserve.
