= Asiolasma angka =

Scientific classification
- Domain: Eukaryota
- Kingdom: Animalia
- Phylum: Arthropoda
- Subphylum: Chelicerata
- Class: Arachnida
- Order: Opiliones
- Family: Nemastomatidae
- Genus: Asiolasma
- Species: A. angka

Binomial name
- Asiolasma angka (Schwendinger & Gruber, 1992)

Synonyms
- Synonymy: Dendrolasma angka Schwendinger & Gruber, 1992; Cladolasma angka (Schwendinger & Gruber, 1992)

Species of harvestman/daddy longlegs

Asiolasma angka is a species of harvestmen belonging to the family Nemastomatidae. It is found in Chiang Mai, Thailand. It was initially described in the genus Dendrolasma before being transferred in genus Cladolasma, then later redefined within Asiolasma when that genus was newly described.

== Description ==
Asiolasma angka is a comparatively small species with distinctly globular body; anterior part of prosoma distinctly prolonged, eye mound and projecting hood markedly elevated, rear part of eye mound and hood forming approximately a right angle with prosoma, eyes situated close to anterior margin of prosoma (in lateral view); opisthosoma dorsally with groups of acute processes or smooth cones on areas II-IV. The male has the truncus penis straight, parallel-sided, slightly depressed, spicules on glans uniform and symmetrically arranged; male pedipalpal patella with marked proventral brush of small setae.
