= Asiolasma billsheari =

Scientific classification
- Kingdom: Animalia
- Phylum: Arthropoda
- Subphylum: Chelicerata
- Class: Arachnida
- Order: Opiliones
- Family: Nemastomatidae
- Genus: Asiolasma
- Species: A. billsheari

Binomial name
- Asiolasma billsheari Martens, 2019

Species of harvestman/daddy longlegs

Asiolasma billsheari is a species of harvestmen belonging to the family Nemastomatidae. It is found in China, Gansu Province. It was described in the genus Asiolasma.

== Description ==
Asiolasma billsheari is a relatively small species with rather flat body and short hood. Notably, only the prolonged anterior region of the prosoma and hood slightly are elevated, as in the geographically close species A. juergengruberi. The body is less massive than in 'A. schwendingeri, due especially to the smaller hood processes. The pedipalpal patella has a bent and pointed apophysis medio-distally. Additionally, I-IV areas of opisthosoma each has a para-median pair of low tubercles.
