= Nemaspela ladae =

Scientific classification
- Kingdom: Animalia
- Phylum: Arthropoda
- Subphylum: Chelicerata
- Class: Arachnida
- Order: Opiliones
- Family: Nemastomatidae
- Genus: Nemaspela
- Species: N. ladae

Binomial name
- Nemaspela ladae Karaman, 2013

Species of arachnid

Nemaspela ladae is a species of cave-dwelling arachnid in the harvestman family Nemastomatidae.

== Description ==
This is a small, blind harvestman with a light-brown body. It is characterized by extremely long chelicerae (approximately 3 mm). The body length is about 2 mm, the pedipalps are about 7 mm long, and the legs are about 20 mm long. The species was first described in 2013 and was named in honor of the Bosnian biospeleologist Dr. Lada Lukić-Bilela from the Faculty of Sciences in Sarajevo, the president of the Biospeleological Society of Bosnia and Herzegovina, who personally discovered the first type specimens during an expedition in 2008.

== Systematics ==
This new species has been provisionally placed in the Caucasian-Crimean genus Nemaspela, due to similarities in certain morphological features. However, it also shares some characteristics with the Balkan troglobiont genus Hadzinia Šilhavý, 1966, which is also closely related to the species Nemaspela femorecurvata Martens, 2006. Together, they form a complex that also includes the fossil species Mitostoma gruberi Dunlop & Mitov, 2009, known from Bitterfeld and Baltic amber.

== Distribution ==
It is endemic to Bosnia and Herzegovina, found in the Cave Vrelo Mokranjske Miljacke near Kadino Selo, Pale, in the Republika Srpska.
