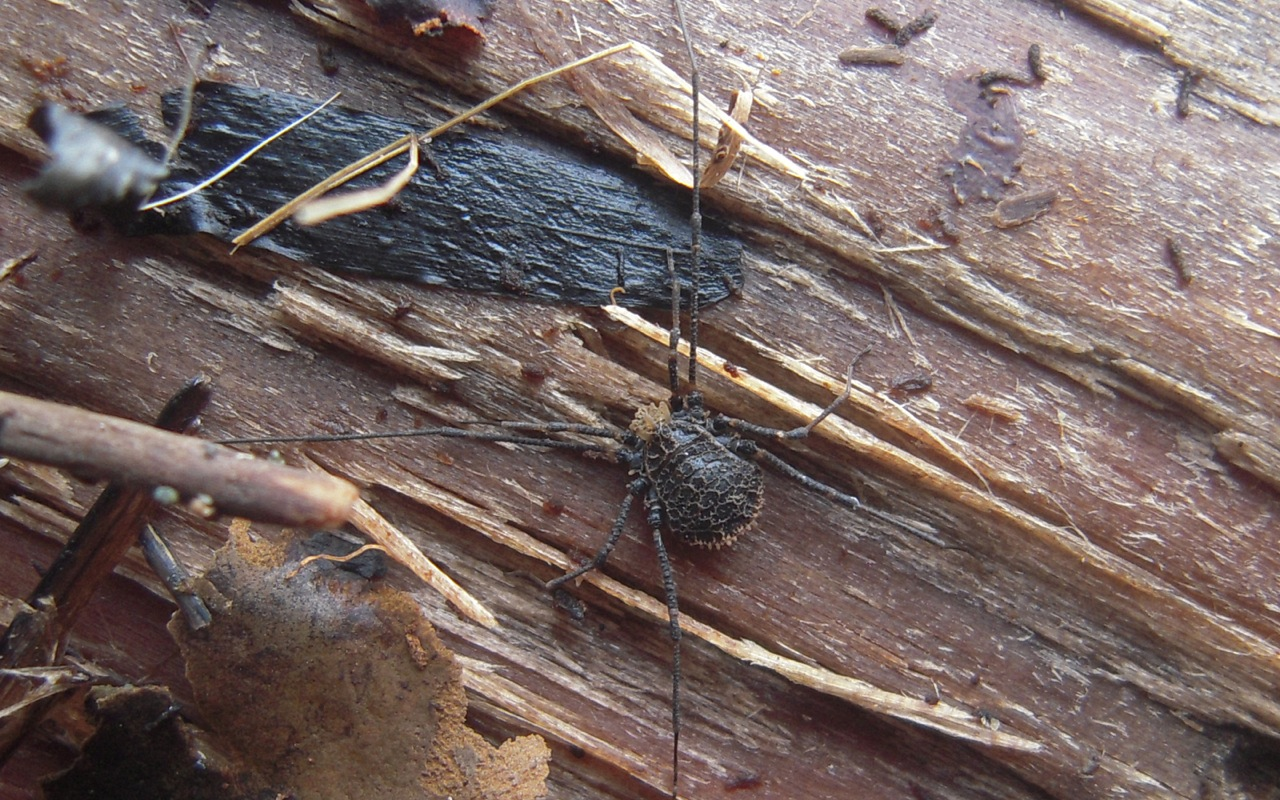
- Dendrolasma mirabile

Scientific classification
- Domain: Eukaryota
- Kingdom: Animalia
- Phylum: Arthropoda
- Subphylum: Chelicerata
- Class: Arachnida
- Order: Opiliones
- Family: Nemastomatidae
- Subfamily: Ortholasmatinae
- Genus: Dendrolasma
- Species: D. mirabile

Binomial name
- Dendrolasma mirabile Banks, 1894

= Dendrolasma mirabile =

Species of harvestman/daddy longlegs

Dendrolasma mirabile is a species of harvestman in the family Nemastomatidae. It is found in North America, in the Pacific Northwest of the USA and Canada. The species was described by Nathan Banks, who reported the original specimen from USA, "Washington State", consistent with later records over a wider geographic range.

== Description ==
Dendrolasma mirabile is said to differ from Dendrolasma dentipalpe by the large-celled network of keels, rather than a small-celled network. Males of Dendrolasma mirabile also have less exaggerated cheliceral modifications and lack the mediodistal tooth found on the palpal patella in males of Dendrolasma dentipalpe.
