= Ortholasma colossus =

Scientific classification
- Domain: Eukaryota
- Kingdom: Animalia
- Phylum: Arthropoda
- Subphylum: Chelicerata
- Class: Arachnida
- Order: Opiliones
- Family: Nemastomatidae
- Genus: Ortholasma
- Species: O. colossus

Binomial name
- Ortholasma colossus Shear, 2010

Species of harvestman/daddy longlegs

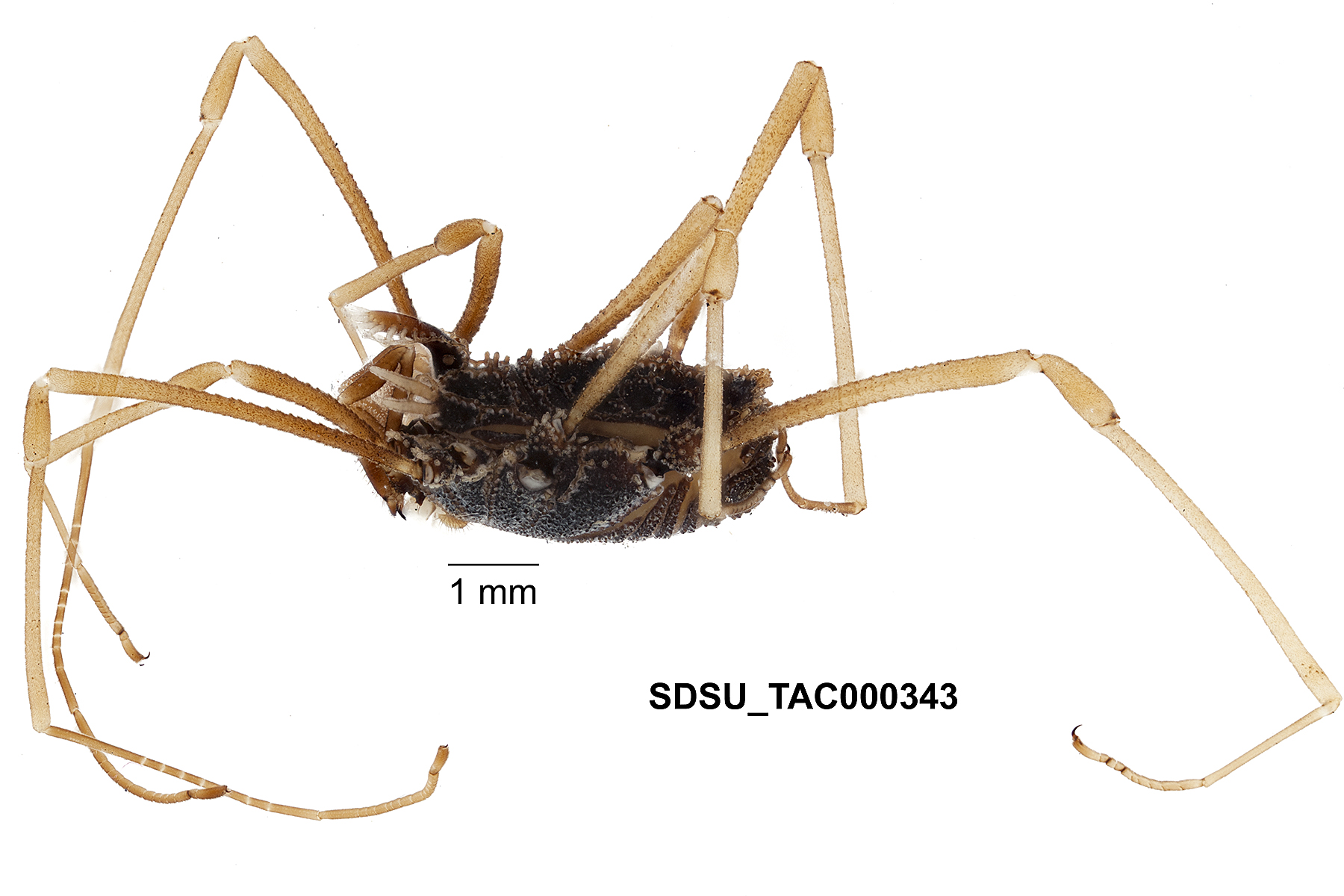

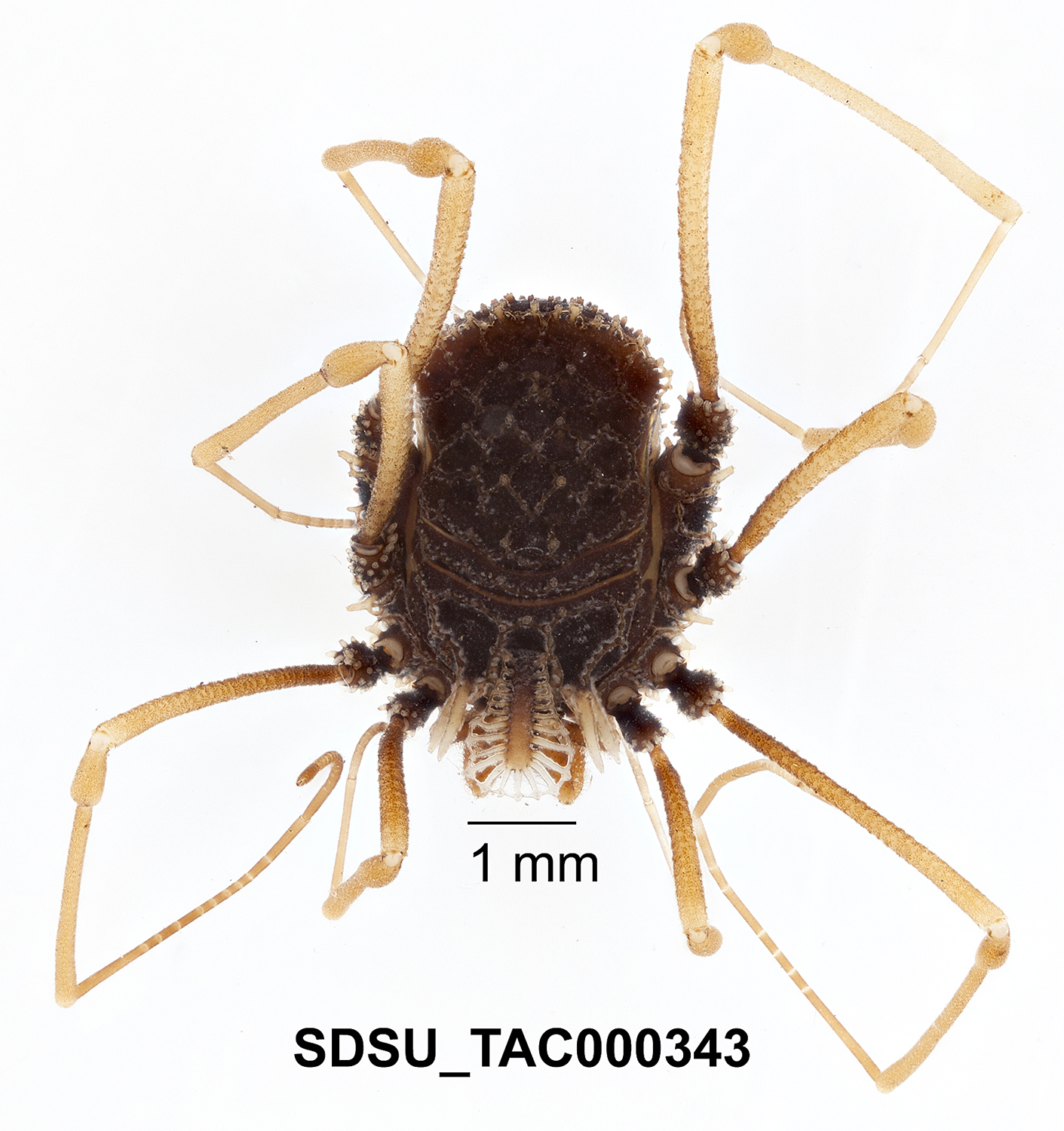

Ortholasma colossus is a species of harvestman in the family Nemastomatidae. It is found in North America.
