= Dendrolasma dentipalpe =

Scientific classification
- Domain: Eukaryota
- Kingdom: Animalia
- Phylum: Arthropoda
- Subphylum: Chelicerata
- Class: Arachnida
- Order: Opiliones
- Family: Nemastomatidae
- Subfamily: Ortholasmatinae
- Genus: Dendrolasma
- Species: D. dentipalpe

Binomial name
- Dendrolasma dentipalpe Shear & Gruber, 1983

Species of harvestman/daddy longlegs

Dendrolasma dentipalpe is a species of harvestman in the family Nemastomatidae. It is found in North America, in USA California. The species was described by Shear & Gruber, 1983, who reported the holotype from the US in "Carlotta, Humboldt County", alongside other Californian specimens.

== Description ==
Dendrolasma dentipalpe is said to differ from Dendrolasma mirabile by the intricate, small-celled keel lattice, and its relatively shorter legs. The males are said to have more exaggerated cheliceral modifications than Dendrolasma mirabile, plus have a notable medioapical tooth of the male palpal patella. Also the very long penis with an elongated glans.
