= Giljarovia =

Scientific classification
- Domain: Eukaryota
- Kingdom: Animalia
- Phylum: Arthropoda
- Subphylum: Chelicerata
- Class: Arachnida
- Order: Opiliones
- Family: Nemastomatidae
- Subfamily: Nemastomatinae
- Genus: Giljarovia; Kratochvíl, 1958

Type species
- Giljarovia rossica Kratochvíl, 1958

Diversity
- 11 species

Genus of harvestmen/daddy longlegs

Giljarovia is a genus of harvestmen in the family Nemastomatidae with 11 described species from the Caucasus region.

== Species ==
There are currently 11 described species in the genus Giljarovia

- Giljarovia crimeana Chemeris & Kovblyuk, 2012 — Crimea, Ukraine
- Giljarovia kratochvili Snegovaya, 2011 — Krasnodar Krai, Russia
- Giljarovia redikorzevi Charitonov, 1946 — Imereti, Georgia
- Giljarovia rossica Kratochvíl, 1958 — Krasnodar Krai, Russia
- Giljarovia stridula (Kratochvíl, 1958) — Krasnodar Krai, Russia
- Giljarovia tenebricosa (Redikortsev, 1936) — Abkhasia, Georgia to Ganja-Qazakh, Azerbaijan, and Artvin, Turkey
- Giljarovia thoracocornuta Martens, 2006 — Dagestan, Russia
- Giljarovia triangula Martens, 2006 — Adygea to North Ossetia, Russia, & Mtskheta-Mtianeti, Georgia
- Giljarovia trianguloides Martens, 2006 — Adygea & Krasnodar Krai, Russia
- Giljarovia turica Gruber, 1976 — Black Sea Region, Turkey
- Giljarovia vestita Martens, 2006 — Adygea, Russia to Samegrelo-Zemo Svaneti, Georgia
