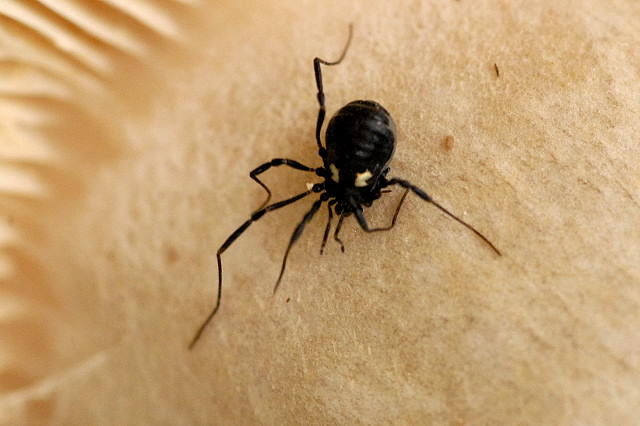
- Nemastoma bimaculatum from Belgium

Scientific classification
- Kingdom: Animalia
- Phylum: Arthropoda
- Subphylum: Chelicerata
- Class: Arachnida
- Order: Opiliones
- Superfamily: Troguloidea
- Family: Nemastomatidae; Simon, 1872

Subfamilies
- Ortholasmatinae Shear & Gruber, 1983; Nemastomatinae Simon, 1872

Diversity
- c. 170 species

= Nemastomatidae =

Nemastomatidae Temporal range: Palaeogene–present

Family of harvestmen/daddy longlegs

The Nemastomatidae are a family of harvestmen with about 170 described species in 16 recent genera. Several fossil species and genera are known.

Unlike some related currently recognized families, the Nemastomatidae are monophyletic.

== Description ==
Members of the Nemastomatidae range in body length from about one to almost six millimeters. Their chelicerae are of normal proportions, but the pedipalps are very elongated and thin in some groups. Leg length is likewise variable.

== Distribution ==
The Nemastomatidae are divided into two subfamilies. The subfamily Ortholasmatinae occur on both sides of the Pacific Ocean: in western North America from Alaska and British Columbia to Mexico and possibly Honduras, but also eastern Asia (China, Japan Thailand and Vietnam). The subfamily Nemastomatinae occur across Europe and near, including Iceland and the Caucasus, plus in the Atlas Mountains of North Africa, from Anatolia to northern Iran. A few species are found outside this region in Central Asia and the Himalayas. Most species are geographically restricted to small zones in mountainous regions.

== Relationships ==
The Nemastomatidae are probably a sister group to the Dicranolasmatidae and Trogulidae.

== Name ==
The genus name Nemastoma is a combination of Ancient Greek nema "thread" and stoma "mouth", referring to the elongated pedipalps.

== Species ==
For complete breakdown, see the following (as of 2023):

For a broader recent listing of species see:

=== Subfamily Nemastomatinae ===
- Acromitostoma Roewer, 1951

- Acromitostoma hispanum (Roewer, 1917) – Spain
- Acromitostoma rhinoceros Roewer, 1951 – Spain, Morocco

- Burnia Prieto, 2021

- Burnia sexmucronata (Simon, 1911) – Spain
- Burnia spelaea Prieto, 2021 – Spain

- Carinostoma Kratochvíl, 1958

- Carinostoma carinatum (Roewer, 1914) – southeastern Europe
- Carinostoma elegans (Sørensen, 1894) – southeastern Europe
- Carinostoma ornatum (Hadzi, 1940) – southeastern Europe

- Caucnemastoma Martens, 2006

- Caucnemastoma golovatchi Martens, 2006 – Russia
- Caucnemastoma martensi Snegovaya, 2011 – Russia

- Centetostoma Kratochvíl, 1958

- Centetostoma centetes (Simon, 1881) – France (Alps)
- Centetostoma juberthiei Martens, 2011 – France/Spain (Pyrenees)
- Centetostoma scabriculum (Simon, 1879) – France/Spain (Pyrenees)
- Centetostoma ventalloi (Mello-Leitao, 1936) – France/Spain (Pyrenees)

- Giljarovia Kratochvíl, 1958

- Giljarovia crimeana Tchemeris & Kovblyuk, 2012 – Ukraine
- Giljarovia kratochvili Snegovaya, 2011 – Russia
- Giljarovia redikorzevi Charitonov, 1946 – Georgia
- Giljarovia rossica Kratochvíl, 1958 – Russia
- Giljarovia stridula (Kratochvíl, 1958) – Russia
- Giljarovia tenebricosa (Redikortsev, 1936) – Georgia, Azerbaijan, Turkey
- Giljarovia thoracocornuta Martens, 2006 – Russia
- Giljarovia triangula Martens, 2006 – Russia, Georgia
- Giljarovia trianguloides Martens, 2006 – Russia
- Giljarovia turcica Gruber, 1976 – Turkey
- Giljarovia vestita Martens, 2006 – Russia, Georgia

- Hadzinia Šilhavý, 1966

- Hadzinia ferrani Novak & Kozel, 2014 – Slovenia
- Hadzinia karamani (Hadzi, 1940) – Bosnia & Herzegovina, Croatia

- Histricostoma Kratochvíl, 1958

- Histricostoma anatolicum (Roewer, 1962) – Turkey
- Histricostoma argenteolunulatum (Canestrini, 1875) – France (Corsica), Italy, Greece
- Histricostoma caucasicum (Redikorzev, 1936) – Russia
- Histricostoma creticum (Roewer, 1928) – Greece
- Histricostoma dentipalpe (Ausserer, 1867) – Central Europe
- Histricostoma drenskii Kratochvíl, 1958 – Bulgaria
- Histricostoma gruberi Snegovaya & Marusik, 2012 – Turkey
- Histricostoma mitovi Snegovaya & Marusik, 2012 – Turkey

- Mediostoma Kratochvíl, 1958

- Mediostoma armatum Martens, 2006 – Iran
- Mediostoma ceratocephalum Gruber, 1976 – Turkey
- Mediostoma cypricum (Roewer, 1951) – Greece/Turkey: Cyprus, Israel, Lebanon,
- Mediostoma globuliferum (L. Koch, 1867) – Greece
- Mediostoma humerale (C.L. Koch, 1839) – Greece, Albania
- Mediostoma izmirica Snegovaya, Kurt, & Yağmur, 2016 – Turkey
- Mediostoma nigrum Martens, 2006 – Iran, Azerbaijan
- Mediostoma pamiricum Staręga, 1986 – Tajikistan
- Mediostoma stussineri (Simon, 1885) – Greece
- Mediostoma talischense (Morin, 1937) – Azerbaijan
- Mediostoma variabile Martens, 2006 – Iran, Azerbaijan
- Mediostoma vityae (Roewer, 1927) – Greece

- Mitostoma Roewer, 1951

- Mitostoma alpinum (Hadži, 1931) – Southeastern Europe
- Mitostoma anophthalmum (Fage, 1946) – Italy
- Mitostoma atticum (Roewer, 1928) – Greece
- Mitostoma cancellatum (Roewer, 1917) – Balkans
- Mitostoma carneluttii Hadži, 1973 – Montenegro
- Mitostoma chrysomelas (Hermann, 1804) – Europe (widespread)
- Mitostoma daccordii Tedeschi & Sciaky, 1997 – Italy
- Mitostoma fabianae Tedescie & Sciaky, 1997 – Italy
- Mitostoma gracile (Redikortsev, 1936) – Russia, Georgia, etc.
- Mitostoma macedonicum Hadži, 1973 – Macedonia
- Mitostoma olgae (Šilhavý, 1939) – (see below Balkans)

- Mitostoma olgae decorum (Šilhavý, 1939) – Montenegro
- Mitostoma olgae kratochvili (Šilhavý, 1939) – Croatia
- Mitostoma olgae olgae (Šilhavý, 1939) – Montenegro
- Mitostoma olgae zorae Hadži, 1973 – Macedonia

- Mitostoma orobicum (Caporiacco, 1949) – Italy
- Mitostoma patrizii Roewer, 1953 – Italy
- Mitostoma pyrenaeum (Simon, 1879) – France/Spain (Pyrenees)
- Mitostoma sabbadinii Tedeschi & Sciaky – Italy
- Mitostoma valdemonense Marcellino, 1974 – Italy
- Mitostoma zmajevicae Hadži, 1973 – Macedonia

- Nemaspela Silhavý, 1966

- Nemaspela abchasica Ljovuschkin & Starobogatov, 1963 – Russia, Georgia/Abkhazia
- Nemaspela birsteini Levushkii, 1972 – Georgia/Abkhazia
- Nemaspela borkoae Kozel, Delić & Novak, 2020 – Montenegro
- Nemaspela caeca (Grese, 1911) – Ukraine (Crimea) [Can be "Grese in Nowikoff, 1911. Else, possibly should incl. Phalangodes taurica (Lebedinskiy, 1914) per Chemeris (2009)].
- Nemaspela femorecurvata Martens, 2006 – Georgia
- Nemaspela gagrica Tchemeris, 2013 – Georgia/Abkhazia
- Nemaspela kovali Tchemeris, 2009 – Russia
- Nemaspela ladae Karaman, 2013 – Bosnia & Herzegovina
- Nemaspela melouri Martens, Maghradze & Barjadze, 2021 – Georgia
- Nemaspela prometheusi Martens, Maghradze & Barjadze, 2021 – Georgia
- Nemaspela sokolovi (Ljovuschkin & Starobogatov, 1963) – Russia
- Nemaspela taurica (Lebedinski, 1914) – Ukraine (Crimea) (See as synonym under Nemaspela caeca per some e.g. Chemeris (2009).

- Nemastoma C. L. Koch, 1836

- Nemastoma bidentatum Roewer, 1914 – Europe

- Nemastoma bidentatum bidentatum Roewer, 1914 – Central Europe, Southeastern Europe
- Nemastoma bidentatum gruberi Novak, Slana Novak, Kozel & Raspotnig, 2021 – Southern Europe
- Nemastoma bidentatum martensi Novak, Slana Novak & Raspotnig, 2021 – Slovenia
- Nemastoma bidentatum schmidti Novak, Raspotnig & Slana Novak, 2021 – Central Europe, Southern Europe
- Nemastoma bidentatum sneznikensis Novak, Komposch, Slana Novak & Raspotnig, 2021 – Slovenia
- Nemastoma bidentatum sparsum Gruber & Martens, 1968 – Central Europe, Southeastern Europe

- Nemastoma bimaculatum (Fabricius, 1775) – Europe (Widespread), Iceland
- Nemastoma daciscum Koch, 1869 – (?) [Insertae sedis ].
- Nemastoma dentigerum Canestrini, 1873 – Europe (Widespread)
- Nemastoma kozari Novak, Kozel, Podlesnik & Raspotnig, 2021 – Bosnia & Herzegovina
- Nemastoma lilliputanum (Lucas, 1846) – Algeria [Insertae sedis ].
- Nemastoma lugubre (Müller, 1776) – Europe (Widespread)
- Nemastoma pluridentatum (Hadži, 1973) – Balkans
- Nemastoma relictum (Gruber & Martens, 1968) – Austria
- Nemastoma rude Simon, 1881 – France [Insertae sedis ].
- Nemastoma schuelleri Gruber & Martens, 1968 – Austria
- Nemastoma transsylvanicum Gruber & Martens, 1968 – Romania
- Nemastoma triste (C.L. Koch, 1835) – Central Europe

- Nemastomella Mello-Leitão, 1936

- Nemastomella armatissima (Roewer, 1962) – Portugal
- Nemastomella bacillifera (Simon, 1879) – Western Europe

- Nemastomella bacillifera bacillifera (Simon, 1879) – France/Spain (Pyrenees)
- Nemastomella bacillifera carbonaria (Simon, 1907) – Spain

- Nemastomella cristinae (Rambla, 1969) – Spain
- Nemastomella dentipatellae (Dresco, 1967) – Spain
- Nemastomella dipentata (Rambla, 1959) – Spain
- Nemastomella dubia (Mello-Leitão, 1936) – Spain [Inc. N. integripes Mello-Leitão, 1936, synonymy by Staręga 1987: 303].
- Nemastomella gevia Prieto, 2004 – Spain
- Nemastomella hankiewiczii (Kulczyński, 1909) – Portugal
- Nemastomella iberica (Rambla in Dresco, 1967) – Spain
- Nemastomella maarebensis (Simon, 1913) – Algeria
- Nemastomella manicata (Simon, 1913) – Spain
- Nemastomella monchiquensis (Kraus, 1961) – Portugal
- Nemastomella spinosissima (Kraus, 1961) – Spain

- Paranemastoma Redikorzev, 1936

- Paranemastoma aeginum (Roewer, 1951) – Greece [Nomen dubium ]
- Paranemastoma amseli (Roewer, 1951) – Italy [Nomen dubium ]
- Paranemastoma amuelleri (Roewer, 1951) – Macedonia [Nomen dubium ]
- Paranemastoma ancae Avram, 1973 – Romania
- Paranemastoma armatum (Kulczyński, 1909) – Balkans
- Paranemastoma aurigerum (Roewer, 1951) – Bulgaria (all subspecies)

- Paranemastoma aurigerum aurigerum (Roewer, 1951) – Bulgaria
- Paranemastoma aurigerum joannae Staręga, 1976 – Bulgaria
- Paranemastoma aurigerum ryla (Roewer, 1951) – Bulgaria

- Paranemastoma aurosum (L. Koch, 1869) – Greece
- Paranemastoma bacurianum (Mkheidze, 1959) – Georgia
- Paranemastoma beroni Mitov, 2011 – Bulgaria
- Paranemastoma bicuspidatum (C.L. Koch, 1835) – Central Europe
- Paranemastoma bolei (Hadži, 1973) – Macedonia [Nomen dubium ]
- Paranemastoma brevipalpatum (Roewer, 1951) – Spain [Nomen dubium ]
- Paranemastoma bureschi (Roewer, 1926) – Bulgaria, Tunisia (?)
- Paranemastoma caporiaccoi (Roewer, 1951) – Italy [Nomen dubium ]
- Paranemastoma carneluttii (Hadži, 1973) – Montenegro [Nomen dubium ]
- Paranemastoma corcyraeum (Roewer, 1917) – Balkans
- Paranemastoma emigratum (Roewer, 1959 – India (?) [Nomen dubium ]
- Paranemastoma ferkeri (Roewer, 1951) – Turkey [Nomen dubium ]
- Paranemastoma filipes (Roewer, 1917) – South Caucasus, Iran
- Paranemastoma gostivarense (Hadži, 1973) – Macedonia [Nomen dubium ]
- Paranemastoma ikarium (Roewer, 1951) – Greece [Nomen dubium ]
- Paranemastoma ios (Roewer, 1917) – Greece [Nomen dubium ]
- Paranemastoma iranicum Martens, 2006 – Iran
- Paranemastoma kaestneri (Roewer, 1951) – Greece [Nomen dubium ]
- Paranemastoma kalischevskyi (Roewer, 1951) – South Caucasus
- Paranemastoma karolianum Çorak Öcal, Bayram, Yiğit & Sancak, 2017 – Turkey
- Paranemastoma kochii (Nowicki, 1870) – Central Europe, Southeastern Europe
- Paranemastoma longipalpatum (Roewer, 1951) – Greece [Nomen dubium ]
- Paranemastoma longipes (Schenkel, 1947) – Southeastern Europe
- Paranemastoma macedonicum (Hadži, 1973) – Macedonia [Nomen dubium ]
- Paranemastoma machadoi (Roewer, 1951) – Spain [Nomen dubium ]
- Paranemastoma mackenseni (Roewer, 1923) – Serbia [Nomen dubium ]
- Paranemastoma montenigrinum (Nosek, 1904) – Montenegro [Nomen dubium ]
- Paranemastoma monticola (Babalean, 2011) – Romania
- Paranemastoma multisignatum (Hadži, 1973) – Macedonia [Nomen dubium ]
- Paranemastoma nigrum (Hadži, 1973) – Macedonia [Nomen dubium ]
- Paranemastoma perfugium (Roewer, 1951) – Italy [Nomen dubium ]
- Paranemastoma quadripunctatum (Perty, 1833) – Europe (widespread)
- Paranemastoma radewi (Roewer, 1926) – Southeastern Europe
- Paranemastoma redikorzevi (Roewer, 1951) – Ukraine [Nomen dubium ]
- Paranemastoma santorinum (Roewer, 1951) – Greece [Nomen dubium ]
- Paranemastoma senussium (Roewer, 1951) – Lybia [Nomen dubium ]
- Paranemastoma sillii (Herman, 1871) – Central Europe, Southeastern Europe
- Paranemastoma simplex (Giltay, 1932) – Greece
- Paranemastoma sketi (Hadži, 1973) – Montenegro [Nomen dubium ] – Central Europe, Southeastern Europe
- Paranemastoma spinosulum (Koch, 1869) – Greece [Nomen dubium ]
- Paranemastoma superbum Redikorzev, 1936 – Georgia, Turkey
- Paranemastoma thessalum (Simon, 1885) – Greece, Bosnia & Herzegovina (?)
- Paranemastoma titaniacum (Roewer, 1914) – Southeastern Europe
- Paranemastoma umbo (Roewer, 1951) – Georgia [Nomen dubium ]
- Paranemastoma werneri (Kulczyński, 1903) – Turkey

- Pyza Starega, 1976

- Pyza anatolica (Roewer, 1959) – Turkey
- Pyza bosnica (Roewer, 1919) – Balkans
- Pyza navarrense (Roewer, 1951) – Greece
- Pyza taurica Gruber, 1979 – Turkey

- Saccarella Schönhofer & Martens, 2012

- Saccarella schilleri Schönhofer & Martens, 2012 – Italy

- Sinostoma Martens, 2016

- Sinostoma yunnanicum Martens, 2016 – China

- Starengovia Snegovaya, 2010

- Starengovia ivanloebli Martens, 2017 – Pakistan
- Starengovia kirgizica Snegovaya, 2010 – Kyrgyzstan
- Starengovia quadrituberculata Zhang & Martens, 2018 – China

- Vestiferum Martens, 2006

- Vestiferum alatum Martens, 2006 – Georgia, Turkey
- Vestiferum funebre (Redikorzev, 1936) – Georgia/Abkhazia, Russia (also possibly turkey)

=== Subfamily Ortholasmatinae ===
- Asiolasma Martens, 2009 (6 species, Eastern Asia)

- Asiolasma ailaoshan (Zhang, Zhao & Zhang, 2018) – China
- Asiolasma angka (Schwendinger & Gruber, 1992) – Thailand
- Asiolasma billsheari Martens, 2019 – China
- Asiolasma damingshan (Zhang & Zhang, 2013) – China
- Asiolasma juergengruberi Martens, 2019 – China
- Asiolasma schwendingeri Martens, 2019 – Vietnam

- Balticolasma Bartel, 2026 (1 species, Eastern Europe)

- Balticolasma wunderlichi (Bartel, 2026) – Eastern Europe

- Cladolasma Suzuki, 1963 (1 species, Japan)

- Cladolasma parvulum Suzuki, 1963 – Japan

- Cryptolasma Cruz-López, Cruz-Bonilla & Francke, 2018 (2 species, Eastern Mexico)

- Cryptolasma aberrante Cruz-López, Cruz-Bonilla & Francke, 2018 – Mexico
- Cryptolasma citlaltepetl Cruz-López, Cruz-Bonilla & Francke, 2018 – Mexico

- Dendrolasma Banks, 1894 (1 species, Western USA)

- Dendrolasma dentipalpe Shear & Gruber, 1983 – USA (California)
- Dendrolasma mirabile Banks, 1894 – USA (Washington, etc), Canada

- Martensolasma Shear, 20064 (2 species, (Central Mexico)

- Martensolasma catrina Cruz-López, 2017 – Mexico
- Martensolasma jocheni Shear, 2006 – Mexico

- Ortholasma Banks, 1894 (5 species, Western USA, Northwestern Mexico)

- Ortholasma colossus Shear, 2010 – USA (California)
- Ortholasma coronadense Cockerell, 1916 – USA (California), Mexico (Coronados Islands)
- Ortholasma levipes Shear & Gruber, 1983 – USA (California)
- Ortholasma pictipes Banks, 1911 – USA (California)
- Ortholasma rugosum Banks, 1894 – USA (California)

- Trilasma Goodnight & Goodnight, 1942 (9 species, Mexico, Honduras)

- Trilasma bolivari Goodnight & Goodnight, 1942 – Mexico
- Trilasma chipinquense Shear, 2010 – Mexico
- Trilasma hidalgo Shear, 2010 – Mexico
- Trilasma petersprousei Shear, 2010 – Mexico
- Trilasma ranchonuevo Shear, 2010 – Mexico
- Trilasma sbordonii (Šilhavý, 1973) – Mexico
- Trilasma tempestado Shear, 2010 – Mexico
- Trilasma trispinosum Shear, 2010 – Mexico
- Trilasma tropicum Shear, 2010 – Honduras

== fossil ==
- † Nemastoma tuberculatum Koch & Berendt, 1854 — fossil: Oligocene
- † Nemastoma succineum Roewer, 1939 — fossil: Baltic amber

=== incertae sedis ===
- † Rhabdotarachnoides Haupt, 1956 — fossil

- † Rhabdotarachnoides simoni Haupt, 1956 — Permian
