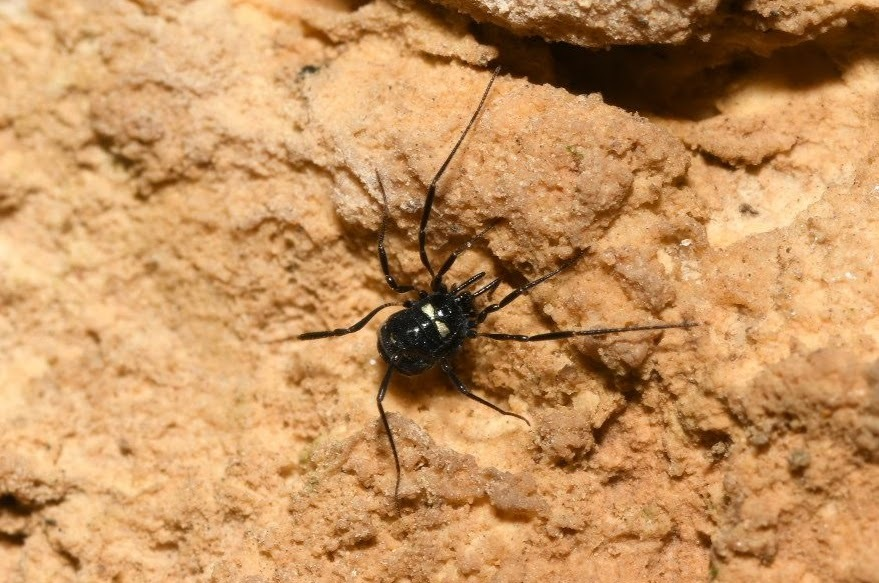

Scientific classification
- Domain: Eukaryota
- Kingdom: Animalia
- Phylum: Arthropoda
- Subphylum: Chelicerata
- Class: Arachnida
- Order: Opiliones
- Family: Nemastomatidae
- Genus: Carinostoma
- Species: C. elegans

Binomial name
- Carinostoma elegans (Sørensen, 1894)

Subspecies
- Carinostoma elegans elegans (Sørensen, 1894); Carinostoma elegans batorligetiense (Szalay, 1951)

= Carinostoma elegans =

Species of harvestman/daddy longlegs

Carinostoma elegans is a species of nemastomatid harvestman found in south-eastern Europe, with its distribution within the Carpathian Mountains.
