= Nemaspela borkoae =

Scientific classification
- Kingdom: Animalia
- Phylum: Arthropoda
- Subphylum: Chelicerata
- Class: Arachnida
- Order: Opiliones
- Family: Nemastomatidae
- Genus: Nemaspela
- Species: N. borkoae

Binomial name
- Nemaspela borkoae Kozel, Delić & Novak, 2020

Species of harvestmen

Nemaspela borkoae is a species of harvestmen in the family Nemastomatidae. It is found in Montenegro.

== Distribution ==
This species is endemic to Montenegro. It is known only from several karst caves in the coastal mountain regions, including Lovćen, Krivošije, and Grahovo. Specimens have been collected from four caves: Dvogrla jama (the type locality), PT4 cave, Vodna jama, and Pala Skala cave. All individuals were found in the deep, dark zones of these caves on wet flowstone walls.
