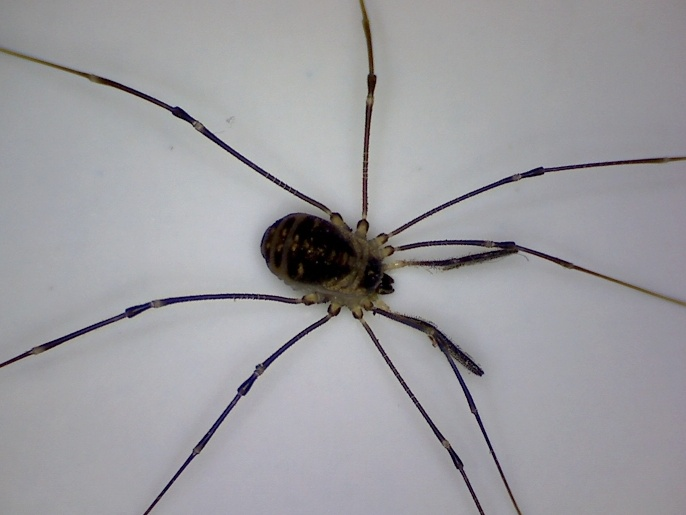

Scientific classification
- Kingdom: Animalia
- Phylum: Arthropoda
- Subphylum: Chelicerata
- Class: Arachnida
- Order: Opiliones
- Family: Nemastomatidae
- Genus: Mitostoma
- Species: M. chrysomelas

Binomial name
- Mitostoma chrysomelas (Hermann, 1804)

= Mitostoma chrysomelas =

Species of harvestman

Mitostoma chrysomelas is an harvestmen species widely distributed in Central Europe, British Isles, France and Southeast to Bulgaria.
