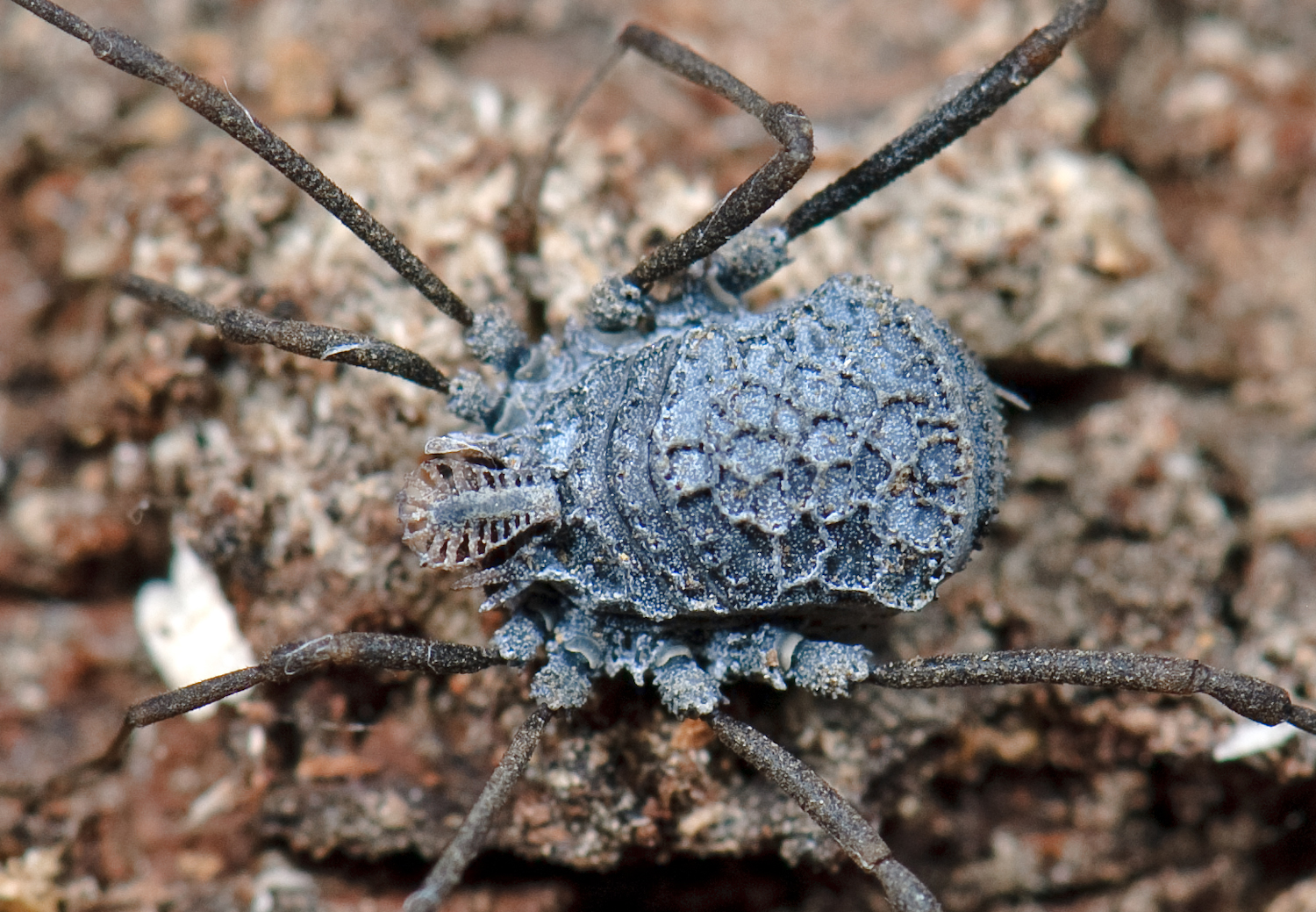
- Ortholasma colossus

Scientific classification
- Kingdom: Animalia
- Phylum: Arthropoda
- Subphylum: Chelicerata
- Class: Arachnida
- Order: Opiliones
- Suborder: Dyspnoi
- Superfamily: Troguloidea
- Family: Nemastomatidae
- Subfamily: Ortholasmatinae; Shear & Gruber, 1983

Genera
- World Catalog of Opiliones: Asiolasma; Balticolasma; Cladolasma; Cryptolasma; Dendrolasma; Martensolasma; Ortholasma; Trilasma

Diversity
- 7 genera, 27 species

= Ortholasmatinae =

Subfamily of harvestmen/daddy longlegs

Ortholasmatinae is a subfamily of harvestmen in the family Nemastomatidae with 27 described species in 7 genera. They are found in temperate and often mountainous regions of the Northern Hemisphere.

== Species ==
For complete breakdown, see Nemastomatidae, or:

The genera are as follows (as of 2023):

- Asiolasma Martens, 2019 (6 species) — Eastern Asia, Southeast Asia
- Balticolasma Bartel, 2026 (1 species) — Eastern Europe
- Cladolasma Suzuki, 1963 (1 species) — Japan
- Cryptolasma Cruz-López, Cruz-Bonilla & Francke, 2018 (2 species) — Mexico (Eastern States)
- Dendrolasma Banks, 1894 (2 species) — USA, Canada (West Coast North America)
- Martensolasma Shear, 2006 (2 species) — Mexico (Central Zone)
- Ortholasma Banks, 1894 (5 species) — USA (California), Mexico (Baja California)
- Trilasma Goodnight & Goodnight, 1942 (9 species) — Mexico, Honduras
