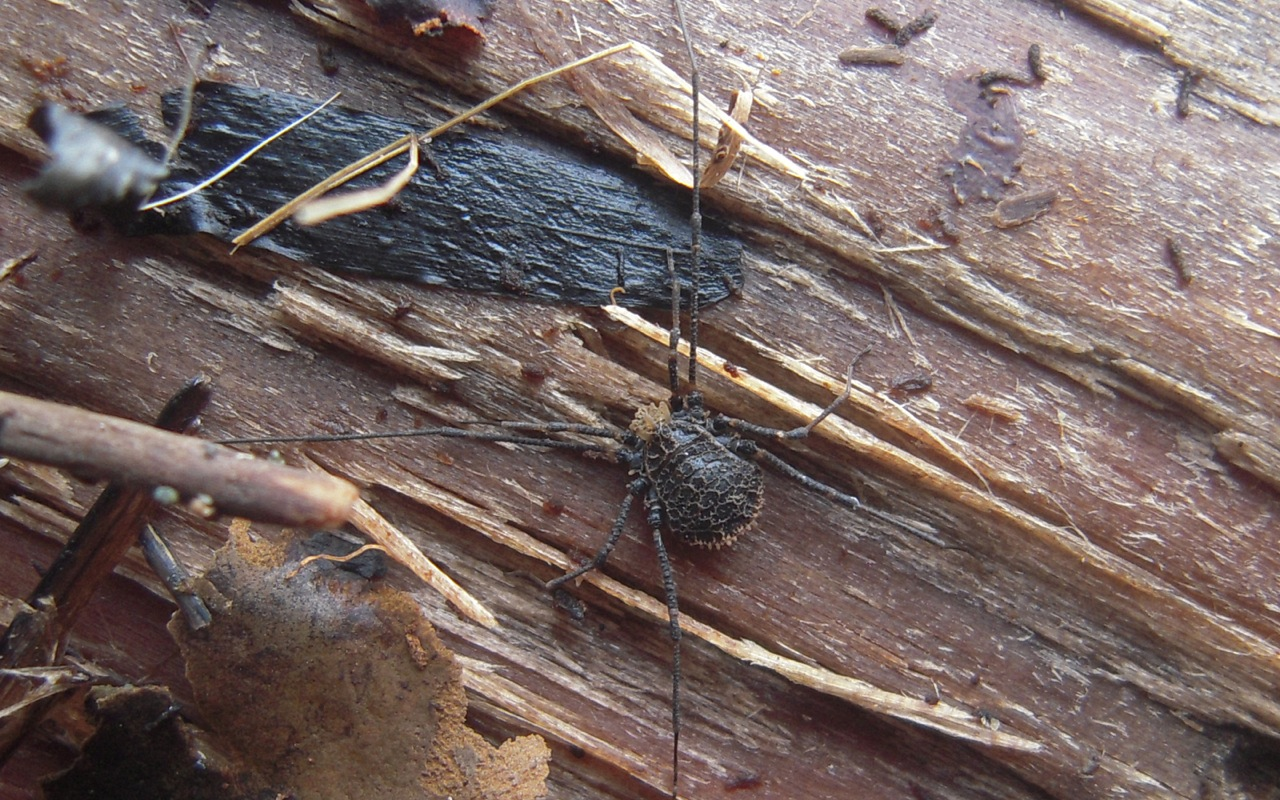
- Dendrolasma mirabile

Scientific classification
- Domain: Eukaryota
- Kingdom: Animalia
- Phylum: Arthropoda
- Subphylum: Chelicerata
- Class: Arachnida
- Order: Opiliones
- Family: Nemastomatidae
- Subfamily: Ortholasmatinae
- Genus: Dendrolasma; Banks, 1894

Type species
- Dendrolasma mirabile Banks, 1894

Diversity
- 2 spp. (see text)

= Dendrolasma =

Genus of harvestmen/daddy longlegs

Dendrolasma is a genus of harvestmen in the family Nemastomatidae with two described species (as of 2023). Both species are found in the western coast of North America. An overview of their taxonomy was provided by Schönhofer (2013).

== Description ==
The genus Dendrolasma was described in 1894 by Nathan Banks with the type species Dendrolasma mirabile. In the past, additional species were included but have since been placed in Asiolasma or Cladolasma.

== Species ==
These two species belong to the genus Dendrolasma:

- Dendrolasma dentipalpe Shear & Gruber, 1983 – USA (California)
- Dendrolasma mirabile Banks, 1894 – USA (Washington, etc); Canada (British Columbia, etc)

== Etymology ==
The genus is neuter. The appropriate gender agreement was originally overlooked by Banks when describing "D. mirabilis", but the suffix was subsequently amended to the neuter "mirabile" by Martens (1978), and adopted by later authors.
