= Ortholasma coronadense =

Scientific classification
- Domain: Eukaryota
- Kingdom: Animalia
- Phylum: Arthropoda
- Subphylum: Chelicerata
- Class: Arachnida
- Order: Opiliones
- Family: Nemastomatidae
- Genus: Ortholasma
- Species: O. coronadense

Binomial name
- Ortholasma coronadense Cockerell, 1916

Synonyms
- Ortholasma setulipes Shear and Gruber, 1983

Species of harvestman/daddy longlegs

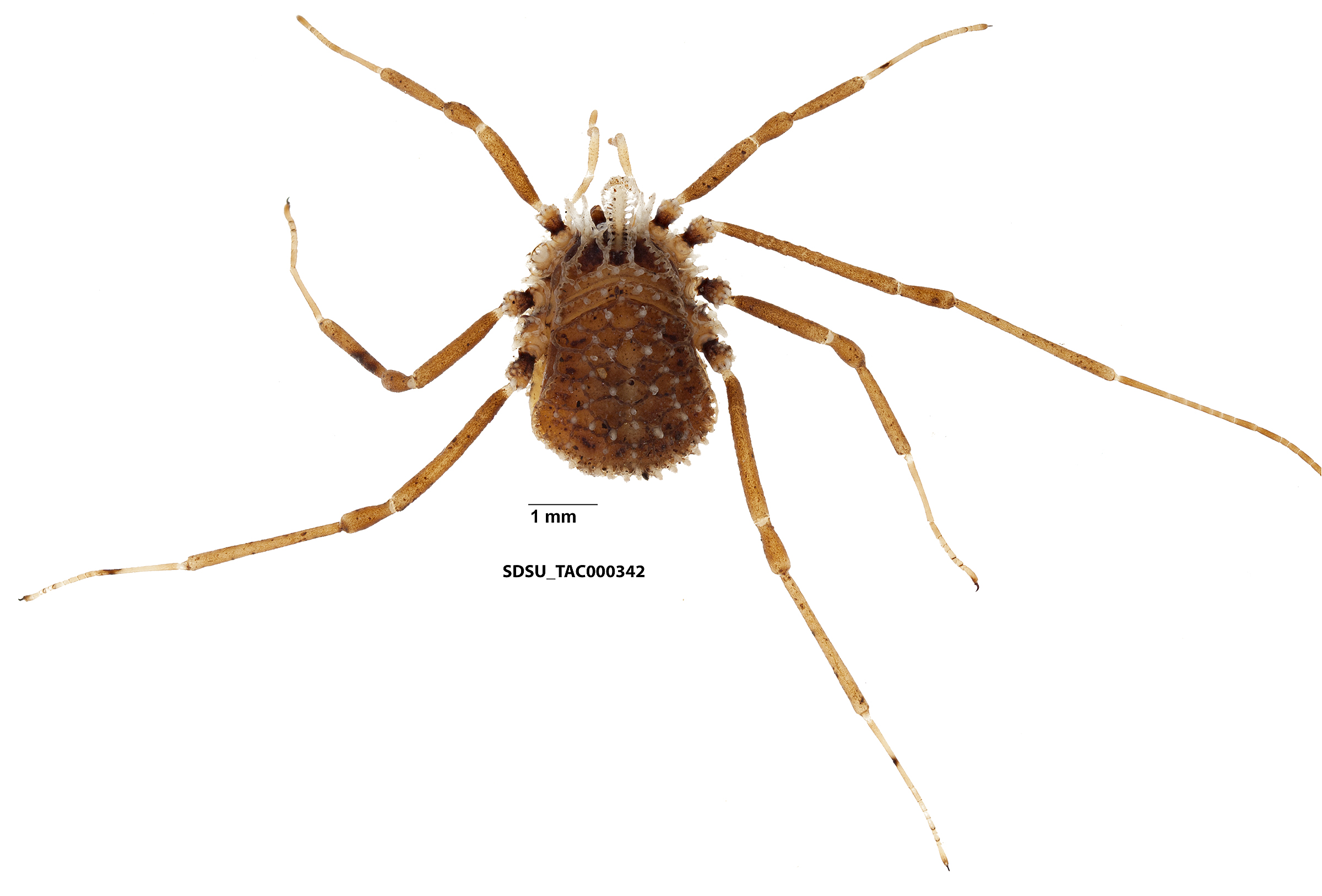

Ortholasma coronadense is a species of harvestman in the family Nemastomatidae. It is found in North America.
