= Caucnemastoma =

Scientific classification
- Domain: Eukaryota
- Kingdom: Animalia
- Phylum: Arthropoda
- Subphylum: Chelicerata
- Class: Arachnida
- Order: Opiliones
- Family: Nemastomatidae
- Subfamily: Nemastomatinae
- Genus: Caucnemastoma; Martens, 2006

Type species
- Caucnemstoma golovatchi Martens, 2006

Diversity
- 2 species

Genus of harvestmen/daddy longlegs

Caucnemastoma is a genus of harvestmen in the family Nemastomatidae with 2 described species from Russia.

== Species ==
There are currently 2 described species in the genus Caucnemastoma:

- Caucnemastoma golovatchi Martens, 2006 — Krasnodar Krai, Adygea, and Karachay-Cherkessia, Russia
- Caucnemastoma martensi Segovaya, 2011 — Krasnodar Krai, Russia
