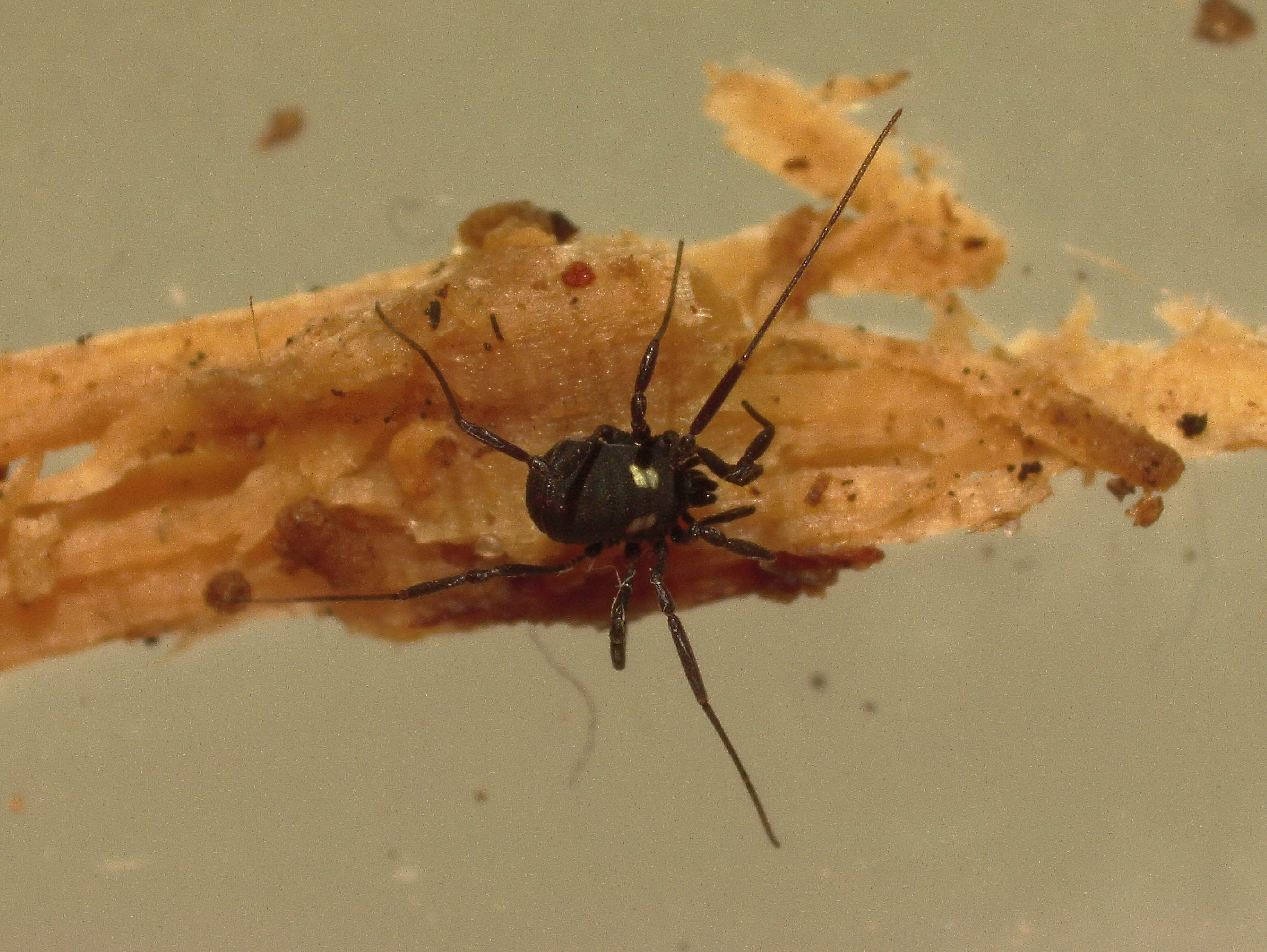

Scientific classification
- Kingdom: Animalia
- Phylum: Arthropoda
- Subphylum: Chelicerata
- Class: Arachnida
- Order: Opiliones
- Family: Nemastomatidae
- Genus: Nemastoma
- Species: N. lugubre

Binomial name
- Nemastoma lugubre (Müller, 1776)

= Nemastoma lugubre =

Species of harvestman/daddy longlegs

Nemastoma lugubre is an harvestmen species found in the whole of Europe from the Arctic to the Mediterranean.

The body is small and rotund and 2.5 mm long. It is black with two large white, pale yellow cream-coloured or silver patches on the cephalothorax. Some specimens lack the patches and are entirely black. The legs are short.

== Subspecies ==
- Nemastoma lugubre lugubre (Müller, 1776)
- Nemastoma lugubre bimaculatum (Fabricius, 1775) — Europe
- Nemastoma lugubre unicolor Roewer, 1914 — southern Europe
