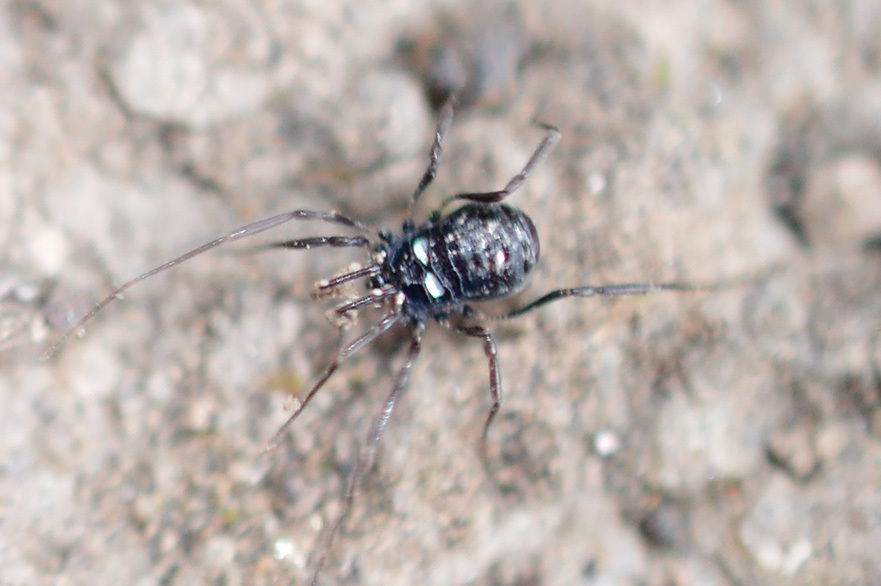
- Carinostoma ornatum

Scientific classification
- Domain: Eukaryota
- Kingdom: Animalia
- Phylum: Arthropoda
- Subphylum: Chelicerata
- Class: Arachnida
- Order: Opiliones
- Family: Nemastomatidae
- Subfamily: Nemastomatinae
- Genus: Carinostoma; Kratochvíl, 1958

Type species
- Nemastoma carinatum Roewer, 1914

Diversity
- Three species

Synonyms
- Mitostoma (Carinostoma) Kratochvíl, 1958; Carcinostoma Kratochvíl, 1958

= Carinostoma =

Genus of harvestmen

Carinostoma is a genus of harvestmen in the family Nemastomatidae with three described species from southeastern Europe.

== Species ==
There are currently three described species in the genus Carinostoma:

- Carinostoma carinatum (Roewer, 1914) — Northern Italy and Austria south to Serbia and Montenegro
- Carinostoma elegans (Sørensen, 1894) — Western Ukraine and Slovakia, south to Serbia and Bulgaria
- Carinostoma ornatum (Hadzi, 1940) — Bosnia & Herzegovina west to Bulgaria, and south to Central Macedonia
