= Acromitostoma =

Scientific classification
- Domain: Eukaryota
- Kingdom: Animalia
- Phylum: Arthropoda
- Subphylum: Chelicerata
- Class: Arachnida
- Order: Opiliones
- Family: Nemastomatidae
- Subfamily: Nemastomatinae
- Genus: Acromitostoma; Roewer, 1951

Type species
- Nemastoma rhinoceros Roewer, 1917

Diversity
- 2 species

Synonyms
- Synonymy: Hispanostoma Kratochvíl 1958

Genus of harvestmen/daddy longlegs

Acromitostoma is a genus of harvestmen in the family Nemastomatidae with 2 described species (as of 2023). Both species are from Spain, and one also originally reported from Morocco.

== Species ==
There are currently 2 described species in the genus Acromitostoma:

- Acromitostoma hispanum (Roewer, 1919) – Spain: Andalusia
- Acromitostoma rhinoceros (Roewer, 1919) – Spain: Andalusia, and Morocco: Casablanca

Note: The alternative spelling rhinocerus is used by Rambla (1983), but is a misspelling.
