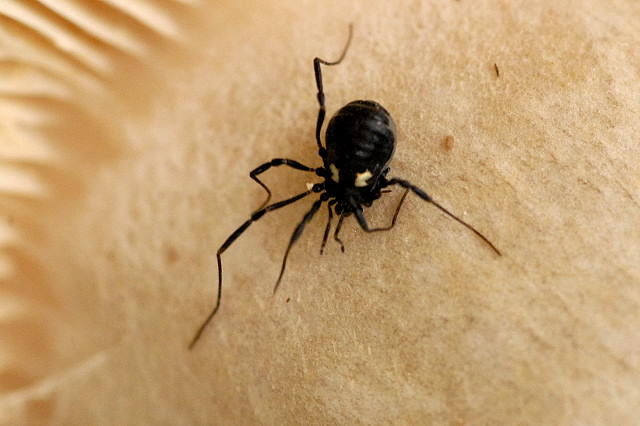
- Nemastoma bimaculatum from Belgium

Scientific classification
- Domain: Eukaryota
- Kingdom: Animalia
- Phylum: Arthropoda
- Subphylum: Chelicerata
- Class: Arachnida
- Order: Opiliones
- Family: Nemastomatidae
- Genus: Nemastoma
- Species: N. bimaculatum

Binomial name
- Nemastoma bimaculatum (Fabricius, 1775)

= Nemastoma bimaculatum =

Species of harvestman/daddy longlegs

Nemastoma bimaculatum is a species of harvestman, in the Nemastomatidae. It is black, with two cream spots on the cephalothorax (rarely all black). It is sometimes known as N. lugubre. It occurs in Britain, Ireland, France, Germany, and Spain.
