= Nemaspela =

Scientific classification
- Kingdom: Animalia
- Phylum: Arthropoda
- Subphylum: Chelicerata
- Class: Arachnida
- Order: Opiliones
- Family: Nemastomatidae
- Genus: Nemaspela; Silhavý, 1966

Genus of arachnids

Nemaspela is a genus of harvestmen in the family Nemastomatidae.

== Systematics ==
Genus Nemaspela consists out of 11 species:

- Nemaspela birsteini Levushkii, 1972
- Nemaspela borkoae Kozel, Delić & Novak, 2020
- Nemaspela femorecurvata Martens, 2006
- Nemaspela gagrica Tchemeris, 2013
- Nemaspela kotia Martens, Maghradze & Barjadze, 2023
- Nemaspela kovali Chemeris, 2009
- Nemaspela ladae Karaman, 2013
- Nemaspela melouri Martens, Maghradze & Barjadze, 2021
- Nemaspela prometheus Martens, Maghradze & Barjadze, 2013
- Nemaspela sokolovi (Ljovuschkin & Starobogatov, 1963)
- Nemaspela taurica (Lebedinskiy, 1914)
