= Hadzinia =

Scientific classification
- Domain: Eukaryota
- Kingdom: Animalia
- Phylum: Arthropoda
- Subphylum: Chelicerata
- Class: Arachnida
- Order: Opiliones
- Family: Nemastomatidae
- Subfamily: Nemastomatinae
- Genus: Hadzinia; Šilhavý, 1966

Type species
- Hadzinia karamani Hadži, 1940

Diversity
- 2 species

Genus of harvestmen/daddy longlegs

Hazinia is a genus of harvestmen in the family Nemastomatidae with 2 described species from the Balkans.

== Species ==
There are currently 2 described species in the genus Hadzinia:

- Hadzinia ferrani Novak & Kozel, 2014 — Ferranova buža cave, Vrhnika, Slovenia
- Hadzinia karamani (Hadži, 1940) — Bosnia & Herzegovina and Croatia
