= Asiolasma juergengruberi =

Scientific classification
- Domain: Eukaryota
- Kingdom: Animalia
- Phylum: Arthropoda
- Subphylum: Chelicerata
- Class: Arachnida
- Order: Opiliones
- Family: Nemastomatidae
- Genus: Asiolasma
- Species: A. juergengruberi

Binomial name
- Asiolasma juergengruberi Martens, 2019

Species of harvestman/daddy longlegs

Asiolasma juergengruberi is a species of harvestmen belonging to the family Nemastomatidae. It is endemic to northern Yunnan Province China. It was described in the genus Asiolasma.

== Description ==
Asiolasma juergengruberi is a medium-sized globular species, with comparably flattened prosoma and ocular tubercle. The hood has a relatively short hood projection. In the male, the second cheliceral article has a pointed hook on broad elevated apophysis (of variable form). Furthermore, the male penis shaft is extremely slender with a short enlarged base; while the glans/truncus armature proximally contains two dislocated lateral spicules.
