= Asiolasma schwendingeri =

Scientific classification
- Domain: Eukaryota
- Kingdom: Animalia
- Phylum: Arthropoda
- Subphylum: Chelicerata
- Class: Arachnida
- Order: Opiliones
- Family: Nemastomatidae
- Genus: Asiolasma
- Species: A. schwendingeri

Binomial name
- Asiolasma schwendingeri Martens, 2019

Species of harvestman/daddy longlegs

Asiolasma schwendingeri is a species of harvestmen belonging to the family Nemastomatidae. It is found in Vietnam, Ha Noi Province. It was described in the genus Asiolasma.

== Description ==
Asiolasma schwendingeri is said to be the largest and leggiest of the genus. The original description indicates it can be diagnosed by the rather flat body, anterior part of prosoma including eye mound and hood slightly elevated (in lateral view). This can give the visual impression of a massive body, and short hood plus slender and fanned tubercles of hood. Else the species is said to have conspicuously long and slender pedipalps that are only found in this species. The pedipalpal tibia and tarsus are notably together longer than femur (in both sexes).
