= Asiolasma =

Scientific classification
- Kingdom: Animalia
- Phylum: Arthropoda
- Subphylum: Chelicerata
- Class: Arachnida
- Order: Opiliones
- Family: Nemastomatidae
- Subfamily: Ortholasmatinae
- Genus: Asiolasma; Martens, 2019

Diversity
- 6 species

Genus of harvestmen/daddy longlegs

Asiolasma is a genus of harvestmen in the family Nemastomatidae with six described species (as of 2023). The species are found in Southeast Asia, namely China, Vietnam and Thailand. Some species are treated under other genera in Schönhofer (2013).

== Description ==
The genus Asiolasma was described by Jochen Martens, with the nominated type species Dendrolasma angka Schwendinger & Gruber (1992). In the past, this species was alternatively placed in Cladolasma, Another species was later described as Cladolasma damingshan Zhang & Zhang (2013), but both have since been transferred.

== Species ==
These six species belong to the genus Asiolasma:

- Asiolasma ailaoshan (Zhang, Zhao & Zhang, 2018) – China
- Asiolasma angka (Schwendinger & Gruber, 1992) – Thailand
- Asiolasma billsheari Martens, 2019 – China
- Asiolasma damingshan (Zhang & Zhang, 2013) – China
- Asiolasma juergengruberi Martens, 2019 – China
- Asiolasma schwendingeri Martens, 2019 – Vietnam

== Etymology ==
Gender neuter. From toponym Asia + truncation of pre-existing genus name Ortholasma.
