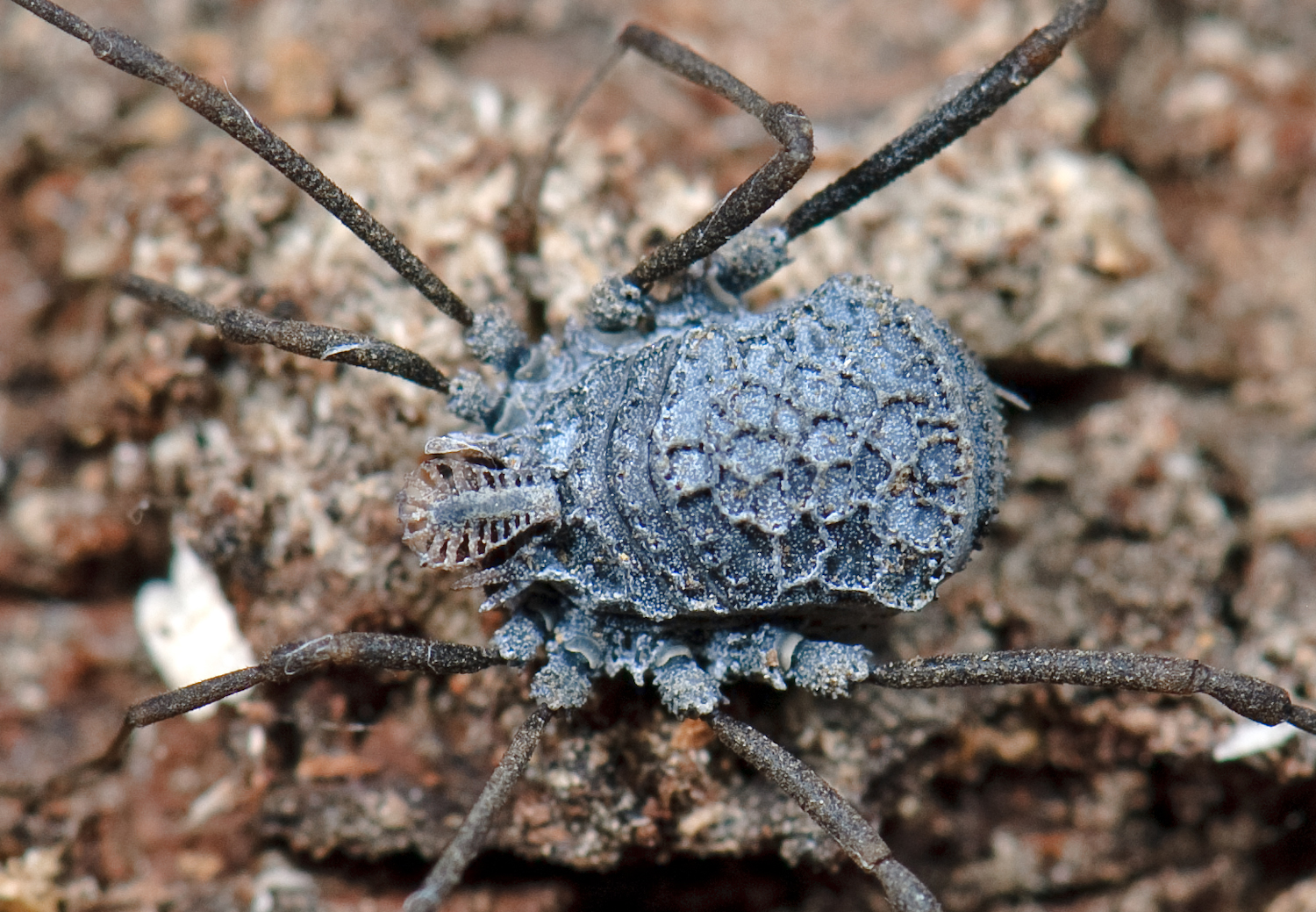
- O. colossus

Scientific classification
- Domain: Eukaryota
- Kingdom: Animalia
- Phylum: Arthropoda
- Subphylum: Chelicerata
- Class: Arachnida
- Order: Opiliones
- Family: Nemastomatidae
- Subfamily: Ortholasmatinae
- Genus: Ortholasma; Banks, 1894

= Ortholasma =

Genus of harvestmen/daddy longlegs

Ortholasma is a genus of harvestmen in the family Nemastomatidae with 5 described species. The genus has been revised by Shear (2010).

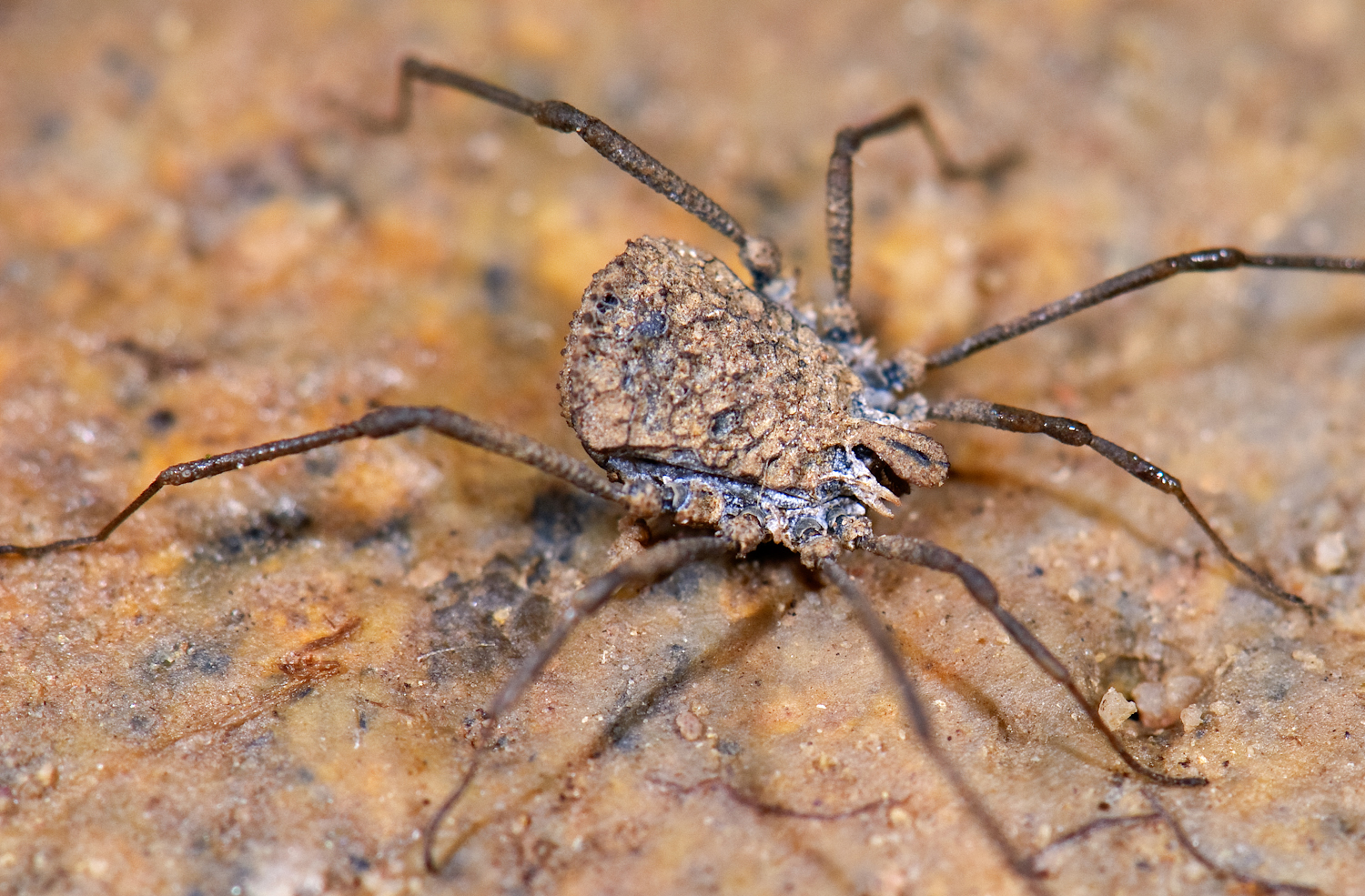
O. rugosum

== Species ==
These 5 species belong to the genus Ortholasma:

- Ortholasma colossus Shear, 2010
- Ortholasma coronadense Cockerell, 1916
- Ortholasma levipes Shear & Gruber, 1983
- Ortholasma pictipes Banks, 1911
- Ortholasma rugosum Banks, 1894
