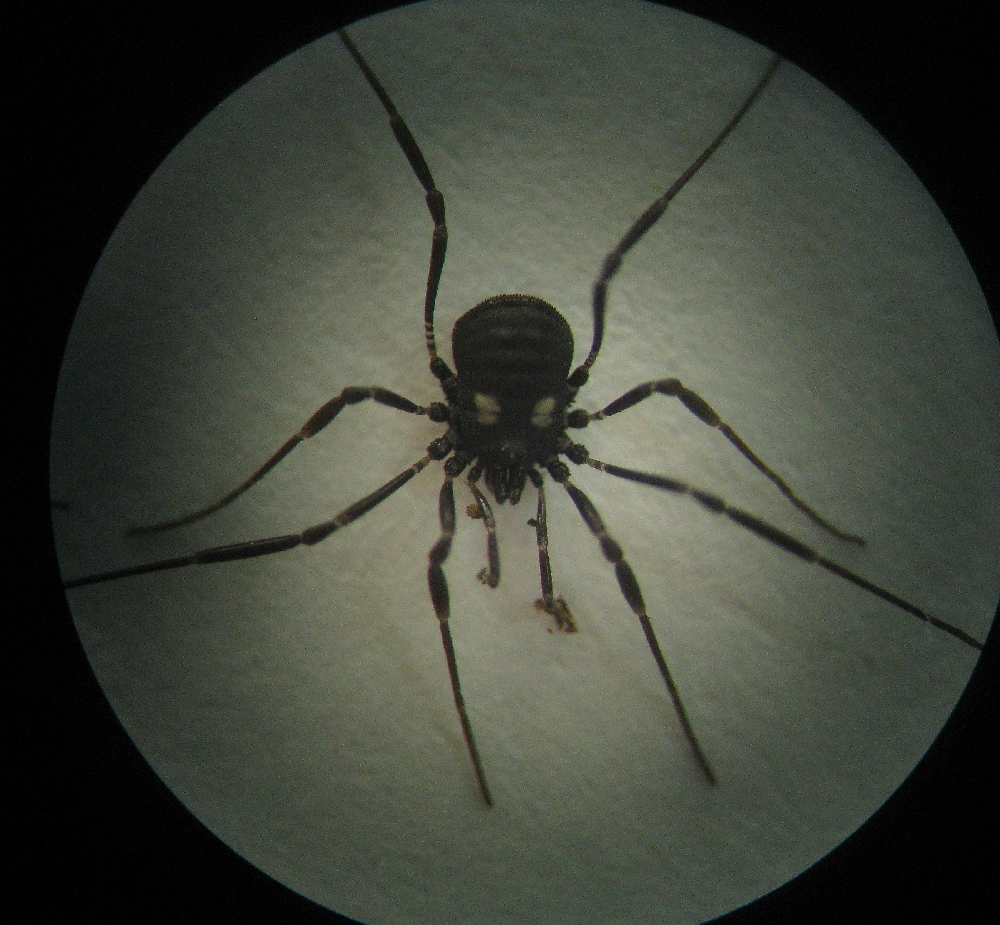
- Nemastoma lugubre

Scientific classification
- Kingdom: Animalia
- Phylum: Arthropoda
- Subphylum: Chelicerata
- Class: Arachnida
- Order: Opiliones
- Suborder: Dyspnoi
- Superfamily: Troguloidea
- Family: Nemastomatidae
- Genus: Nemastoma; Koch, 1836

= Nemastoma (harvestman) =

Species of harvestman/daddy longlegs

Nemastoma is a genus of harvestmen belonging to the family Nemastomatidae.

The species of this genus are found in Europe and Northern America.

Species:

- Nemastoma bidentatum Roewer, 1914
- Nemastoma bimaculatum (Fabricius, 1775)

etc
