= William Shear =

American zoologist

William A. Shear
- Born: 1942 (age 83–84); Pennsylvania
- Education: Harvard University (Ph.D); University of New Mexico (M.S.)
- Known for: Millipede taxonomy
- Scientific career
- Fields: Diplopodology
- Workplaces: Hampden-Sydney College
- Doctoral advisor: Herbert Levi

William Albert Shear (born 1942) is an American arachnologist and myriapodologist who has published more than 200 scientific articles primarily on harvestman and millipede taxonomy. He is Trinkle Professor Emeritus at Hampden-Sydney College, Virginia.

He was born in Coudersport, Pennsylvania, completed his undergraduate work at College of Wooster, masters at the University of New Mexico, and PhD at the Museum of Comparative Zoology at Harvard University under the supervision of Herbert Walter Levi.

While at Harvard, Shear completed a revision of the millipede family Cleidogonidae and reclassification of the order Chordeumatida. He is an expert in Paleozoic arthropods, and has published several papers on fossil millipedes, centipedes, and spiders. A number of species are named after him, including Hypochilus sheari Platnick, 1987 and Brachoria sheari Marek, 2010.

Shear is a lifetime appointee as Senior Scientific Associate at the Virginia Museum of Natural History and is a research associate at the American Museum of Natural History and Museum of Comparative Zoology.

He lives in Farmville, Virginia, and is an avid iris gardener and Godan (fifth degree black belt) in Shōrin-ryū Shōrinkan traditional Okinawan karate.

His zoological author abbreviation is Shear.

== See also ==
- Taxa named by William Shear
