= Cladolasma =

Scientific classification
- Kingdom: Animalia
- Phylum: Arthropoda
- Subphylum: Chelicerata
- Class: Arachnida
- Order: Opiliones
- Family: Nemastomatidae
- Genus: Cladolasma; Suzuki, 1963
- Species: C. parvulum

Binomial name
- Cladolasma parvulum Suzuki, 1963

Genus of harvestmen

Cladolasma is a genus of harvestmen belonging to the family Nemastomatidae. The genus is monotypic containing a single species Cladolasma parvulum. They are endemic to Japan, with records in Ehime and Tokushima Prefectures. The genus was described by Seisho Suzuki, with the type species Cladolasma parvulum Suzuki, 1963, subsequently revised to Dendrolasma parvulum (Suzuki, 1963) in Suzuki (1974), but later restored as a valid genus.

Other species that have been described from China, and Thailand have since been moved into other genera, notably Asiolasma Martens (2019).

== Description ==
The genus Cladolasma differs markedly from Asiolasma in the male genital morphology, with a strongly asymmetric glans penis, later said to have a little developed dorsal network of anvil-shaped tubercles and in a small anterior hood.

== Etymology ==
The genus is neuter. In the original description the species name was published as Cladolasma parvula Suzuki 1963, but the suffix was altered in subsequent publications to Cladolasma parvulum Suzuki 1963 (e.g. per Shear 2010a: 17) adopting mandatory use of the correct inflection of the adjective parvulum for neuter gender.
