= Nemastomoides =

Nemastomoides Temporal range: Carboniferous

Scientific classification
- Kingdom: Animalia
- Phylum: Arthropoda
- Subphylum: Chelicerata
- Class: Arachnida
- Order: Opiliones
- Suborder: Dyspnoi
- Superfamily: Troguloidea
- Family: †Nemastomoididae; Petrunkevitch, 1955
- Genus: †Nemastomoides; Thevenin, 1901

Species
- Nemastomoides elaveris; Nemastomoides longipes

Genus of harvestmen/daddy longlegs

Nemastomoides is an extinct genus of harvestmen known from the Carboniferous fossil record. The genus is the only member of the family Nemastomoididae and contains three described species. Nemastomoides elaveris was found in the Coal Measures of Commentry in northern France, together with Eotrogulus fayoli.

Alexander Petrunkevitch described two fossil harvestmen from Mazon Creek, Illinois, United States, in 1913 in the genus Protopilio, but later synonymized the two with the genus Nemastomoides.

While N. longipes is a harvestman with long legs and a segmented oval body, N. depressus is in reality not a harvestman, but a poorly preserved phalangiotarbid.

While the Nemastomoididae are currently included in the harvestman suborder Dyspnoi, they look more like Eupnoi.

== Species ==
- Nemastomoides elaveris Thevenin, 1901
- Nemastomoides longipes (Petrunkevitch, 1913)

Not a harvestman, but a phalangiotarbid:

- Nemastomoides depressus (Petrunkevitch, 1913)
