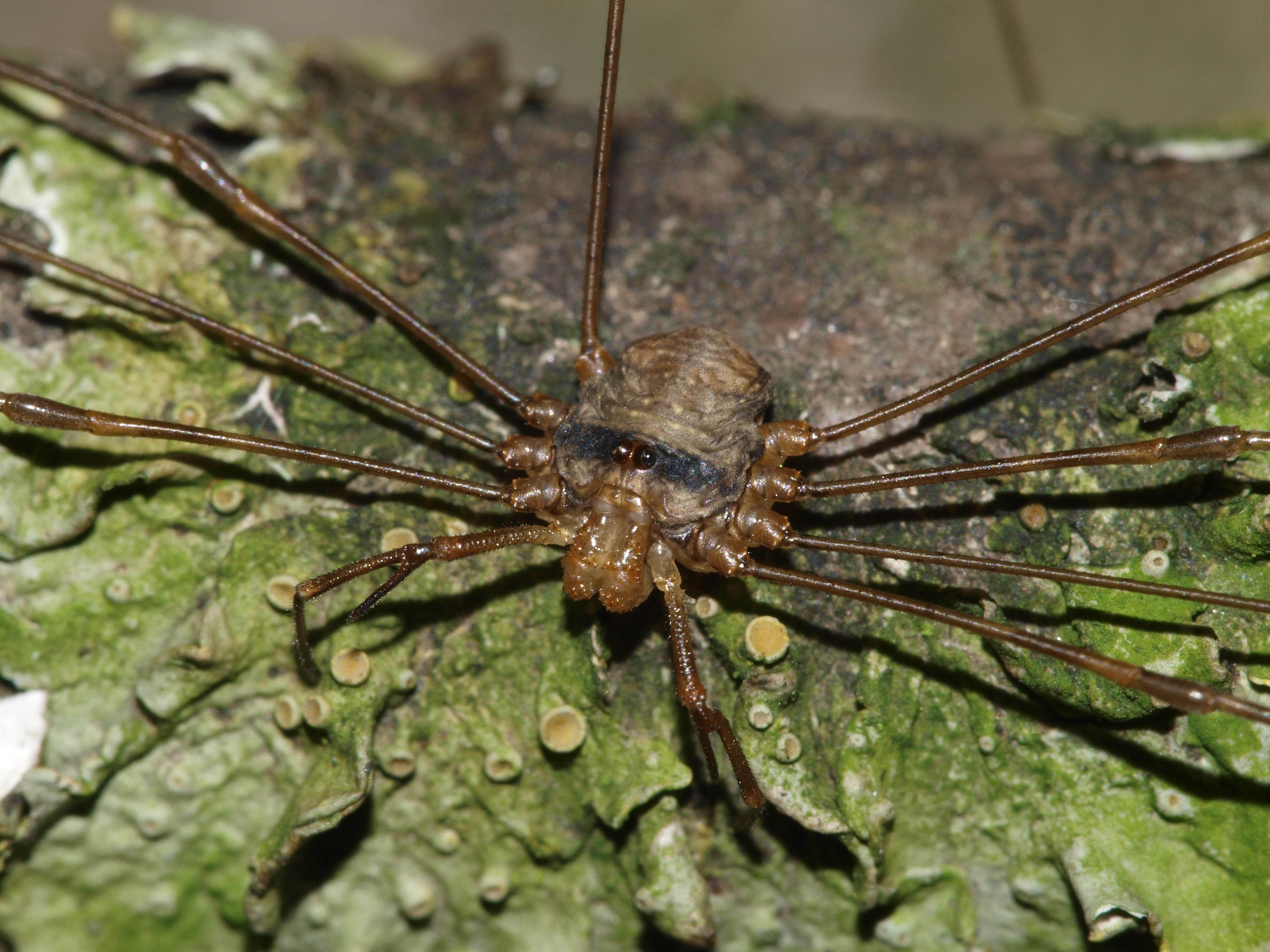

Scientific classification
- Kingdom: Animalia
- Phylum: Arthropoda
- Subphylum: Chelicerata
- Class: Arachnida
- Order: Opiliones
- Family: Phalangiidae
- Genus: Dicranopalpus
- Species: D. ramosus

Binomial name
- Dicranopalpus ramosus (Simon, 1909)

Synonyms
- Dicranochirus ramosus Dicranopalpus caudatus

= Dicranopalpus ramosus =

Species of harvestman/daddy longlegs

Dicranopalpus ramosus is a species of harvestman.

== Description ==
Males are up to 4 mm long, females can reach up to 6 mm. Both sexes have very long legs (especially the second pair can reach up to 5 cm), and the pedipalps have a forked appearance due to a distinct elongated apophysis that reaches almost to the end of the tibia. Their body is brownish with dark markings, the females being lighter colored.

Adults can be found from August to November, mostly in gardens and on outer walls, but sometimes also inside.

The forked pedipalps and the resting posture, with the legs stretched to the sides, makes this species easy to identify, although the traditional method of collecting invertebrates does not prove adequate: of 103 individuals captured in Belgium, only one was found in a pitfall; all others were collected by hand.

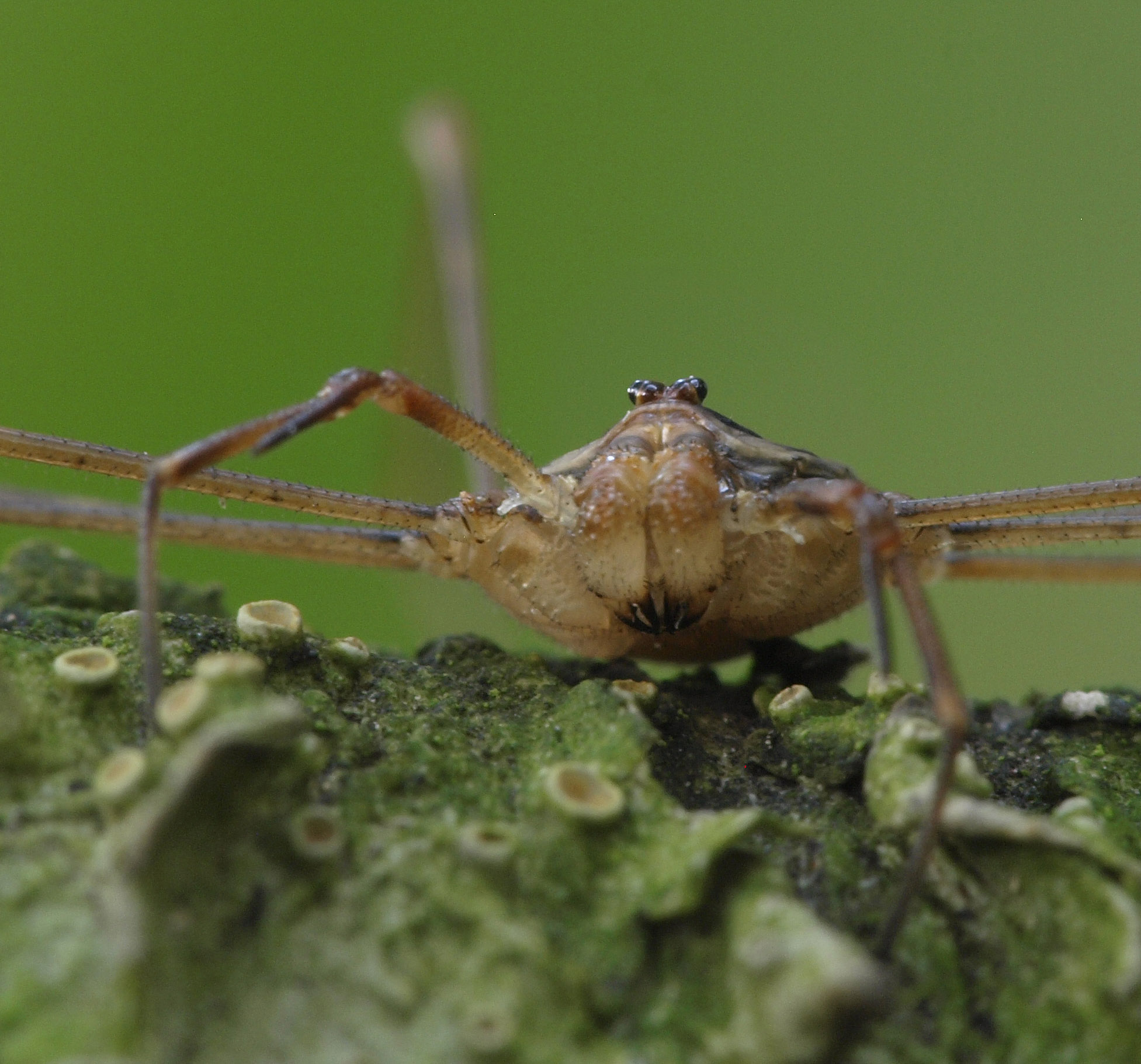
Male

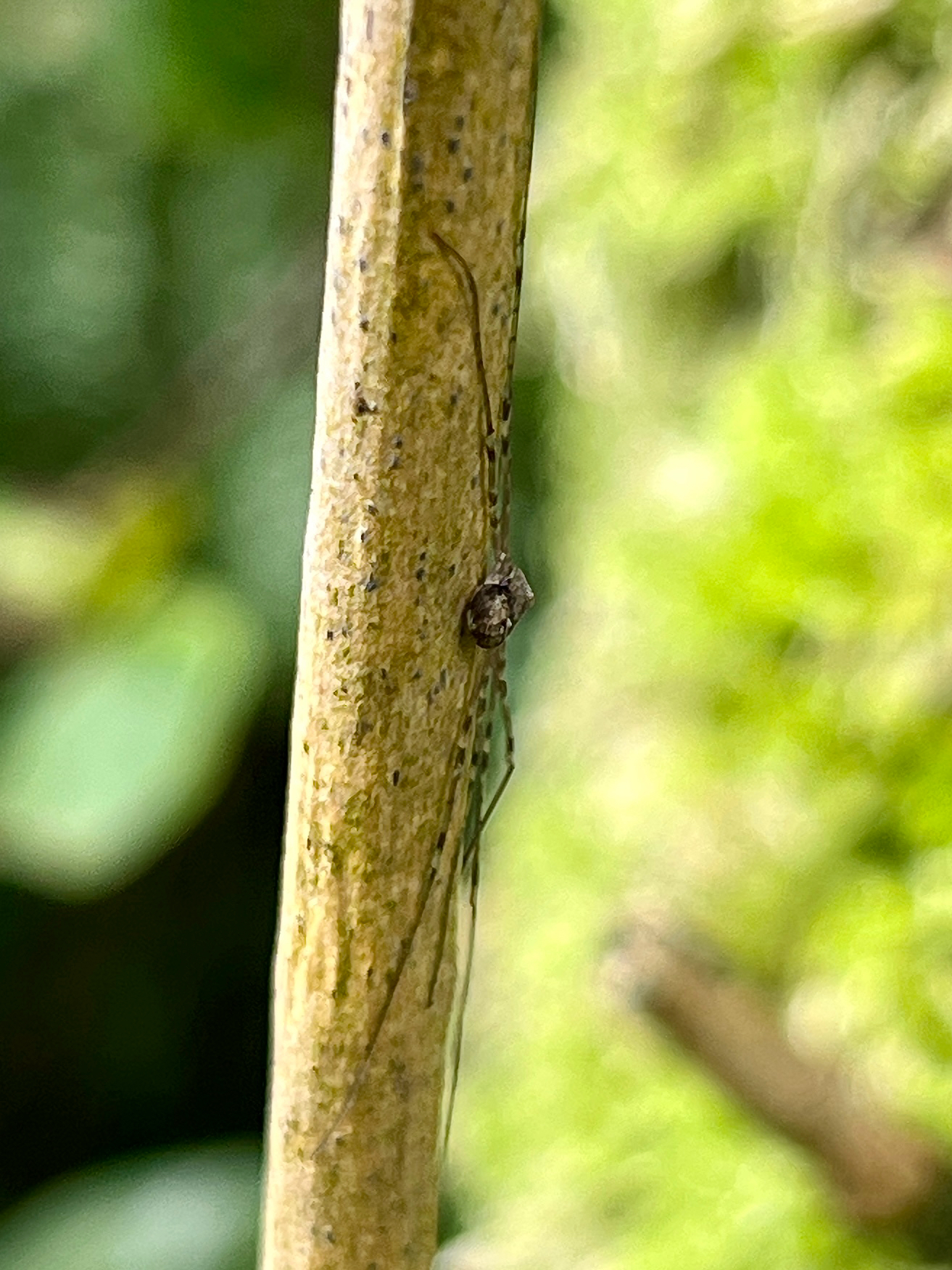
Resting posture

== Distribution ==
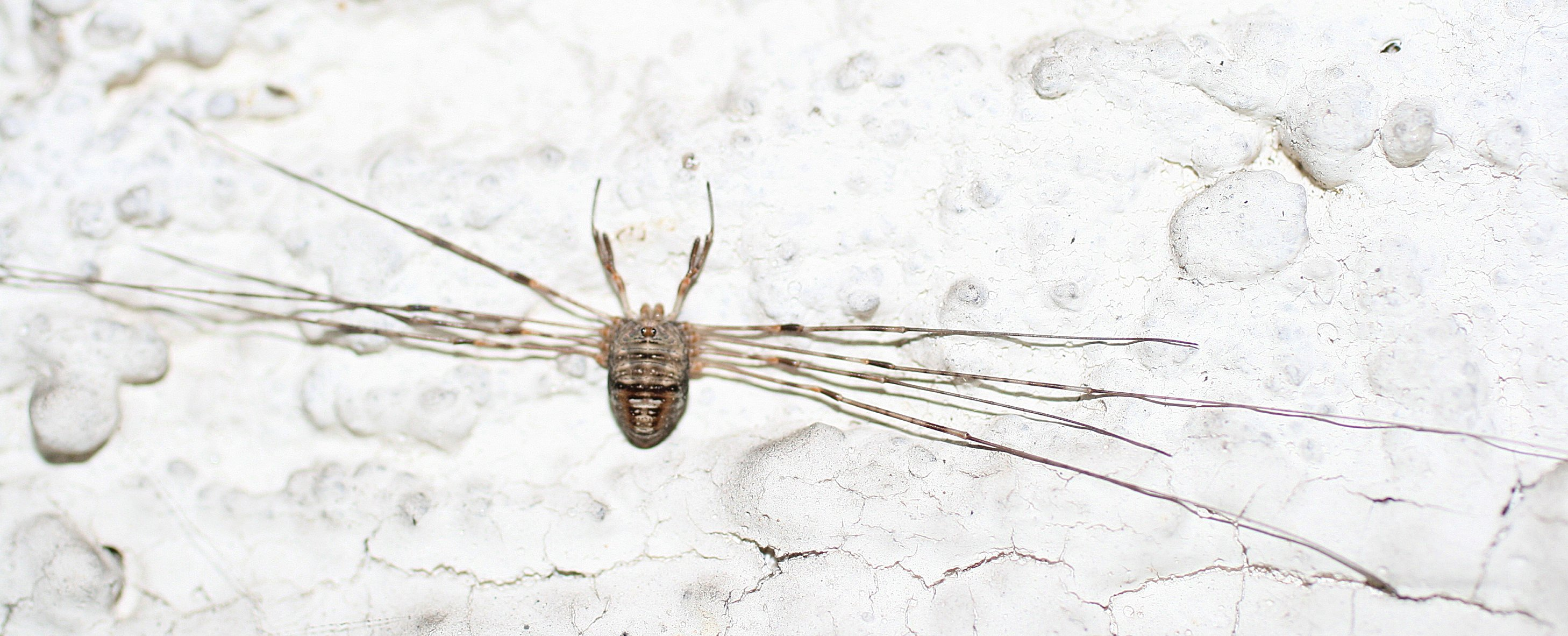
D. ramosus from Leverkusen, Germany

Originally the species was found in Morocco. Later it spread into Europe, with first reports in Portugal (1948), where it spread to Spain (1965) and France (1969). The Netherlands were reached in 1992. Since 2004 it has been known to occur in Germany. As early as 1957, it was reported in Bournemouth, southern England, from where it spread all over Great Britain, reaching Scotland in 2000. From 2010, it has been established in most of Denmark, and from 2012 southern Sweden. In 2019, an individual photographed by iNaturalist user "kiwikiu" at Cannon Beach, Oregon, suggested the species' introduction into the United States. Since then, the species has been documented several times in the area.

The very similar and closely related D. gasteinensis is found in the Alps.
