= Eotrogulus =

Eotrogulus Temporal range: Carboniferous

Scientific classification
- Kingdom: Animalia
- Phylum: Arthropoda
- Subphylum: Chelicerata
- Class: Arachnida
- Order: Opiliones
- Suborder: Dyspnoi
- Superfamily: Troguloidea
- Family: †Eotrogulidae; Petrunkevitch, 1955
- Genus: †Eotrogulus; Thevenin, 1901
- Species: †E. fayoli

Binomial name
- †Eotrogulus fayoli Thevenin, 1901

Genus of harvestmen/daddy longlegs

Eotrogulus is an extinct genus of harvestmen known from the Carboniferous fossil record. The genus is the only member of the family Eotrogulidae and contains one species Eotrogulus fayoli. Eotrogulus was found in the Coal Measures of Commentry in northern France, together with Nemastomoides elaveris. Eotrogulus was previously thought to be a trigonotarbid.
