= Arthropod mouthparts =

Mouthparts of arthropods

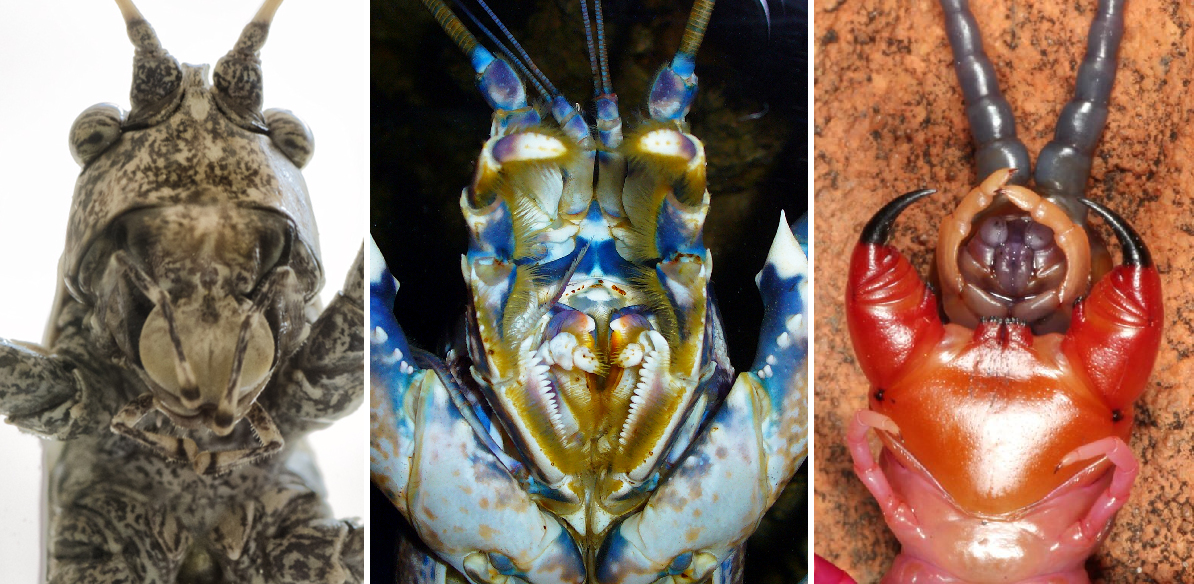
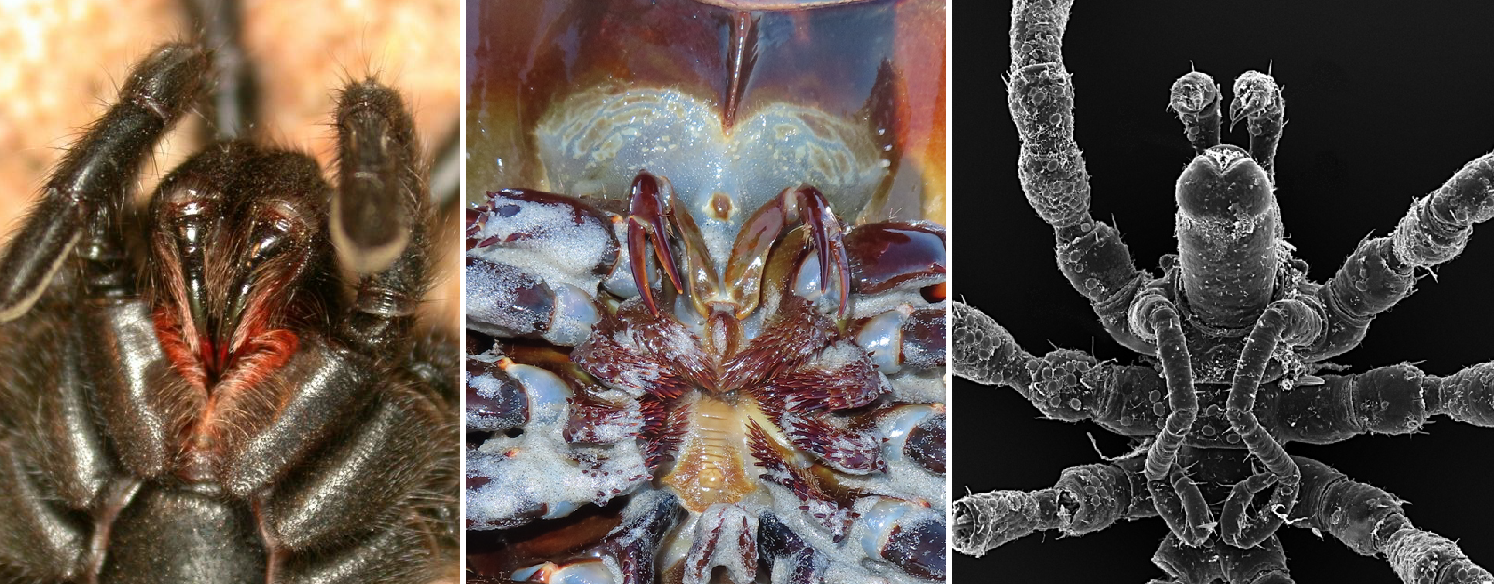
Mouthparts of Mandibulata (top) and Chelicerata (bottom)

The mouthparts of arthropods have evolved into a number of forms, each adapted to a different style or mode of feeding. Most mouthparts are modified pairs of appendages, which in ancestral forms would have appeared more like legs than mouthparts, being less-specialized or "primitive". In general, arthropods have mouthparts for cutting, chewing, piercing, sucking, shredding, siphoning, and filtering.

This article outlines the basic elements of four arthropod-groups: Insects, myriapods, crustaceans, and chelicerates. Insects are used as the model, with the novel mouthparts of the other groups introduced. Insects are not the ancestral form of the other arthropods discussed here; they are not the basalmost arthropods. In different types of arthropods, jointed appendages around the mouth are modified in different ways and form mouth parts.

== Insects ==
Insect mouthparts exhibit a range of forms. The earliest insects had chewing mouthparts. Specialisation includes mouthparts modified for siphoning, piercing, sucking and sponging. These modifications have evolved a number of times. For example, mosquitoes and aphids both pierce and suck. Female mosquitoes feed on animal blood, whereas aphids feed on plant fluids. This section provides an overview of the individual mouthparts of chewing insects. The diversification of insects' food sources led to the evolution of their mouthparts. This process was facilitated by natural selection.

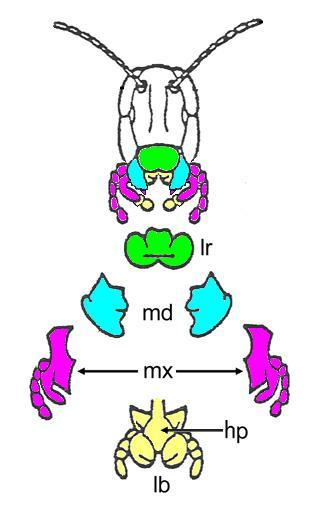
The chewing mouthparts of a grasshopper. Legend: lr, labrum; md, mandibles; mx, maxillae; hp hypopharynx; lb, labium.

=== Labrum ===
The labrum is a flat extension of the head (below the clypeus), covering the mandibles. Unlike other mouthparts, the labrum is a single, fused plate (though it originally was—and embryonically is—two structures). It is the upper-most of the mouthparts and located on the midline. It serves to hold food in place during chewing by the mandibles and thus can simply be described as an upper lip.

=== Mandible ===
Chewing insects have two mandibles, one on each side of the head. They are typically the largest mouthpart of chewing insects, being used to masticate (cut, shred, tear, crush, chew) food items. They open outwards (to the sides of the head) and come together medially.

=== Maxilla ===
Paired maxillae cut food and manipulate it during mastication. Maxillae can have hairs and "teeth" along their inner margins. At the outer margin, the galea is a cupped or scoop-like structure, which sits over the outer edge of the labium. They also have palps, which are used to sense the characteristics of potential foods.

=== Labium ===
The labium is a single structure, although it is formed from two fused secondary maxillae. It can be described as the floor of the mouth and functioning in close the mouth of the insect. With the maxillae, it assists manipulation of food during mastication.

=== Hypopharynx ===
The hypopharynx is a somewhat globular structure, arising from the base of the labium. It assists swallowing. It performs the role of the tongue found in large vertebrates.

== Myriapods ==
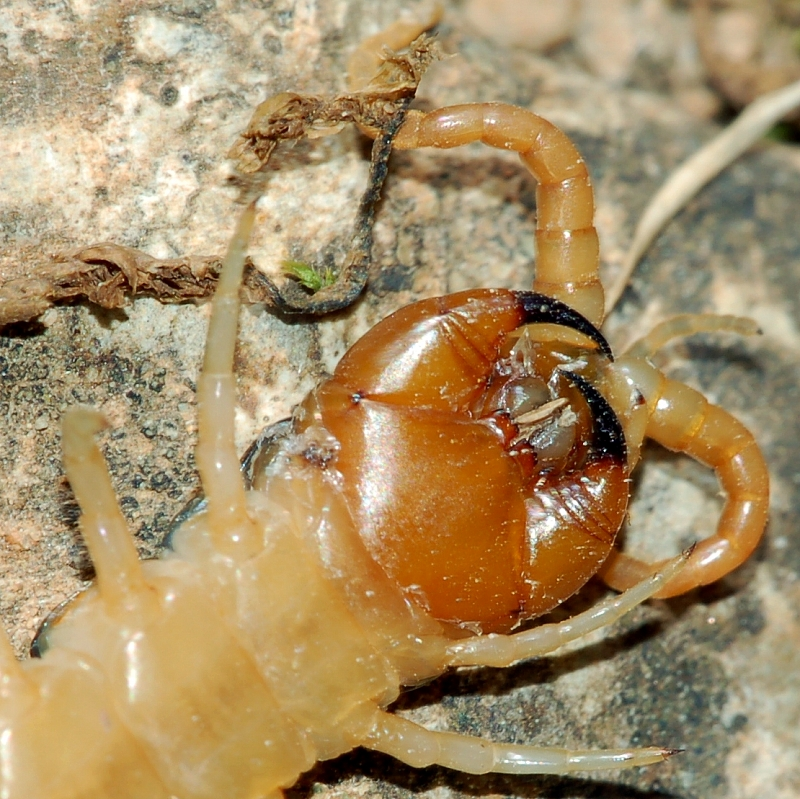
A ventral view of the forcipules of a centipede, arising from the first body segment

Myriapods comprise four classes of arthropod, each with a similar morphology: Class Chilopoda (centipedes); class Diplopoda (millipedes); class Pauropoda; and class Symphyla. Myriapod mouthparts are similar to those of chewing insects, although there is some variation between the myriapod classes. A labrum is present but sometimes is not obvious and forms an upper lip, often in association with an epistome. The labium is formed by first maxillae in diplopoda forming the gnathochilarium. The preoral cavity so-formed contains paired mandibles and any maxillae which are present.

=== Forcipules ===
Centipedes, in addition to their mouthparts, possess a pair of "poison claws", or forcipules. These, like the maxillipeds of crustaceans, are modified legs and not true mouthparts. The forcipules arise from the first body segment, curving forward and to the midline. The tip is a pointed fang, which has an opening from a venom gland. The forcipules are used to capture and envenomate prey.

== Crustaceans ==
Crustaceans comprise a number of classes, with various feeding modes supported by a range of adaptations to the mouthparts. In general, however, crustaceans possess paired mandibles with opposing biting and grinding surfaces. The mandibles are followed by paired first and second maxillae. Both the mandibles and the maxillae have been variously modified in different crustacean groups for filter feeding with the use of setae.

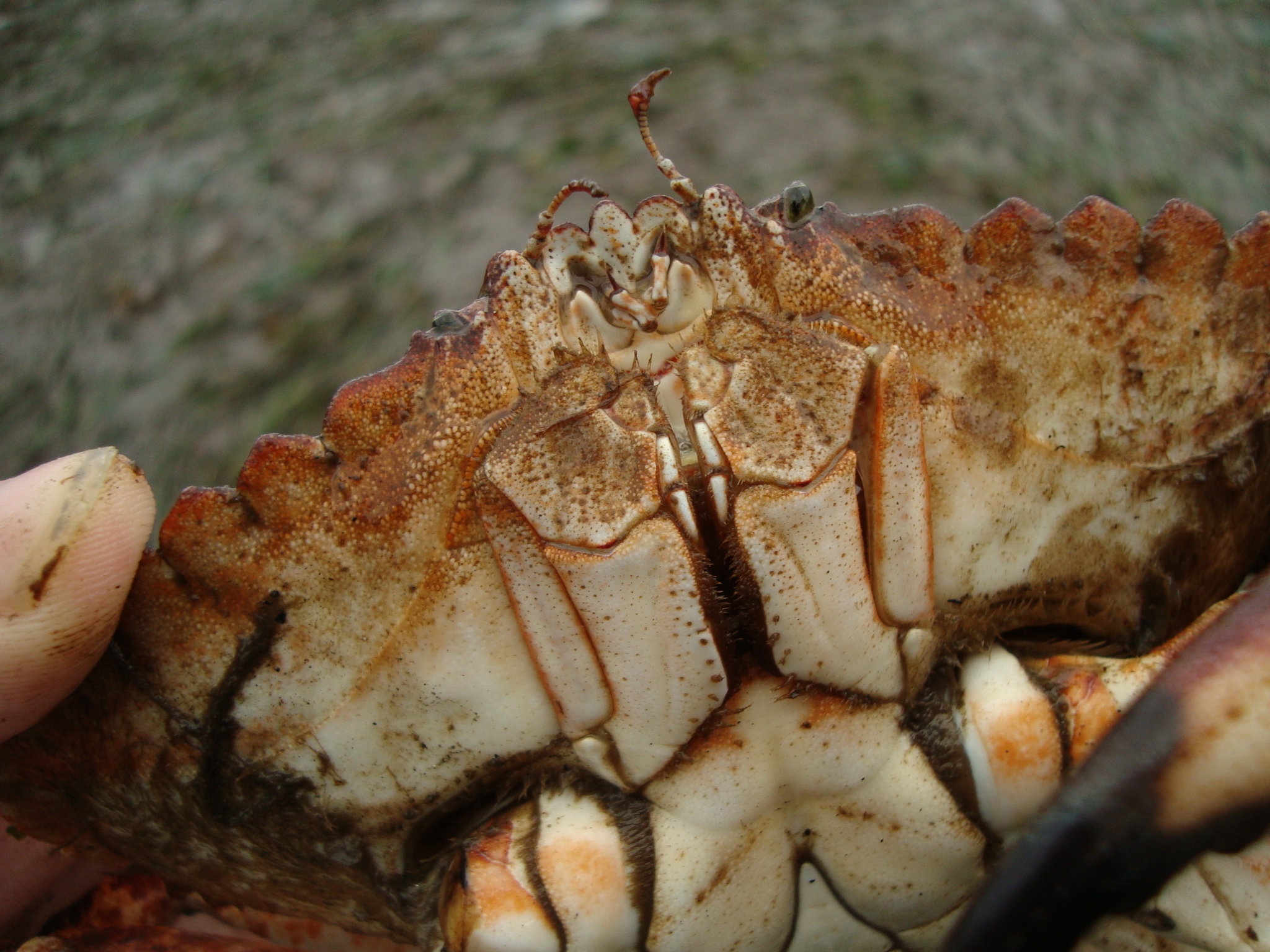
The mouthparts of an edible crab: The third maxillipeds conceal the remaining mouthparts

=== Maxillipeds ===
Up to three pairs of legs are modified to maxillipeds, which assist manipulation of food items by passing food forward to either the mandibles for chewing or to the maxillae for cutting into smaller pieces. The somite of the maxillipeds may be fused to the cephalon. In some animals, predominantly amphipods but also some isopods such as Gnathiids, these legs are referred to as the gnathopods or gnathopodites; these differ from maxillipeds by either being prehensile, subchelate, or chelate.

=== Setae ===
Filter feeding crustaceans have setae on modified appendages that act as filters. Filter feeding may have developed in association with swimming, with early morphological adaptations occurring on the appendages of the body trunk. Subsequent adaptations appear to have favored forward filtering appendages. Filtering appendages generate water currents that bring food items into reach for collection by setae. Other setae may be used to brush the filtering setae clean, and yet other setae may transport food items to the mouth.

=== Cirri ===
Barnacles have thoracic appendages modified for feeding, the cirri, which filter suspended food particles from water currents and pass the food to the mouth.

== Chelicerates ==
Chelicerates comprise four classes of arthropod, with similar gross morphology but defining differences: Class Xiphosura (horseshoe crabs); class Eurypterida (the extinct eurypterids); class Arachnida (spiders, scorpions, ticks and mites); and class Pycnogonida (sea spiders).

Chelicerates are in part defined by possessing chelicerate appendages. Crustaceans also possess chelate appendages. Chelicerates are more easily distinguished from other arthropods in lacking antennae and mandibles.

Types of chelicerae: (A) jackknife, (B) scissor, and (C) 3-segmented chelate

=== Chelicerae ===
Chelicerae are chelate appendages that are used to grasp food. For example, in horseshoe crabs, they are like pincers. In spiders, they are hollow and contain, or are connected to, venom glands and are used to inject venom to disable prey prior to feeding. In some spiders, the chelicerae have teeth, which are used to macerate prey items to assist digestion by secreted enzymes. Those spiders without toothed chelicerae inject digestive enzymes directly into their prey.

Mites and ticks have a range of chelicerae. Carnivores have chelicerae that tear and crush prey. Herbivores can have chelicerae that are modified for piercing and sucking, as do parasitic species. In sea spiders, the chelicerae, also known as chelifores, are short and chelate and are positioned on either side of the base of the proboscis or sometimes vestigial or absent.

=== Stomotheca ===
Stomothecae (sing. stomotheca) (Note: Derived from Ancient Greek stoma "mouth" and theca "case, box".) is the term applied to the feeding apparatus in front of the mouth of harvestmen, and sometimes the related scorpions. Usually it consists of the epistome (labrum), two pairs of coxapophyses (endites, maxillary lobes) and often a labium.

The epistome is a projection that forms the anterior wall of the stomotheca. Its upper side is hardened and divided by a transverse invagination (sulcus). The part nearer the groove is sometimes called clypeus, the other one labrum. The area around the mouth is soft and flexible, often with a distal lobe. On the sides, the walls around the mouth are fused to the medial surfaces of the pedipalpal coxae, and a transverse muscle attaches to the inner surfaces of the epistomal walls.

Coxapophyses are extensions from the pedipalps and first pair of legs. While hardened at the base, they end in large soft pads that work as "lips". It some species there is a narrow canal (pseudotrachea) on the posterior surface of the pedipalpal coxapophysis, possibly conducting fluids into the digestive tract. Salivary glands lead into the preoral chamber from both pairs of coxapophyses.

While most harvestmen have coxapophyses on the second pair of legs as well, these do not end in pad-like structures and are reduced in many groups. Where they are fully developed, they probably aid in food intake. Similar lobular structures are sometimes found on the two latter pairs of legs as well, but their function is unknown.

The labium, when present, is a flattened plate derived from the somite of the first walking leg. While large in many Eupnoi and Dyspnoi, it is small in most Laniatores and absent in Cyphophthalmi.

=== Proboscis ===
Sea spiders possess a tubular proboscis forward from the body trunk, at the end of which is the opening to the mouth. In those species that lack chelifores and palps, the proboscis is well developed and more mobile and flexible. In such cases, it can be equipped with sensory bristles and strong rasping ridges around the mouth.

== See also ==
- Gnathobase spined base of appendages used for processing of food in arthropods
