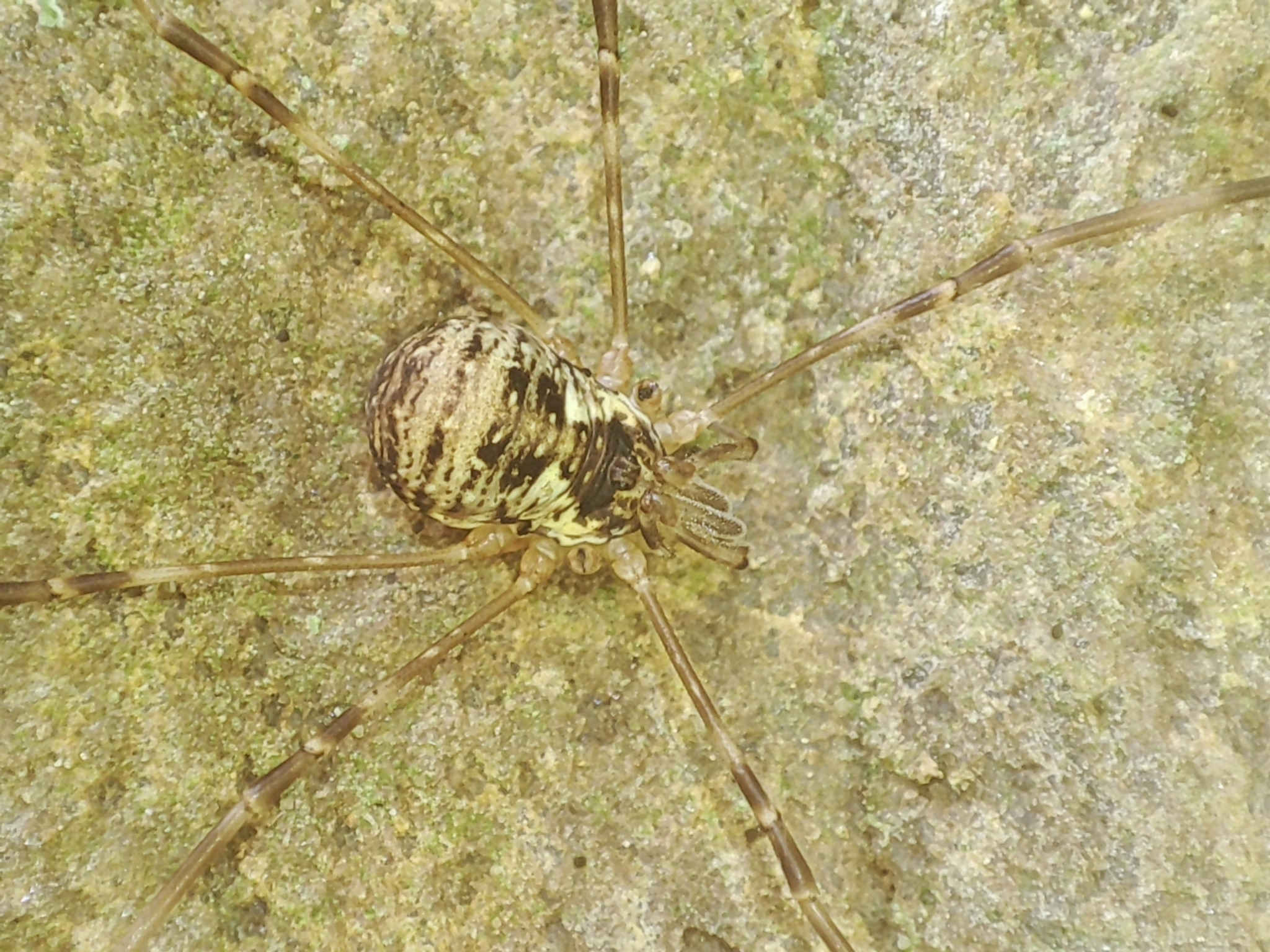

Scientific classification
- Domain: Eukaryota
- Kingdom: Animalia
- Phylum: Arthropoda
- Subphylum: Chelicerata
- Class: Arachnida
- Order: Opiliones
- Family: Phalangiidae
- Genus: Dicranopalpus
- Species: D. fraternus

Binomial name
- Dicranopalpus fraternus Szalay, 1950

= Dicranopalpus fraternus =

Species of arachnid

Dicranopalpus fraternus is a species from the genus Dicranopalpus. The species was originally described by Szalay in 1950.
