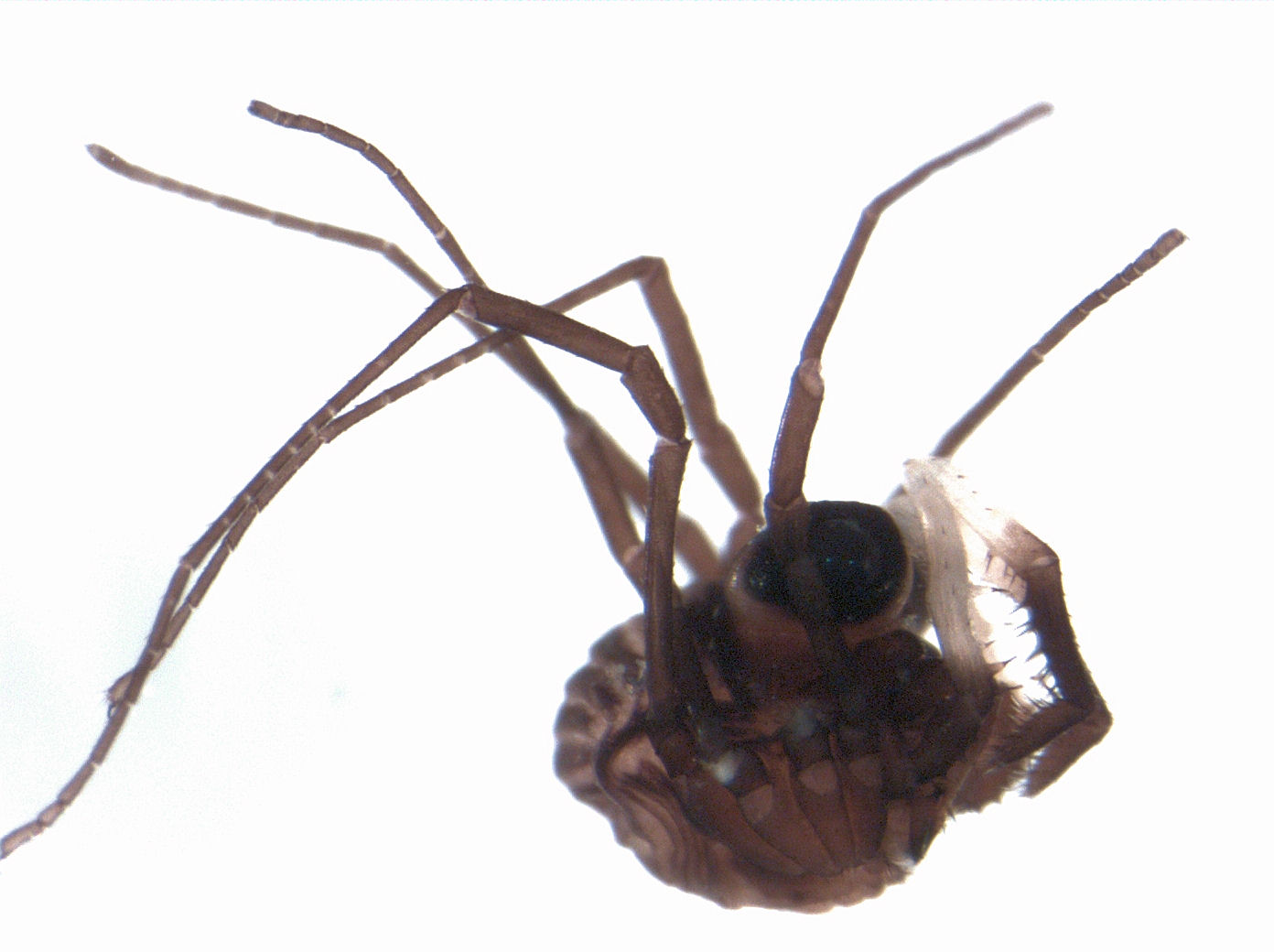
- Acropsopilio neozealandiae

Scientific classification
- Kingdom: Animalia
- Phylum: Arthropoda
- Subphylum: Chelicerata
- Class: Arachnida
- Order: Opiliones
- Suborder: Dyspnoi
- Superfamily: Acropsopilionoidea
- Family: Acropsopilionidae; Roewer, 1924

Type species
- Acropsopilio chilensis Silvestri, 1904

Diversity
- 3 genera, 19 species

= Acropsopilionidae =

Family of harvestmen/daddy longlegs

Acropsopilionidae is a family of harvestmen with 19 described species in three genera.

== Species ==
- Acropsopilio Silvestri, 1904 (Americas [various], Australasia)

- Acropsopilio australicus Cantrell, 1980 – Australia (Queensland)
- Acropsopilio boopis (Crosby, 1904) – USA, Canada (Eastern States and Provinces)
- Acropsopilio chilensis Silvestri, 1904 – Chile, Argentina
- Acropsopilio chomulae (Goodnight and Goodnight, 1948) – Mexico
- Acropsopilio neozealandiae (Forster, 1948) – New Zealand
- Acropsopilio venezuelensis González-Sponga, 1992 – (Venezuela)

- Austropsopilio Forster, 1955 (Eastern Australia, Tasmania, also Chile)

- Austropsopilio altus Cantrell, 1980 – Australia (New South Wales)
- Austropsopilio cygneus Hickman, 1957 – Australia (Tasmania)
- Austropsopilio fuscus (Hickman, 1957) – Australia (Tasmania)
- Austropsopilio inermis Cantrell, 1980 – Australia (New South Wales)
- Austropsopilio megalops (Hickman, 1957) – Australia (Tasmania)
- Austropsopilio novaehollandiae Forster, 1955 – Australia (Queensland, New South Wales)
- Austropsopilio sudamericanus Shultz and Cekalovic, 2003 – Chile

- Cadella Hirst, 1925 (South Africa)

- Cadella africana (Lawrence, 1931) – South Africa
- Cadella capensis Hirst, 1925 – South Africa
- Cadella croeseri Staręga, 1988 – South Africa
- Cadella haddadi Lotz, 2011 – South Africa
- Cadella jocquei Staręga, 2008 – South Africa
- Cadella spatulipis Lawrence, 1934 – South Africa
  - Cadella spatulipis caledonica Lawrence, 1934 – South Africa
  - Cadella spatulipis spatulipis Lawrence, 1934 – South Africa
