= Troguloidea =

Scientific classification
- Domain: Eukaryota
- Kingdom: Animalia
- Phylum: Arthropoda
- Subphylum: Chelicerata
- Class: Arachnida
- Order: Opiliones
- Suborder: Dyspnoi
- Superfamily: Troguloidea; Sundevall, 1833

Families
- Dicranolasmatidae Simon, 1879; Nemastomatidae Simon, 1872; Nipponopsalididae Martens, 1976; Trogulidae Sundevall, 1833; †Eotrogulidae Petrunkevitch, 1955; †Nemastomoididae Petrunkevitch, 1955

Diversity
- 4 families, several genera

Family of harvestmen/daddy longlegs

Troguloidea is a superfamily of harvestmen with 4 genera (2 extinct), found mostly in Europe, Asia, and North America (as of 2023).

== Description ==
The superfamily Troguloidea was described by Sundevall, with the type genus as Trogulus Latreille, 1802 by original implicit etymological designation.

== Taxonomy ==
Troguloidea contains the following families, per World Catalog of Opiliones. Of the 6 genera (as of 2023), 2 of those are extinct. The scheme below largely reflects Schönhofer (2013).

- Dicranolasmatidae Simon, 1879
- Nemastomatidae Simon, 1872
- Nipponopsalididae Martens, 1976
- Trogulidae Sundevall, 1833
- †Eotrogulidae Petrunkevitch, 1955
- †Nemastomoididae Petrunkevitch, 1955
