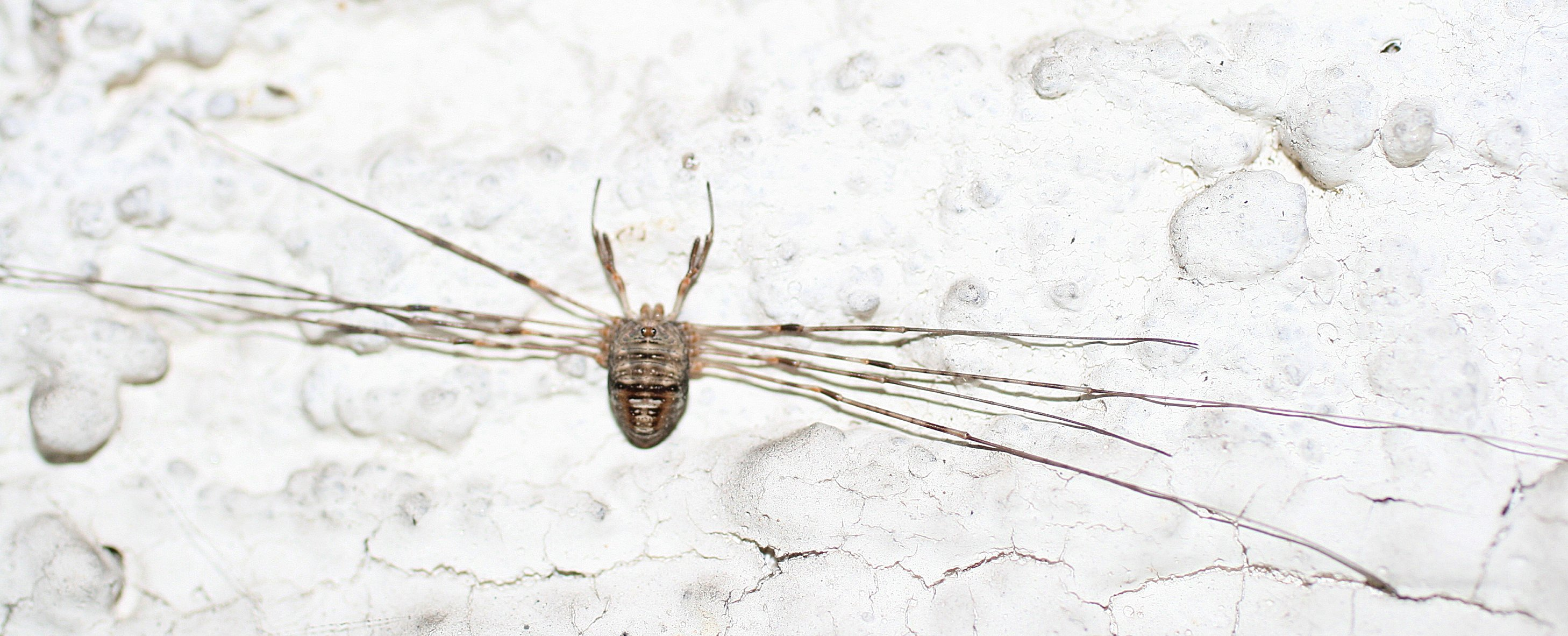
- Dicranopalpus ramosus

Scientific classification
- Domain: Eukaryota
- Kingdom: Animalia
- Phylum: Arthropoda
- Subphylum: Chelicerata
- Class: Arachnida
- Order: Opiliones
- Family: Phalangiidae
- Genus: Dicranopalpus; Doleschall, 1852

Type species
- Dicranopalpus gasteinensis Doleschall, 1852

Diversity
- 13 species

Synonyms
- Dichranochirus; Egaenasser; Fagea; Liodes; Prosalpia

= Dicranopalpus =

Dicranopalpus Temporal range: Palaeogene–present

Genus of harvestmen/daddy longlegs

Dicranopalpus is a genus of harvestmen with twelve known recent species. Three fossil species have been described, all from Baltic amber, but only D. ramiger is currently considered valid.

== Name ==
The genus name refers to the peculiar form of the palps in at least the first described species, D. gasteinensis (and D. ramosus), derived from di "two", cranium "head", and palpus.

== Species ==
- Dicranopalpus angolensis (Lawrence, 1951)
- Dicranopalpus bolivari (Dresco, 1949) (Venezuela)
- Dicranopalpus brevipes (I. Marcellino, 1974)
- Dicranopalpus caudatus (Dresco, 1948)
- Dicranopalpus cantabricus (Dresco, 1953)
- Dicranopalpus dispar (M. Rambla, 1967)
- Dicranopalpus fraternus (Szalay, 1950)
- Dicranopalpus gasteinensis (Doleschal, 1852) (Alps)
- Dicranopalpus insignipalpis (Simon, 1879) (Corsica)
- Dicranopalpus larvatus (Canestrini, 1874) (Italy)
- Dicranopalpus martini (Simon, 1878) (Portugal)
- Dicranopalpus pyrenaeus (Dresco, 1948) (France)
- Dicranopalpus pulchellus (Rambla, 1960)
- † Dicranopalpus ramiger (Koch & Berendt, 1854) (Baltic and Bitterfeld amber fossil)
  - = † Dicranopalpus corniger (Menge, 1854) (Baltic amber)
  - = † Dicranopalpus palmnickensis (Roewer, 1939) (Baltic amber)
- Dicranopalpus ramosus (Simon, 1909) (Western Europe)
