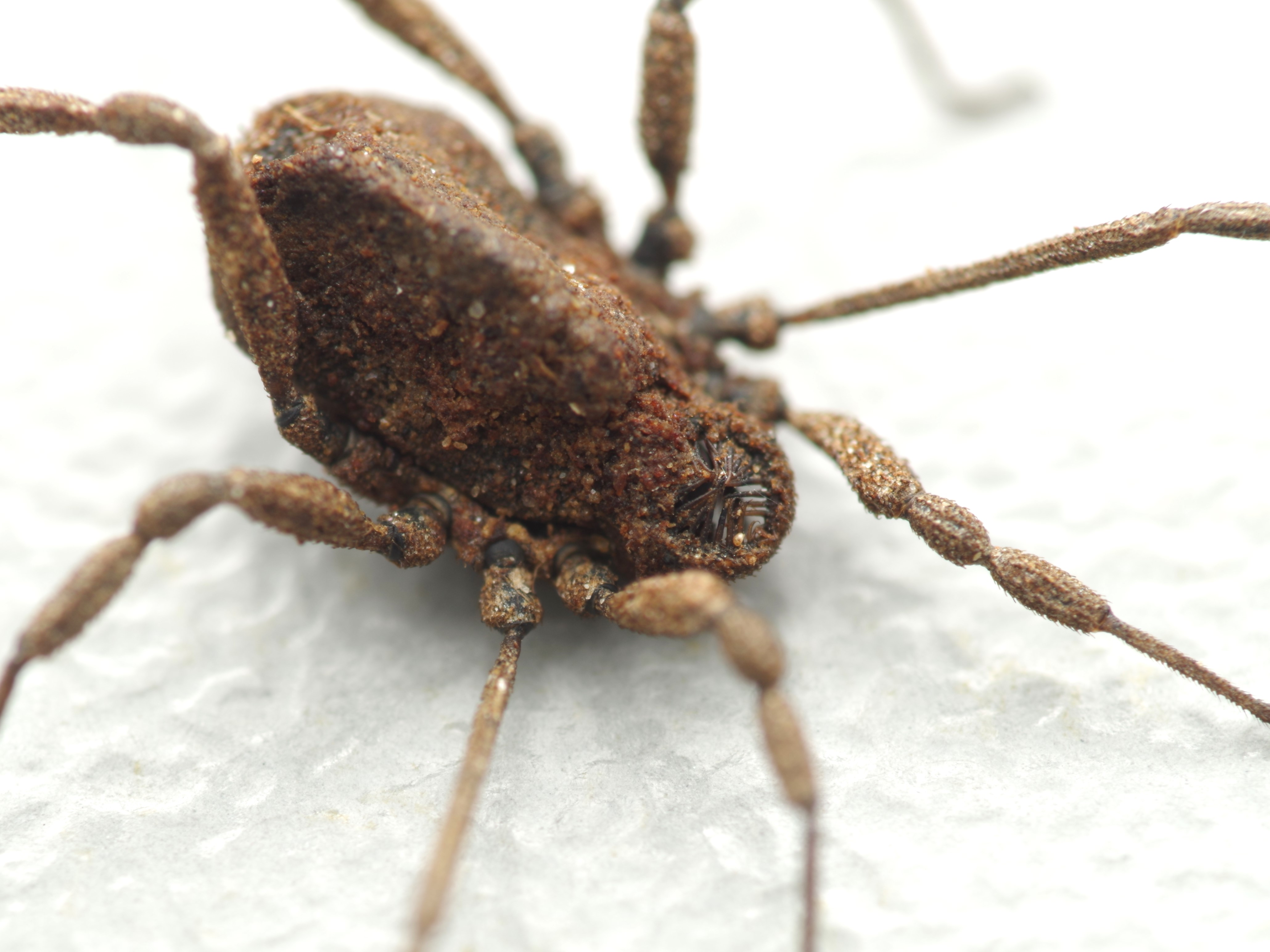
- Dicranolasma soerensenii

Scientific classification
- Kingdom: Animalia
- Phylum: Arthropoda
- Subphylum: Chelicerata
- Class: Arachnida
- Order: Opiliones
- Suborder: Dyspnoi
- Superfamily: Troguloidea
- Family: Dicranolasmatidae; Simon, 1879
- Genus: Dicranolasma; Sørensen, 1873

Type species
- Opilio scaber Herbst, 1799

Diversity
- 1 genus, 16 species

Synonyms
- Amopaum Sørensen 1873:517; Dicranalasma (non-valid unattributed misspelling listed in Hallan 2000, online only)

= Dicranolasma =

Family of harvestmen/daddy longlegs

The Dicranolasmatidae are a monotypic family of harvestmen with 16 described species in a single genus, Dicranolasma.

== Description ==
Species of Dicranolasma range in body length from three to 6.4 mm. Most parts of the body are encrusted with soil particles. The anterior region features a large headlike "hood" with the eyes in center, which consists of two curved processes. The chelicerae and pedipalps are both hidden under the hood in adults and about half as long as the body. The legs are short. Immature forms are quite different from adults. The immature form of D. opilionoides was even described as a different genus (Amopaum). The hood develops only gradually, so in young Dicranolasma the relatively longer pedipalps are carried outside the hood.

== Distribution ==
Dicranolasmatidae occur mainly in the Mediterranean region northward to the southern Alps, the Carpathians, eastward to the Caucasus and Iraq, the Levant and southward to western North Africa.

== Relationships ==
The Dicranolasmatidae are closely related to the Trogulidae and Nemastomatidae, with Trogulus probably sister to Dicranolasma.

The genus consists of five species groups:

- D. scabrum group — Aegean Islands, Turkey, Caucasia, Middle East
  - D. scabrum, D. opilionoides, D. hoberlandti, D. giljarovi, D. kurdistanum, D. thracium, D. ressli, D. ponticum, D. cretaeum.
- D. mladeni group
- D. cristatum group
- D. soerensenii group
- D. apuanum group

== Etymology ==
The genus name Dicranolasma is a combination of Ancient Greek di "two", kranion "head", and elasma "plate", referring to the distinctive bifurcated hood of the genus.

== Species ==
The 16 recognised species of Dicranolasma, along with their type localities:

- Dicranolasma apuanum Marcellino, 1970 - Italy
- Dicranolasma cretaeum Gruber, 1998 - Crete
- Dicranolasma cristatum Thorell, 1876 - Italy
- Dicranolasma giljarovi Silhavý, 1966 - Russia
- Dicranolasma hirtum Loman, 1894 - Italy
- Dicranolasma hoberlandti Silhavý, 1956 - Turkey
- Dicranolasma kurdistanum Starega, 1970 - Iraq
- Dicranolasma mladeni Karaman, 1990 - Montenegro
- Dicranolasma opilionoides (L. Koch, 1867) - Greece
- Dicranolasma pauper Dahl, 1903 - Italy
- Dicranolasma ponticum Gruber, 1998 - Turkey
- Dicranolasma ressli Gruber, 1998 - Turkey
- Dicranolasma scabrum (Herbst, 1799) - Romania
- Dicranolasma soerensenii Thorell, 1876 - France
- Dicranolasma thracium Starega, 1976 - Bulgaria
- Dicranolasma verhoeffi Dahl, 1903 - Bosnia and Herzegovina
