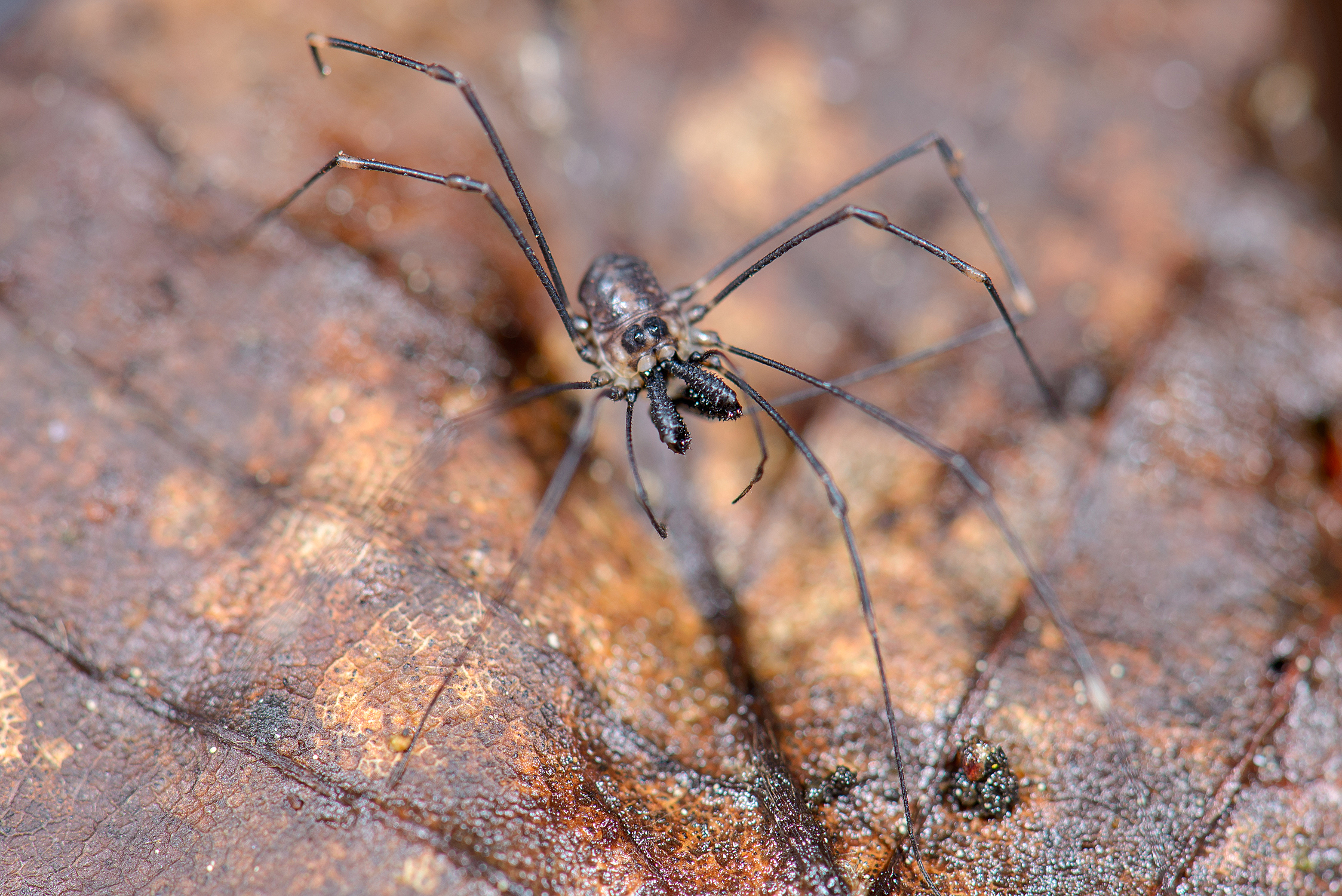
- Nipponopsalis yezoensis

Scientific classification
- Kingdom: Animalia
- Phylum: Arthropoda
- Subphylum: Chelicerata
- Class: Arachnida
- Order: Opiliones
- Suborder: Dyspnoi
- Superfamily: Troguloidea
- Family: Nipponopsalididae; Martens, 1976
- Genus: Nipponopsalis; Martens & Suzuki, 1966

Type species
- Ischyropsalis abei Sato & Suzuki, 1939

Diversity
- 1 genus, 3 species

= Nipponopsalis =

Family of harvestmen

Nipponopsalididae is a family of harvestmen with three described species in one genus, Nipponopsalis, which is found in East Asia.

== Name ==
The genus name Nipponopsalis is a combination of Nippon, meaning Japan, where the genus was first discovered, and the ending of the harvestman genus Ischyropsalis, which comes from the Greek "psalis" (scissors), referring to the long chelicerae.

== Description ==
They range in body length from 2.3 to 4.1 mm. The carapace is domed, with a large, low ocularium, and rather large eyes. The pedipalps and legs are very long and slender, and the chelicerae are longer than their body and heavily sclerotized. These chelicerae are superficially similar to those found in some Ischyropsalidioids, although this is a case of convergence. The cheliceral fingers exhibit 2 forms of teeth: narrow diaphanous teeth in the middle, and courser teeth distally.

The opisthosoma is generally poorly sclerotized, and the corona analis is incomplete. The segmentation of the dorsum differs between males and females, as females generally are less heavily sclerotized than males, and exhibit a scutum laminatum or scutum dissectum, with each opisthosomal tergite free, whereas the males exhibit a scutum parvum, with the first 5 opisthosomal tergites fused together. Further sexual dimorphisms include size, as females are larger than males, and the chelicerae, which are stouter and stronger in males, and which exhibit different sex-based armature.

The penis shaft is long, slender, and gradually tapering, and the glans is three-branched. The two lateral branches of the glans appear as plates that are set with setae and shield the median branch, which houses the opening of the seminal duct.

In at least one species, N. abei, clavate glandular setae are present on the pedipalps of juveniles, but are lost during development to adulthood; it is not known if this is the case for the other species in the genus. This ontogenic characteristic is also found in the related family Dicranolasmatidae.

They can be distinguished from other long-jawed Dyspnoi, like Ischyropsalis, Taracus, and Oskoron, by the complete absence of any spines on the second thoracic segment, though they are not known to be sympatric with any of those genera.

== Distribution ==
This family is very geographically conserved, and is known only from East Asia, primarily the four main Japanese islands. They are also known from South Korea, the more southern Japanese islands of Yakushima and Amami Ōshima, and most of the Kuril Islands, except for Urup.

== Relationships ==
Nipponopsalididae belong to the superfamily Troguloidea. They have been regarded as a sister group to all remaining Troguloidea, though the most recent Opiliones phylogeny places them as the sister group to a clade consisting of Dicranolasmatidae and Trogulidae, with Nemastomatidae as sister to all remaining Troguloidea. An internal phylogeny has not yet been conducted for this family. When originally described, the superficial morphological similarities between Nipponopsalis and Ischyropsalis led Nipponopsalis to be placed within that genus, though it is now known to be distinct, and morphological similarities between the two genera are a result of convergence.

- Troguloidea
  - Nipponopsalididae
  - - Nemastomatidae
    - - Dicranolasmatidae
      - Trogulidae

Recovered by Giribet et al. (2002)

- Troguloidea
  - Nemastomatidae
  - - Nipponopsalididae
    - - Dicranolasmatidae
      - Trogulidae

Recovered by Fernández et al. (2017)

== Species ==
=== Nipponopsalis abei (Sato & Suzuki, 1939) ===
Synonym: Ischyropsalis abei Sato & Suzuki, 1939

This species was discovered in Iwakuni, in the Yamagutchi prefecture in southern Japan. It was the first species of the genus to be described.

The chelicerae of this species exhibit unique, conspicuous apophyses. Both male and female individuals possess apophyses on the first cheliceral segment, though they are considerably larger in males than in females. In males, the most pronounced apophysis faces inwards, but in females, the most pronounced apophyses face outwards. Males also possess another apophysis on the second segment, which extends backwards and overlaps with the pronounced apophysis on the first segment. The penis in this species has a pair of soft bubble-like protuberances near the base of the glans, which are not found in other species. The glans is also longer than that of N. yezoensis, and the shaft is longer than that of N. coreana.

==== Nipponopsalis abei abei (Sato & Suzuki, 1939) ====
Synonym: Ischyropsalis abei Sato & Suzuki, 1939

This subspecies is known from the three Japanese islands of Honshu, Kyoshu, and Shikoku. This subspecies has more swollen male cheliceral apophyses and considerably shorter legs than N. abei longipes. Leg measurements (in millimeters) for males are : I 11, II 20, III 11, IV 15.

==== Nipponopsalis abei longipes Suzuki, 1973 ====
This subspecies is known from the island of Amami-oshima, one of the Satsunan Islands. It represents the southernmost distribution of the genus. This subspecies has distinctly narrower male cheliceral apophyses and considerably longer legs than N. abei abei. Leg measurements (in millimeters) for males are: I 22, II 40, III 23, IV 33.

=== Nipponopsalis coreana (Suzuki, 1966) ===
Synonym: Ischyropsalis coreana Suzuki, 1966

This species was discovered in Chungju, Korea, and was the first to be discovered outside of Japan.

The male chelicerae in this species exhibit a unique, notable protuberance basally on the second segment. In addition, the penis shaft is shorter and broader than that of the other species, with a proportionally larger glans.

=== Nipponopsalis yezoensis (Suzuki, 1958) ===
Synonym: Ischyropsalis yezoensis Suzuki, 1958

This species was discovered in Akan National Park, in Hokkaido. Additional specimens have since been collected in the Kuril Islands of eastern Russia. This species represents the northernmost distribution of the genus.

This species exhibits unique male palpal morphology, with the tibia connected to the patella via a short stalk, and swollen basally; the tibia and tarsus are also densely covered in short hairs. Unlike the other species, male chelicerae in this species feature only small tubercles, rather than conspicuous armature. The penis shaft is proportionally longer than in other species, with a shorter glans.

This species is absent from Urup Island in the central Kurils, and the populations from the Kurils north of Urup show clear morphological differences in the chelicerae and male pedipalps from the populations south of Urup into Hokkaido, suggesting that the Iturup Strait, between the islands of Iturup and Urup, has served as an important geographical barrier separating these two groups.
