= Epedanoidea =

Scientific classification
- Kingdom: Animalia
- Phylum: Arthropoda
- Subphylum: Chelicerata
- Class: Arachnida
- Order: Opiliones
- Suborder: Laniatores
- Infraorder: Grassatores
- Superfamily: Epedanoidea; Sørensen, 1886

Diversity
- 5 families

Superfamily of harvestmen/daddy longlegs

Epedanoidea is a small superfamily of the Grassatores.

== Distribution ==
It includes around 355 species distributed in Asia, primarily Southeast Asia.

== Families ==
- Beloniscidae Kury, Pérez-González & Proud, 2019
- Epedanidae Sørensen, 1886
- Petrobunidae Sharma & Giribet, 2011
- Podoctidae Roewer, 1912
- Tithaeidae Sharma & Giribet, 2011
