= Tithaeidae =

Scientific classification
- Domain: Eukaryota
- Kingdom: Animalia
- Phylum: Arthropoda
- Subphylum: Chelicerata
- Class: Arachnida
- Order: Opiliones
- Suborder: Laniatores
- Infraorder: Grassatores
- Superfamily: Epedanoidea
- Family: Tithaeidae; Sharma & Giribet, 2011

Genera
- See text for list

Diversity
- 5 genera, c. 41 spp

Family of harvestmen/daddy longlegs

Tithaeidae is a family of the harvestman infraorder Grassatores, Epedanoidea with about 40 described species.

The Tithaeidae are endemic to East and South-east Asia.

== Description ==
They are typically relatively small harvestmen, often dwelling in leaf litter.

== Name ==
The type genus Tithaeus is derived from Ancient Greek, which Thorell (1890) states in a footnote as "Τιθαιος, nom. prop. person". This possibly reflects Herodotus's The Histories, Book VII: "The captains of horse were Harmamithres and Tithaeus, sons of Datis"

== Genera ==
- Istithaeus Roewer, 1949
- Kondosus Roewer, 1949
- Sterrhosoma Thorell, 1891
- Tithaeomma Roewer, 1949
- Tithaeus Thorell, 1890
- †Ellenbergellus Bartel, Dunlop, Sharma, Selden, Ren & Shih, 2021 Burmese amber, Myanmar, Cenomanian
