= Acropsopilionoidea =

Acropsopilionoidea Temporal range: Palaeogene–present

Scientific classification
- Kingdom: Animalia
- Phylum: Arthropoda
- Subphylum: Chelicerata
- Class: Arachnida
- Order: Opiliones
- Suborder: Dyspnoi
- Superfamily: Acropsopilionoidea; Roewer, 1923

Families
- Acropsopilionidae Simon, 1879

Diversity
- 1 family, 3 genera

Family of harvestmen/daddy longlegs

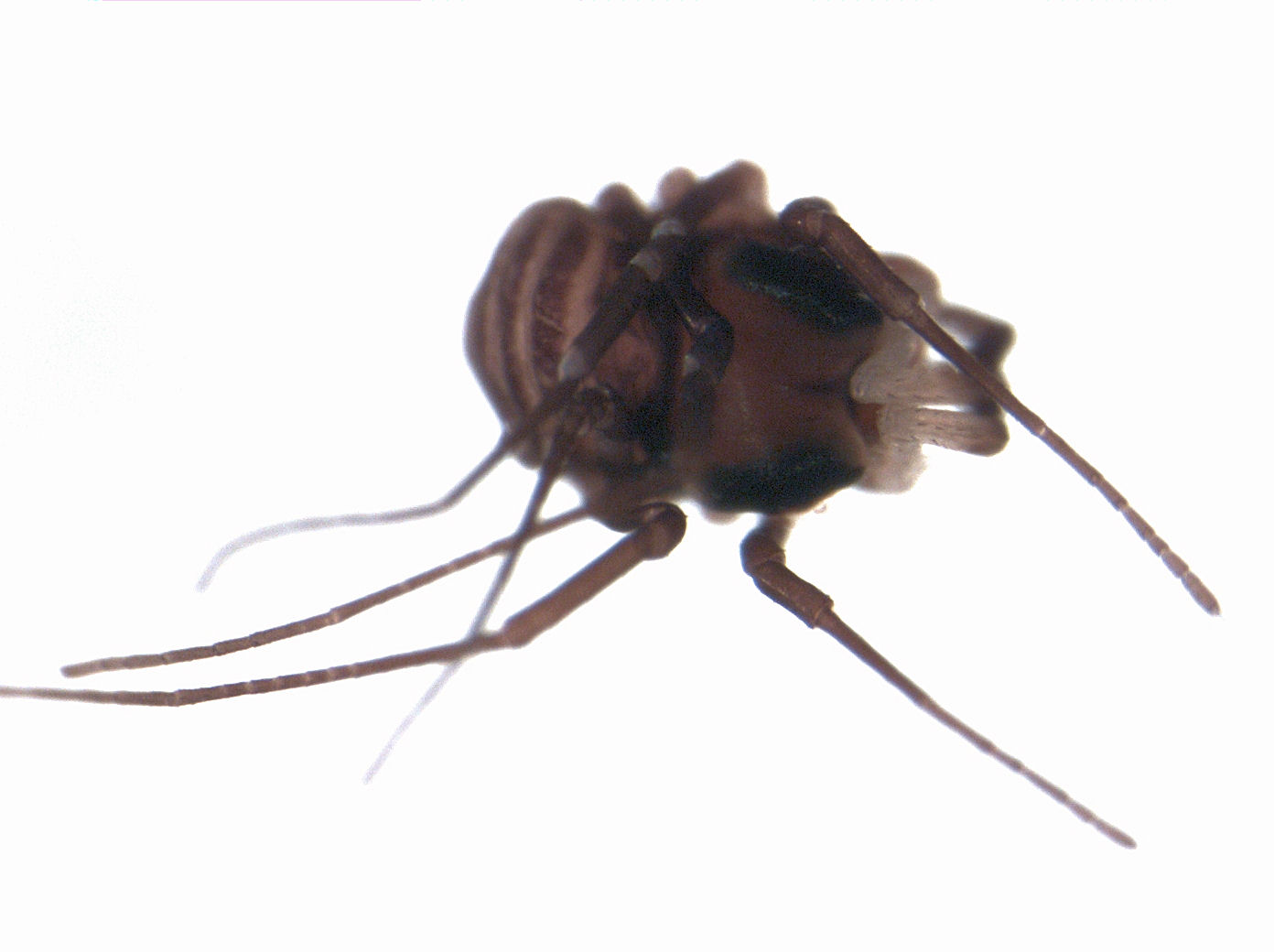
adult Acropsopilio neozelandiae (dorsal)

Acropsopilionoidea is a superfamily of harvestmen with 1 family and 3 genera, found in North America (United States, Canada and Mexico) and the Southern Hemisphere (Australia, New Zealand, plus Chile, Argentina and Brazil) (as of 2023).

== Description ==
The superfamily Acropsopilionoidea was described by Roewer, 1923, with the type genus as Acropsopilio Silvestri, 1904 by original monotypy.

== Taxonomy ==
Acropsopilionoidea contains the following families, per World Catalog of Opiliones. Of the 3 genera (as of 2023), the scheme below reflects Schönhofer (2013)

- Acropsopilionidae Roewer, 1923

Likely associated with this Superfamily:

- †Halithersidae Dunlop, Selden & Giribet, 2016
  - † Halitherses Giribet & Dunlop, 2005

  - † Halitherses grimaldii Giribet & Dunlop, 2005 – Fossil: Cretaceous (Cenomanian) Burmese amber
