= Petrobunidae =

Scientific classification
- Domain: Eukaryota
- Kingdom: Animalia
- Phylum: Arthropoda
- Subphylum: Chelicerata
- Class: Arachnida
- Order: Opiliones
- Suborder: Laniatores
- Infraorder: Grassatores
- Superfamily: Epedanoidea
- Family: Petrobunidae; Sharma & Giribet, 2011

Genera
- See text for list

Diversity
- 3 genera, 8 spp

Family of harvestmen/daddy longlegs

Petrobunidae is a family of the harvestman infraorder Grassatores, Epedanoidea with about 8 described extant species.

The Petrobunidae are endemic to East and South-east Asia.

== Description ==
They are typically relatively small harvestmen, often dwelling in leaf litter.

== Name ==
The type genus Petrobunus Sharma & Giribet, 2011 is derived from Ancient Greek ‘Pétrā’ (πέτρᾱ), meaning ‘stone’ or ‘pebble’; and ‘-bunus’, a common suffix in Opiliones taxonomy (e.g. Hadrobunus, Triaenobunus, Dibunus). The prefix is in reference to males of this genus, which when seen by eye appear to have pebbles on the proximal fourth leg due to their greatly enlarged trochanter IV. It is also wordplay, as the type species Petrobunus schwendingeri Sharma & Giribet, 2011 was named in honour of Dr Peter J. Schwendinger (Sharma & Giribet, 2011, p.115), whose given name has the Latin equivalent Petrus, with the same Greek origins as above (see Sharma & Giribet, 2011, p.111).

== Genera ==
- Petrobunus Sharma & Giribet, 2011
- Proscotolemon Roewer, 1916
- Zalmoxida Roewer, 1912
- †Petroburma Bartel, Dunlop, Sharma, Selden, Tarasov, Ren & Shih, 2022 — Burmese amber, Myanmar (Cenomanian)
