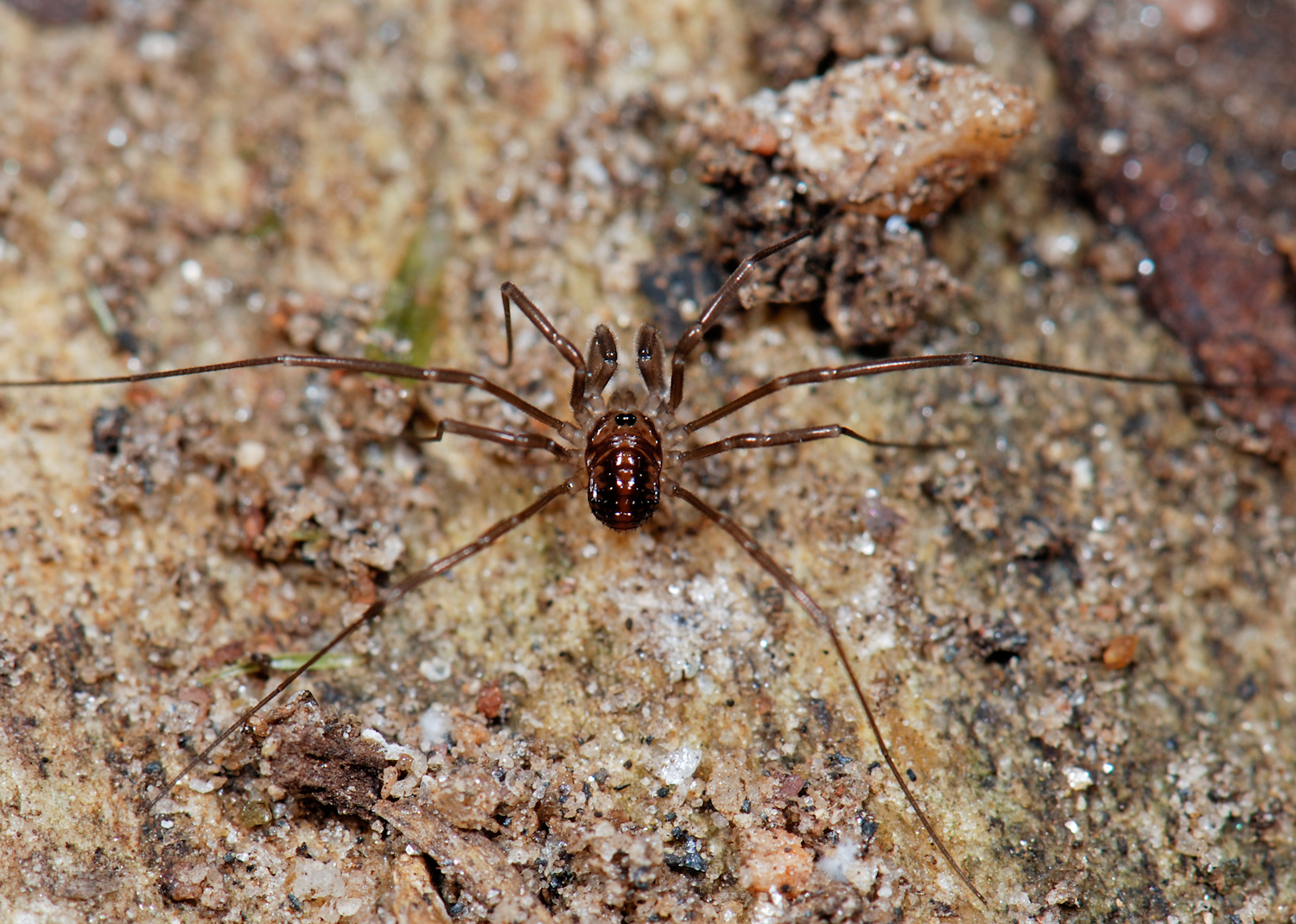
- Sabacon cavicolens

Scientific classification
- Kingdom: Animalia
- Phylum: Arthropoda
- Subphylum: Chelicerata
- Class: Arachnida
- Order: Opiliones
- Suborder: Dyspnoi; Hansen & Sørensen, 1904

Superfamilies
- Acropsopilionoidea; Ischyropsalidoidea; Troguloidea

Diversity
- 8 families, 356 species

= Dyspnoi =

Dyspnoi Temporal range: Carboniferous–present

Suborder of harvestmen/daddy longlegs

Dyspnoi is a suborder of harvestmen, currently comprising 43 extant genera and 356 extant species, although more species are expected to be described in the future. The eight families are currently grouped into three superfamilies: the Acropsopilionoidea, Ischyropsalidioidea, and Troguloidea.

== Distribution ==
The Dyspnoi are one of the most biogeographically conserved higher groups of harvestmen. With the exception of Acropsopilioidea, none occur in the Southern Hemisphere, and most families are restricted along temperate regions. The only exceptions are some Ortholasmatinae (Nemastomatidae) inhabiting the tropics on high mountains in Mexico (Ortholasma bolivari) and northern Thailand (Dendrolasma angka).

== Systematics ==
- Acropsopilionoidea
  - Acropsopilionidae (3 genera, 19 species)
  - †Halithersidae monotypic, Burmese amber, Myanmar, Cenomanian
- Ischyropsalidoidea
  - Ischyropsalidoidea Incertae sedis
    - Crosbycus dasycnemus
    - Hesperonemastoma (5 species)
  - Ischyropsalididae
    - Ceratolasmatinae (2 genera, 8 species)
    - Ischyropsalidinae (1 genus, 23 species)
  - Sabaconidae (1 genus, 57 species)
  - Taracidae (2 genera, 17 species)
- Troguloidea
  - Dicranolasmatidae (1 genus, 16 species)
  - Nemastomatidae
    - Nemastomatinae (19 genera, 125+ species)
    - Ortholasmatinae (7 genera, 27 species)
  - Nipponopsalididae (1 genus, 3 species)
  - Trogulidae (5 genera, 65 species [plus 1 extinct])
