= List of Podoctidae species =

This is a list of the described species of the harvestman family Podoctidae. The data is from (as of mid. 2024) the World Catalog of Opiliones. Older versions were largely from the now defunct Joel Hallan's Biology Catalog.

== Erecananinae ==
Erecananinae Roewer, 1912

- Erecanana Strand, 1911

- Erecanana defensa Goodnight & Goodnight, 1959 — Kenya
- Erecanana dentipes Kauri, 1985 — Democratic Republic of the Congo
- Erecanana insulana Roewer, 1949 — Réunion
- Erecanana lentiginosa Lawrence, 1962 — Tanzania
- Erecanana mordax (Sørensen, 1910) — Tanzania
- Erecanana quadridens Lawrence, 1962 — Tanzania
- Erecanana remyi (Roewer, 1949) — Madagascar
- Erecanana subinermis Caporiacco, 1947 — Kenya
- Erecanana typus (Sørensen, 1910) — Tanzania, Rwanda.

- Iyonus Suzuki, 1964

- Iyonus yuyama Suzuki, 1964 — Japan

- Lomanius Roewer, 1923

- Lomanius annae Kury & Machado, 2018 — Vietnam
- Lomanius bulbosus Zhang et al, 2013 — China (Yunnan)
- Lomanius carinatus Suzuki, 1976 — Malaysia (Negeri Sembilan)
- Lomanius formosae (Roewer, 1912) — Taiwan
- Lomanius minimus Roewer, 1926 — Philippines (Luzón: Laguna)
- Lomanius rectipes (Roewer, 1963) — Philippines (Luzón, Negros Island Region)
- Lomanius tridens (Loman, 1905) — Indonesia (Java: Jawa Barat)

- Paralomanius Goodnight & Goodnight, 1948

- Paralomanius longipalpus Goodnight & Goodnight, 1948 — Palau (Note: some older online databases mis-cite "Lomanius longipalpus Goodnight & Goodnight, 1957", which is a recombination, not a homonym.)
- Paralomanius mindanaoensis (Suzuki, 1977) — Philippines (Davao Prov.)

- Strandibalonius Roewer, 1912

- Strandibalonius abnormis (Strand, 1911) — Papua New Guinea
- Strandibalonius biantipalpis (Roewer, 1915) — Papua New Guinea
- Strandibalonius cervicornis (Strand, 1911)— Papua New Guinea
- Strandibalonius esakii (Suzuki, 1941) — Micronesia (Caroline Islands)
- Strandibalonius femoralis (Roewer, 1949) — Papua New Guinea
- Strandibalonius gracilipes (Roewer, 1915) — Papua New Guinea
- Strandibalonius longipalpis (Roewer, 1915) — Papua New Guinea
- Strandibalonius obscurus (Roewer, 1915) — Papua New Guinea
- Strandibalonius oppositus (Roewer, 1927) — Indonesia (Borneo/ Kalimantan Selatan)
- Strandibalonius scaber (Roewer, 1915) — Papua New Guinea
- Strandibalonius spinatus (Roewer, 1949) — Indonesia
- Strandibalonius spinulatus (Roewer, 1915) — Papua New Guinea
- Strandibalonius strucki (Goodnight & Goodnight, 1947) — Papua New Guinea
- Strandibalonius tenuis (Roewer, 1949) — Indonesia (Sulawesi)
- Strandibalonius triceratops (Kury & Machado, 2018) — Papua New Guinea
- Strandibalonius yalomensis (Suzuki, 1982) — Melanesia (Bismarck Archipelago)

== Ibaloniinae ==
Ibaloniinae Roewer, 1912

- Asproleria Roewer, 1949

- Asproleria albituberculata Roewer, 1949 — New Guinea

- Austribalonius Forster, 1955

- Austribalonius horridus Forster, 1955 — Australia (Queensland)

- Ceylonositalces Özdikmen, 2006 (Replacement name for Eusitalces Roewer, 1915).

- Ceylonositalces parvulus (Roewer, 1915) — Sri Lanka

- Gargenna Roewer, 1949

- Gargenna coronata Roewer, 1949 — Indonesia (Nusa Tenggara Barat)

- Heteroibalonius Goodnight & Goodnight, 1947

- Heteroibalonius malkini Goodnight & Goodnight, 1947 — Indonesia (Papua)

- Heteropodoctis Roewer, 1912

- Heteropodoctis quinquespinosus (Roewer, 1911) — Papua New Guinea/Indonesia (South Papua)

- Holozoster Loman, 1902

- Holozoster ovalis Loman, 1902 — Seychelles

- Ibalonianus Roewer, 1923

- Ibalonianus impudens (Loman, 1906) — Indonesia (Papua Barat)
- Ibalonianus kueckenthali (Hirst, 1912) — Indonesia (Maluku Islands)
- Ibalonianus prasinus Roewer, 1949 — Papua New Guinea
- Ibalonianus waigenensis Roewer, 1949 — Indonesia (Papua Barat)

- Ibalonius Karsch, 1880

- Ibalonius breoni (Simon, 1879) — Réunion
- Ibalonius dubius (Goodnight & Goodnight, 1948) — Russell Islands (inc. Ibalonianus rainbowi — Solomon Islands
- Ibalonius ferrugineus (Roewer, 1912) — Philippines (contra "ferrugineum")
- Ibalonius flavopictus Hirst, 1911 — Seychelles (contra "flavopictum")
- Ibalonius impudens Loman, 1906 — Indonesia (Papua Barat), Papua New Guinea
- Ibalonius inscriptus Loman, 1902 — Seychelles
- Ibalonius jagorii Karsch, 1880 —Philippines (Luzón) (contra "jagori")
- Ibalonius karschii Loman, 1902 — Seychelles
- Ibalonius lomani Hirst, 1911 — Seychelles
- Ibalonius maculatus (Roewer, 1915) — Papua New Guinea
- Ibalonius quadriguttatus Hirst, 1912 — Indonesia (Maluku Islands)
- Ibalonius sarasinorum Roewer, 1913 — Indonesia (Sulawesi Utara)
- Ibalonius semperi (Roewer, 1912) — Philippines

- Ibalonius semperi apoensis Suzuki, 1977
- Ibalonius semperi semperi (Roewer, 1912)

- Ibalonius simoni Roewer, 1915 — New Guinea
- Ibalonius tuberculatus Suzuki, 1977 — Philippines
- Ibalonius umbonatus (Roewer, 1927) — Philippines

- Leytpodoctis Martens, 1993

- Leytpodoctis oviger Martens, 1993 — Philippines

- Orobunus Goodnight & Goodnight, 1947

- Orobunus quadrispinosus Goodnight & Goodnight, 1947 — Papua New Guinea

- Paramesoceras Roewer, 1915

- Paramesoceras novoguineense Roewer, 1915 — Papua New Guinea (Note: Species as neuter formation per Kury et al. 2020)

- Pentacros Roewer, 1949

- Pentacros margaritatus Roewer, 1949 — Indonesia (Papua Barat)

- Podoctinus Roewer, 1923

- Podoctinus willeyi (Hirst, 1912) — Papua New Guinea (West Britain Island)

- Proholozoster Roewer, 1915

- Proholozoster neoguinensis Roewer, 1915 — Papua New Guinea

- Santobius Roewer, 1949

- Santobius annulipes (Sørensen, 1886) — Melanesia (Fiji), (New Caledonia)
- Santobius cubanus (Šilhavý, 1969) — Cuba (Introduced!)
- Santobius spiniger (Sørensen, 1886) — Melanesia (Fiji), (New Caledonia) (Note, masculine form may be "spinigerus")
- Santobius spinitarsus Roewer, 1949 — Melanesia (New Hebrides)

- Sitalcicus Roewer, 1923

- Sitalcicus gardineri (Hirst, 1911) — Seychelles
- Sitalcicus incertus Rambla, 1983 — Seychelles
- Sitalcicus novemtuberculatus (Simon, 1879) — Réunion

- Waigeucola Roewer, 1949

- Waigeucola palpalis Roewer, 1949 — Indonesia (West Papua)

== Podoctinae ==
Podoctinae Roewer, 1912

- Baramella Roewer, 1949

- Baramella quadrispina (Roewer, 1915) — Indonesia/ Malaysia? ("Borneo")

- Baramia Hirst, 1912

- Baramia echinosa Banks, 1930 — Malaysia (Sarawak)
- Baramia longipes Banks, 1930 — Brunei
- Baramia solitaria Roewer, 1949 — Indonesia (Sumatra: Riau Kepulauan)
- Baramia vorax Hirst, 1912 — Malaysia (Sarawak), Indonesia (Borneo: Kalimantan Selatan)

- Baso Roewer, 1923

- Baso jacobsoni Roewer, 1923 — Indonesia (Sumatra: Sumatera Barat)

- Basoides Roewer, 1949

- Basoides mucronatus (Roewer, 1927) — Indonesia (Sumatra: Sumatera Barat)

- Bistota Roewer, 1927

- Bistota horrida Roewer, 1927 — India (Maharashtra, Tamil Nadu)

- Bonea Roewer, 1914 (Note, adjectival endings may be masculine).

- Bonea albertus Roewer, 1914 — Indonesia (Borneo, possibly Malaysian Borneo)
- Bonea armatissima (Roewer, 1949) — Indonesia (Borneo, possibly Malaysian Borneo)
- Bonea cippata (Roewer, 1927) — Philippines (Laguna, Palawan)
- Bonea longipalpis Suzuki, 1977 — Philippines (Palawan)
- Bonea palpalis (Roewer, 1949) — Indonesia (Java: Jawa Timur)
- Bonea sarasinorum Roewer, 1914 — Indonesia (Sulawesi: Gorontalo)
- Bonea scopulata (Roewer, 1949) — Singapore
- Bonea silvestris (Roewer, 1949) — Malaysia (Sarawak)
- Bonea tridigitata Zhang, Kury & Zhang, 2013 — China (Hainan)
- Bonea zhui Zhang, Kury & Zhang, 2013 — China (Hainan)

- Borneojapetus Özdikmen, 2006 (Replacement name for peoccupied Japetus Roewer, 1949).

- Borneojapetus longipes (Roewer, 1949) — Indonesia/Malaysia ("Borneo")

- Centrobunus Loman, 1902

- Centrobunus braueri Loman, 1902 — Seychelles (possibly extinct)

- Dongmoa Roewer, 1927

- Dongmoa oshimensis Suzuki, 1964 — Japan
- Dongmoa silvestrii Roewer, 1927 — Vietnam

- Eupodoctis Roewer, 1923

- Eupodoctis annulatipes (Roewer, 1912) — Sri Lanka
- Eupodoctis indicus (Hirst, 1911) — India

- Eurytromma Roewer, 1949

- Eurytromma pictulum (Pocock, 1903) — Sri Lanka. (Contra misgendered 'pictulus' in some online sources).

- Gaditusa Roewer, 1949

- Gaditusa coxalis Roewer, 1949 — Indonesia/Malaysia ("Borneo")

- Hoplodino Roewer, 1915

- Hoplodino continentalis Roewer, 1915 — Singapore
- Hoplodino gapensis Suzuki, 1972 — Malaysia (Selangor/Pahang)
- Hoplodino hoogstraali Suzuki, 1977 — Philippines
- Hoplodino longipalpis Roewer, 1949 — Indonesia (Sulawesi)

- Idjena Roewer, 1927

- Idjena dammermani Roewer, 1927 — Indonesia (Java)

- Idzubius Roewer, 1949

- Idzubius akiyamae (Hirst, 1911) — Japan

- Laponcea Roewer, 1936

- Laponcea cippata Roewer, 1936 — Mauritius

- Lejokus Roewer, 1949

- Lejokus silvestris Roewer, 1949 — Malaysia (Sarawak)

- Lundulla Roewer, 1927

- Lundulla bifurcata Roewer, 1927 — Malaysia (Sarawak)

- Metapodoctis Roewer, 1915

- Metapodoctis formosae Roewer, 1915 — Taiwan
- Metapodoctis siamensis S. Suzuki, 1985 — Thailand

- Neopodoctis Roewer, 1912

- Neopodoctis ceylonensis Roewer, 1912 — Sri Lanka
- Neopodoctis taprobanicus (Hirst, 1912) — Sri Lanka

- Oppodoctis Roewer, 1927

- Oppodoctis armatus Roewer, 1927 — Philippines

- Peromona Roewer, 1949

- Peromona erinacea Roewer, 1949 — Seychelles

- Podoctellus Roewer, 1949

- Podoctellus johorensis Roewer, 1949 — Malaysia (Johore)

- Podoctis Thorell, 1890

- Podoctis armatissimus Thorell, 1890 — Malaysia (Pinang)

- Podoctomma Roewer, 1949

- Podoctomma javanum Roewer, 1949 — Indonesia (Java)

- Podoctops Roewer, 1949

- Podoctops multimaculatus Roewer, 1949 — Indonesia (Sumatra) (* contra "multimaculatum" in Hallan, later altered to masculine per Kury et al. 2020)

- Pumbaraius Roewer, 1927

- Pumbaraius kempi Roewer, 1927 — India
- Pumbaraius malabarensis Roewer, 1949 — India

- Sibolgia Roewer, 1923

- Sibolgia jacobsoni Roewer, 1923 — Indonesia (Sumatra)

- Stobitus Roewer, 1949

- Stobitus spinipes Roewer, 1949 — Malaysia Malaya

- Tandikudius Roewer, 1929

- Tandikudius rugosus Roewer, 1929 — India

- Trencona Roewer, 1949

- Trencona setipes Roewer, 1949 — Indonesia/Malaysia (Borneo)

- Trigonobunus Loman, 1894

- Trigonobunus spinifer Loman, 1894 — Indonesia (West Kalimantan)

- Tryssetus Roewer, 1936

- Tryssetus spinarmatus Roewer, 1936 — Mauritius

- Vandaravua Roewer, 1929

- Vandaravua carli Roewer, 1929 — India

Note: For Dino Loman, in Weber 1892 and Dino weberi Loman, in Weber 1892 see under Epedanidae per Kury (2008).
