= List of Opiliones of Trinidad and Tobago =

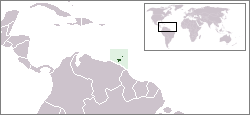
Location of Trinidad and Tobago in the Caribbean

This is a list of the opiliones or harvestmen of Trinidad and Tobago. Representatives of ten families are currently known to live on Trinidad, the information on Tobago is still sparse.

Goodnight and Goodnight produced one of the first listings of Trinidad opiliones in 1947 in a paper in which they named several new species. In Kury's 2003 catalogue of New World opiliones Trinidad was covered as well. The most recent work was done by Townsend, Proud and Moore in 2008 and included several new species that are still awaiting identification.

== Agoristenidae ==
- Trinella albiornata (Goodnight and Goodnight, 1947)
- Trinella intermedia (Goodnight and Goodnight, 1947)
- Trinella leiobuniformis (Šilhavý, 1973)

== Cosmetidae ==
- Cynortula granulata Roewer, 1912
- Cynortula modesta (Sørenson, 1932)
- Cynortula undulata Roewer, 1947
- Libitiosoma granulatum Roewer, 1947
- Paecilaema adspersum Roewer, 1947
- Paecilaema inglei Goodnight and Goodnight, 1947
- Paecilaema paucipustulatum Roewer, 1947
- Vonones testaceus Roewer, 1947

== Cranaidae ==
- Phareicranaus calcariferus (Simon, 1879) (Santinezia serratotibialis Roewer, 1932 was previously listed as a separate species but is now assumed to be a synonym of P. calcariferus.)

== Manaosbiidae ==
- Cranellus montgomeryi Goodnight and Goodnight, 1947
- Rhopalocranaus albilineatus Roewer, 1932

== Samoidae ==
- Maracaynatum trinidadense Šilhavý, 1979
- Pellobunus longipalpus Goodnight and Goodnight, 1947

== Sclerosomatidae ==
- Holcobunus aureopunctata
- Prionostemma fulginosum
- Prionostemma insulare
- Prionostemma referens
- Prionostemma vittatum Roewer, 1910

== Stygnidae ==
- Stygnoplus clavotibialis (Goodnight and Goodnight, 1947)

== Zalmoxidae ==
- Ethobunus tuberculatus (Goodnight and Goodnight, 1947)

== Kimulidae ==
- Unidentified species

== Stygnommatidae ==
- Stygnomma sp.

== See also ==
- Natural history of Trinidad and Tobago
