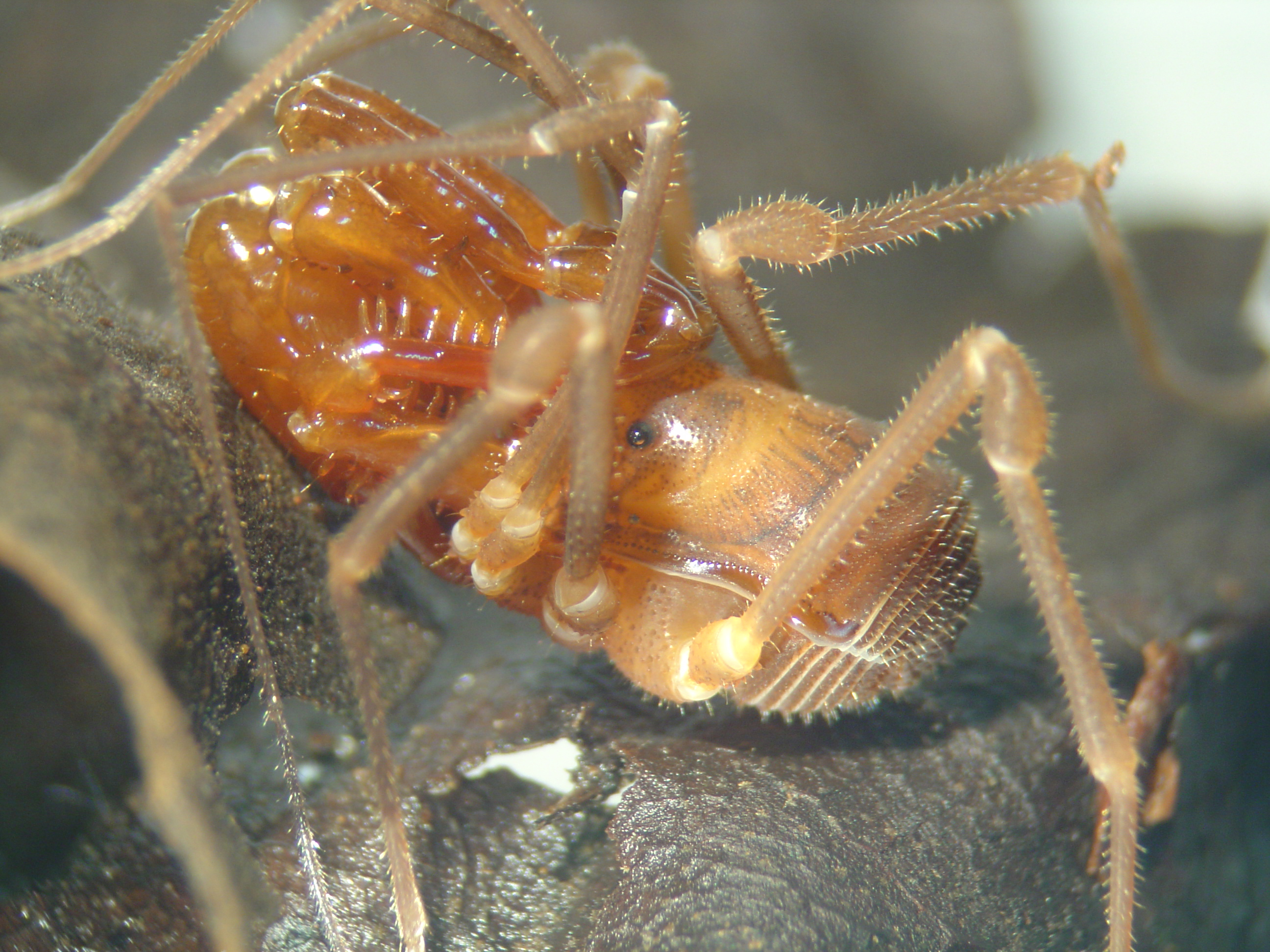
- Stygnomma sp. from Costa Rica

Scientific classification
- Domain: Eukaryota
- Kingdom: Animalia
- Phylum: Arthropoda
- Subphylum: Chelicerata
- Class: Arachnida
- Order: Opiliones
- Superfamily: Samooidea
- Family: Stygnommatidae; Roewer, 1923

Species
- See text for list

Diversity
- 1 genus, c. 34 species

= Stygnommatidae =

Family of harvestmen/daddy longlegs

Stygnommatidae is a small neotropical family of the harvestman infraorder Grassatores with about thirty described species.

== Description ==
Stygnommatidae range from three to six millimeters in body length. Some species have chelicerae that effectively double their length. The pedipalps are strong, enlarged and armed. The legs are relatively short. These harvestmen dwell in litter, with some species found in caves.

== Distribution ==
Members of this family are found in the neotropics from Mexico to Brazil. Some species are found in southern Florida and others in Indonesia and Malaysia, but it is not sure that these belong into this family.

== Relationships ==
The monophyly of this family is disputed. Its closest relatives within the Samooidea are Samoidae, Biantidae and Podoctidae.

== Name ==
The name of the type genus is combined from the genus name Stygnus and Ancient Greek omma "eye", referring to the eyes that are separated like in Stygnus.

== Species ==
The following belong in Stygnomma Roewer, 1912

- Stygnomma annulipes (Goodnight & Goodnight, 1947) — Mexico
- Stygnomma batatalense González-Sponga, 2005
- Stygnomma belizense Goodnight & Goodnight, 1977 — Belize
- Stygnomma bispinatum Goodnight & Goodnight, 1953 — Mexico
- Stygnomma cubiroense González-Sponga, 2005
- Stygnomma delicatulum Rambla, 1976 — Ecuador
- Stygnomma fiskei Rambla, 1969 — Jamaica
- Stygnomma fuentesi González-Sponga, 2005
- Stygnomma fuhrmanni Roewer, 1912 — Colombia, Costa Rica, Panama, Venezuela
- Stygnomma furvum González-Sponga, 1987 — Venezuela
- Stygnomma gracilitibiae M. A. González-Sponga, 1987 — Venezuela
- Stygnomma granulosum (Goodnight & Goodnight, 1947) — Belize (=Stygnomma maya Goodnight & Goodnight, 1951)
- Stygnomma jajoense González-Sponga, 2005
- Stygnomma joannae Rambla, 1976 — Ecuador
- Stygnomma larense González-Sponga, 1987 — Venezuela
- Stygnomma leleupi Rambla, 1976 — Ecuador
- Stygnomma macrochelae González-Sponga, 2005
- Stygnomma monagasiense Soares & Avram, 1981 — Venezuela
- Stygnomma ornatum González-Sponga, 1987 — Venezuela
- Stygnomma planum Goodnight & Goodnight, 1953 — Mexico
- Stygnomma purpureum M. A. González-Sponga, 1987 — Venezuela
- Stygnomma salmeronense González-Sponga, 2005
- Stygnomma solisitiens M. A. González-Sponga, 1987 — Venezuela
- Stygnomma spiniferum (Packard, 1888)

- Stygnomma spiniferum spiniferum (Packard, 1888) — Florida, Jamaica
- Stygnomma spiniferum bolivari (Goodnight & Goodnight, 1945) — Cuba
- Stygnomma spiniferum tancahense Goodnight & Goodnight, 1951 — Mexico, Belize

- Stygnomma spinipalpis Goodnight & Goodnight, 1953 — Mexico
- Stygnomma spinula (Goodnight & Goodnight, 1942) — Puerto Rico
- Stygnomma teapense Goodnight & Goodnight, 1951 — Mexico
- Stygnomma toledense Goodnight & Goodnight, 1977 — Belize
- Stygnomma truxillense M. A. González-Sponga, 1987 — Venezuela
- Stygnomma tuberculatum Goodnight & Goodnight, 1973 — Mexico
