= List of Zalmoxidae species =

This is a list of the described species of the harvestman family Zalmoxidae. Data on Neotropical species is mostly taken from Joel Hallan's Biology Catalog. Data on Indo-Pacific species is taken from the Sharma et al. (2011) Zootaxa catalog.

- Absonus M. A. González-Sponga, 1987

- Absonus ayalai M. A. González-Sponga, 1987 — Venezuela
- Absonus caracasensis M. A. González-Sponga, 1987 — Venezuela

- Araguita M. A. González-Sponga, 1987

- Araguita speciosa M. A. González-Sponga, 1987 — Venezuela

- Avilaia González-Sponga, 1998

- Avilaia cordillerensis González-Sponga, 1998

- Azulitaia M. A. González-Sponga, 1987

- Azulitaia rubicunda M. A. González-Sponga, 1987 — Venezuela

- Buruquelia González-Sponga, 1999

- Buruquelia cornifera González-Sponga, 1999 — Venezuela

- Carayaca González-Sponga, 1998

- Carayaca ornata González-Sponga, 1998

- Cea M. A. González-Sponga, 1987

- Cea lanceolata M. A. González-Sponga, 1987 — Venezuela

- Cersa V. Silhavy, 1979

- Cersa kratochvili V. Silhavy, 1979 — Cuba

- Chamaia M. A. González-Sponga, 1987

- Chamaia convexa M. A. González-Sponga, 1987 — Venezuela

- Chirimena González-Sponga, 1999

- Chirimena brevigranulata González-Sponga, 1999

- Cochirapha Roewer, 1949

- Cochirapha rugipes Roewer, 1949 — Ecuador

- Cubiria M. A. González-Sponga, 1987

- Cubiria inflata González-Sponga, 1999
- Cubiria peculiaris M. A. González-Sponga, 1987 — Venezuela

- Curimaguanus González-Sponga, in Kury 2003

- Curimaguanus infrequentis (M. A. González-Sponga, 1987) — Venezuela

- Ethobunus Chamberlin, 1925

- Ethobunus acanthotibialis (Goodnight & Goodnight, 1953) — Mexico
- Ethobunus albitrochanteris (Roewer, 1933) — Costa Rica
- Ethobunus armatus (Roewer, 1954) — El Salvador
- Ethobunus atroluteus (Roewer, 1949) — Costa Rica
- Ethobunus brasiliensis (Mello-Leitão, 1941) — Brazil
- Ethobunus brevis (Roewer, 1949) — Costa Rica
- Ethobunus calvus (González-Sponga, 2000) — Venezuela
- Ethobunus ceriseus (Sørensen, 1932) — Costa Rica
- Ethobunus cubensis (V. Silhavy, 1979) — Cuba
- Ethobunus filipes (Roewer, 1949) — Costa Rica
- Ethobunus foliatus (Goodnight & Goodnight, 1983) — Costa Rica
- Ethobunus gertschi (Goodnight & Goodnight, 1942) — Panama
- Ethobunus goodnighti (Rambla, 1969) — Jamaica
- Ethobunus gracililongipes (M. A. González-Sponga, 1987) — Venezuela
- Ethobunus gracilipes (Roewer, 1949) — Costa Rica
- Ethobunus llorensis (Goodnight & Goodnight, 1983) — Costa Rica
- Ethobunus longus (Goodnight & Goodnight, 1942) — Costa Rica
- Ethobunus meridionalis (Caporiacco, 1951) — Venezuela
- Ethobunus minutus (Goodnight & Goodnight, 1977) — Belize
- Ethobunus misticus (Goodnight & Goodnight, 1977) — Belize
- Ethobunus parallelus (Goodnight & Goodnight, 1942) — Costa Rica
- Ethobunus pecki (Rambla, 1969) — Jamaica
- Ethobunus pilosus (Goodnight & Goodnight, 1953) — Mexico
- Ethobunus rectipes (Roewer, 1927) — Venezuela
- Ethobunus simplex Chamberlin, 1925 — Panama
- Ethobunus tarsalis (Banks, 1909) — Costa Rica
- Ethobunus tenuis (Roewer, 1949) — Costa Rica
- Ethobunus trochantericus (Roewer, 1949)
- Ethobunus tuberculatus (Goodnight & Goodnight, 1947) — Trinidad
- Ethobunus vitensis (Goodnight & Goodnight, 1983) — Costa Rica
- Ethobunus xiomarae (González-Sponga, 1998) — Venezuela
- Ethobunus zalmoxiformis (Roewer, 1949) — Costa Rica
- Ethobunus zebroides (V. Silhavy, 1979) — Cuba

- Exlineia Mello-Leitão, 1942

- Exlineia fulvescens Mello-Leitão, 1943 — Ecuador
- Exlineia milagroi Mello-Leitão, 1942 — Ecuador
- Exlineia rhinoceros Mello-Leitão, 1945 — Ecuador

- Galanomma Juberthie, 1970

- Galanomma microphthalma Juberthie, 1970 — Ecuador

- Garanhunsa Roewer, 1949

- Garanhunsa pectanalis Roewer, 1949 — Brazil

- Granulaia M. A. González-Sponga, 1997

- Granulaia stygnoides González-Sponga, 1997 — Venezuela

- Guagonia M. A. González-Sponga, 1987

- Guagonia multispina M. A. González-Sponga, 1987 — Venezuela

- Guayania González-Sponga, 1999

- Guayania inflata González-Sponga, 1999

- Haitonia M. A. González-Sponga, 1987

- Haitonia alba M. A. González-Sponga, 1987 — Venezuela

- Jajinia M. A. González-Sponga, 1987

- Jajinia bromeliaca M. A. González-Sponga, 1987 — Venezuela
- Jajinia jajinia González-Sponga, 1998 — Venezuela

- Junquito González-Sponga, 1999

- Junquito denticuloso González-Sponga, 1999

- Lara M. A. González-Sponga, 1987

- Lara absonustarsalis M. A. González-Sponga, 1987 — Venezuela

- Metapachylus F. O. Pickard-Cambridge, 1905

- Metapachylus gracilis F. O. Pickard-Cambridge, 1905 — Mexico

- Micro M. A. González-Sponga, 1987

- Micro obtusangulus M. A. González-Sponga, 1987 — Venezuela

- Niquitaia González-Sponga, 1999

- Niquitaia convexa González-Sponga, 1999

- Orituco M. A. González-Sponga, 1987

- Orituco gracilipalpi M. A. González-Sponga, 1987 — Venezuela
- Orituco pariensis M. A. González-Sponga, 1991 — Venezuela
- Orituco tuberculosa M. A. González-Sponga, 1987 — Venezuela
- Orituco tuyensis M. A. González-Sponga, 1987 — Venezuela

- Ovalia González-Sponga, 1999

- Ovalia spinosa González-Sponga, 1999

- Pachylicus Roewer, 1923

- Pachylicus acutus (Goodnight & Goodnight, 1942) — Mexico, Belize, Guatemala
- Pachylicus castaneus (Silhavy, 1979) — Cuba
- Pachylicus cotoensis Goodnight & Goodnight, 1983 — Costa Rica
- Pachylicus petrunkevitchi (Mello-Leitão, 1944) — Panama
- Pachylicus foveolatus Goodnight & Goodnight, 1983 — Costa Rica
- Pachylicus hirsutus (Roewer, 1949)
- Pachylicus hispidus Goodnight & Goodnight, 1983 — Costa Rica
- Pachylicus rugosus (Banks, 1909) — Costa Rica
- Pachylicus spinatus Goodnight & Goodnight, 1983 — Costa Rica

- Panaquire M. A. González-Sponga, 1987

- Panaquire calva M. A. González-Sponga, 1987 — Venezuela

- Panopiliops Roewer, 1949

- Panopiliops inops Goodnight & Goodnight, 1983 — Costa Rica
- Panopiliops reimoseri (Roewer, 1949) — Costa Rica

- Paraminuella Caporiacco, 1951

- Paraminuella bristowei Caporiacco, 1951 — Venezuela

- Paramo M. A. González-Sponga, 1987

- Paramo meridensis M. A. González-Sponga, 1987 — Venezuela
- Paramo regaladoi González-Sponga, 1999

- Parascotolemon Roewer, 1912

- Parascotolemon bipunctus (González-Sponga, 1987) — Venezuela
- Parascotolemon hirsutus (Goodnight & Goodnight, 1942) — Guyana
- Parascotolemon ornatus Roewer, 1912 — Fr.Guiana

- Phalangodinella Caporiacco, 1951

- Phalangodinella araguitensis M. A. González-Sponga, 1987 — Venezuela
- Phalangodinella arida M. A. González-Sponga, 1987 — Venezuela
- Phalangodinella bicalcanei M. A. González-Sponga, 1987 — Venezuela
- Phalangodinella calcanei M. A. González-Sponga, 1987 — Venezuela
- Phalangodinella callositas M. A. González-Sponga, 1987 — Venezuela
- Phalangodinella caporiaccoi M. A. González-Sponga, 1987 — Venezuela
- Phalangodinella coffeicola M. A. González-Sponga, 1987 — Venezuela
- Phalangodinella longipes M. A. González-Sponga, 1987 — Venezuela
- Phalangodinella pilosa M. A. González-Sponga, 1987 — Venezuela
- Phalangodinella pittieri M. A. González-Sponga, 1987 — Venezuela
- Phalangodinella roeweri Caporiacco, 1951
- Phalangodinella santaeroseae M. A. González-Sponga, 1987 — Venezuela
- Phalangodinella tropophyla M. A. González-Sponga, 1987 — Venezuela

- Phalangoduna Roewer, 1949

- Phalangoduna granosa Roewer, 1949 — Costa Rica

- Pijiguaia González-Sponga, 1998

- Pijiguaia albina González-Sponga, 1998

- Pilosa González-Sponga, 1999

- Pilosa pilosa González-Sponga, 1999

- Pirassunungoleptes H. Soares, 1966

- Pirassunungoleptes analis (Roewer, 1949) — Brazil
- Pirassunungoleptes calcaratus H. Soares, 1966 — Brazil
- Pirassunungoleptes lesserti (Roewer, 1949) — Bolivia

- Protodiasia Ringuelet, 1955

- Protodiasia saltensis Ringuelet, 1955 — Argentina

- Retropedis M. A. González-Sponga, 1987

- Retropedis magnapatella M. A. González-Sponga, 1987 — Venezuela

- Sivianus Roewer, 1949

- Sivianus titschacki Roewer, 1949 — Peru

- Soledadiella M. A. González-Sponga, 1987

- Soledadiella barinensis M. A. González-Sponga, 1987 — Venezuela
- Soledadiella macrochelae M. A. González-Sponga, 1987 — Venezuela
- Soledadiella pentaculeata González-Sponga, 1999

- Sphoeroforma M. A. González-Sponga, 1987

- Sphoeroforma familiaris M. A. González-Sponga, 1987 — Venezuela
- Sphoeroforma fernandezi M. A. González-Sponga, 1987 — Venezuela
- Sphoeroforma minima M. A. González-Sponga, 1987 — Venezuela
- Sphoeroforma pusilla M. A. González-Sponga, 1987 — Venezuela

- Spiniella M. A. González-Sponga, 1987

- Spiniella grandituberculosa M. A. González-Sponga, 1987 — Venezuela

- Stygnoleptes Banks, 1914

- Stygnoleptes analis Banks, 1914 — Costa Rica, Panama, Colombia
- Stygnoleptes crassus (Sørensen, 1932) — Colombia
- Stygnoleptes gibber (Roewer, 1954) — El Salvador
- Stygnoleptes sellatus (Roewer, 1954) — El Salvador
- Stygnoleptes tarmanus (Roewer, 1956) — Peru

- Taguaza González-Sponga, 1998

- Taguaza eliptica González-Sponga, 1998 — Venezuela

- Tegipiolus Roewer, 1949

- Tegipiolus pachypus Roewer, 1949 — Brazil

- Tiara M. A. González-Sponga, 1987

- Tiara unispina M. A. González-Sponga, 1987 — Venezuela

- Timoleon Sørensen, 1932

- Timoleon armatanalis Roewer, 1956 — Peru
- Timoleon crassipes Sørensen, 1932 — Colombia

- Traiania H. E. M. Soares & S. Avram, 1981

- Traiania abundantis M. A. González-Sponga, 1987 — Venezuela
- Traiania arairensis M. A. González-Sponga, 1987 — Venezuela
- Traiania cacaotera M. A. González-Sponga, 1987 — Venezuela
- Traiania cimarronera M. A. González-Sponga, 1987 — Venezuela
- Traiania debellardi M. A. González-Sponga, 1991 — Venezuela
- Traiania inexspectata M. A. González-Sponga, 1987 — Venezuela
- Traiania mujicai M. A. González-Sponga, 1987 — Venezuela
- Traiania orghidani H. E. M. Soares & S. Avram, 1981 — Venezuela
- Traiania simpatrica M. A. González-Sponga, 1987 — Venezuela
- Traiania simplex M. A. González-Sponga, 1987 — Venezuela
- Traiania torrealbai M. A. González-Sponga, 1987 — Venezuela
- Traiania triangularis M. A. González-Sponga, 1987 — Venezuela
- Traiania venadoensis González-Sponga, 1998 — Venezuela

- Unare M. A. González-Sponga, 1987

- Unare videodifficultatis M. A. González-Sponga, 1987 — Venezuela

- Unicornia M. A. González-Sponga, 1987

- Unicornia flava M. A. González-Sponga, 1987 — Venezuela

- Urachiche M. A. González-Sponga, 1987

- Urachiche nerysae M. A. González-Sponga, 1987 — Venezuela

- Viacha Roewer, 1949

- Viacha granulata Roewer, 1949 — Bolivia

- Weyrauchiana Roewer, 1952

- Weyrauchiana oxapampa Roewer, 1952 — Peru

- Yacambuia M. A. González-Sponga, 1987

- Yacambuia yacambuiensis M. A. González-Sponga, 1987 — Venezuela

- Zalmoxis Sørensen, in L. Koch 1886

- Zalmoxis armatus (Roewer, 1949) — New Guinea
- Zalmoxis armatipes Strand, 1910 — New Guinea
- Zalmoxis aspersus Roewer, 1949 — Milgrave I., Torres Strait
- Zalmoxis austerus Hirst, 1912 — New Guinea
- Zalmoxis australis (Roewer, 1949) — New Guinea
- Zalmoxis bonka (Forster, 1949) — Solomon Is.
- Zalmoxis bendis Sharma et al., 2012 — Borneo
- Zalmoxis brevipes (Roewer, 1949) — New Guinea
- Zalmoxis cardwellensis Foster, 1955 — Queensland
- Zalmoxis cheesmani (Roewer, 1949) — New Guinea
- Zalmoxis convexus (Roewer, 1949) — New Guinea
- Zalmoxis crassitarsis S. Suzuki, 1982 — Bismarck Archipelago
- Zalmoxis cuspanalis (Roewer, 1926) — Philippines
- Zalmoxis dammermani (Roewer, 1927) — Java
- Zalmoxis darwinensis Goodnight & Goodnight, 1948) — Australia
- Zalmoxis derzelas Sharma et al., 2012 — Philippines
- Zalmoxis gebeleizis Sharma et al., 2012 — Philippines
- Zalmoxis falcifer Sharma, 2012 — Queensland
- Zalmoxis furcifer Sharma, 2012 — Queensland
- Zalmoxis ferrugineus (Roewer,1912) — Seychelles Is.
- Zalmoxis granulatus (Loman, 1902) — Bismarck Archipelago
- Zalmoxis heynemani Suzuki, 1977 — Philippines
- Zalmoxis insula Forster, 1955 — Dauan I., Torres Strait
- Zalmoxis insularis (Roewer, 1949) — Fiji
- Zalmoxis jewetti (Goodnight & Goodnight, 1947) — New Guinea
- Zalmoxis kaiensis S. Suzuki, 1982 — Moluccas
- Zalmoxis kaktinsae Sharma, 2012 — New Caledonia
- Zalmoxis kotys Sharma et al., 2012 — Borneo
- Zalmoxis lavacaverna G. S. Hunt, 1993 — Queensland
- Zalmoxis lavongaiensis (Suzuki, 1985) — New Britain
- Zalmoxis luzonicus Roewer, 1949 — Philippines
- Zalmoxis maculosus (Roewer, 1949) — New Guinea
- Zalmoxis marchei Roewer, 1912 — Marianas
- Zalmoxis mendax Sharma, 2012 — New Caledonia
- Zalmoxis mindanaonica Suzuki, 1977 — Philippines
- Zalmoxis minimus Roewer, 1912 — New Guinea
- Zalmoxis mitobatipes (Roewer, 1926) — Philippines
- Zalmoxis muelleri (Mueller, 1917) — New Guinea
- Zalmoxis mutus (Roewer, 1949) — New Guinea
- Zalmoxis neobritanicus S. Suzuki, 1982 — Bismarck Archipelago
- Zalmoxis neocaledonicus Roewer, 1912 — New Caledonia
- Zalmoxis neoguinensis (Roewer, 1915) — New Guinea
- Zalmoxis occidentalis (Roewer, 1949) — Mauritius
- Zalmoxis pallidus (Roewer, 1915) — New Guinea
- Zalmoxis patellaris (Roewer, 1949) — New Guinea
- Zalmoxis perditus Sharma, 2012 — New Caledonia
- Zalmoxis ponapeus (Roewer, 1949) — Pohnpei, Micronesia
- Zalmoxis princeps Sharma, 2012 — New Caledonia
- Zalmoxis pumilus (Roewer, 1949) — New Guinea
- Zalmoxis pygmaeus Sørensen, in L. Koch 1886 — Fiji
- Zalmoxis remingtoni (Goodnight & Goodnight, 1948) — New Caledonia
- Zalmoxis robustus Sørensen, in L. Koch 1886 — Polynesia
- Zalmoxis sabazios Sharma et al., 2012 — Philippines
- Zalmoxis savesi (Simon, 1880) — New Caledonia
- Zalmoxis sarasinorum Roewer, 1913 — Sulawesi
- Zalmoxis sepikus (Roewer, 1949) — New Guinea
- Zalmoxis similis S. Suzuki, 1982 — Bismarck Archipelago
- Zalmoxis sorenseni Simon, 1892 — Philippines
- Zalmoxis solitarius (Roewer, 1916) — Pohnpei, Micronesia; Jaluit Atoll, Marshall Is.
- Zalmoxis spinicoxa Roewer, 1949 — New Guinea
- Zalmoxis thorelli (Roewer, 1915) — New Guinea
- Zalmoxis tuberculatus Goodnight & Goodnight, 1948 — New Caledonia
- Zalmoxis zibelthiurdos Sharma et al., 2012 — Borneo
