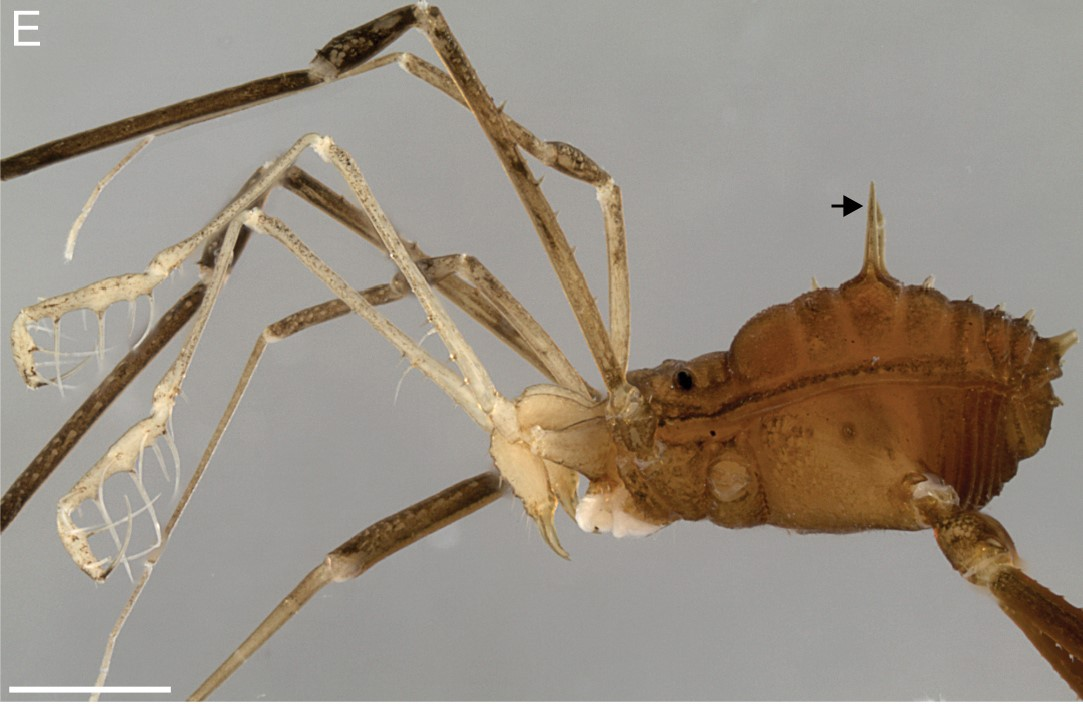

Scientific classification
- Kingdom: Animalia
- Phylum: Arthropoda
- Subphylum: Chelicerata
- Class: Arachnida
- Order: Opiliones
- Family: Biantidae
- Genus: Metalacurbs
- Species: M. foordi

Binomial name
- Metalacurbs foordi Pérez-González & Mamani, 2024

= Metalacurbs foordi =

Species of harvestman

Metalacurbs foordi is a species of harvestman in the family Biantidae, known only from one male specimen collected from the Ankasa Conservation Area, Ghana in 2013. Its biology is unknown.

== Etymology ==
The specific epithet foordi honors the South African arachnologist Stefan Hendrik Foord (1971-2023) for his contributions to African arachnology.

== Description ==
Metalacurbs foordi is 2.78 mm long and 1.14 mm wide. It can be distinguished from other species in the subfamily Lacurbsinae by a basally enlarged second metatarsus and dorsal spines on the fourth femur. Additionally, it is the only Lacurbsinae species for which the male genitalia are described.
