= Icaleptidae =

Scientific classification
- Kingdom: Animalia
- Phylum: Arthropoda
- Subphylum: Chelicerata
- Class: Arachnida
- Order: Opiliones
- Infraorder: Grassatores
- Family: Icaleptidae; Kury & Pérez, 2002

Species
- see text

Diversity
- 2 monotypic genera

Family of harvestmen/daddy longlegs

The Icaleptidae are a small family of neotropical harvestmen within the suborder Laniatores. Although only two species have been described, many more are probably to be discovered.

== Name ==
The name of the type genus is combined from Ica, a Chibchan people inhabiting the slopes of Sierra Nevada de Santa Marta, and the second half of the genus Gonyleptes (Gonyleptidae), the first described harvestman in Laniatores.

== Description ==
The two described species have their fourth pair of legs ventrally inserted, giving them a flea-like habitus.

== Distribution ==
Although Icaleptidae have until now only been described from Ecuador (Cotopaxi) and northern Colombia (Sierra Nevada de Santa Marta), they are expected to occur in Venezuela. Both species were found in leaf litter. The type material of the two species was collected in 1968 (I. malkini) and 1993 (Z. platnicki).

== Relationships ==
This new family is closely related to Zalmoxidae and Fissiphalliidae. Some species that now reside in other families, such as Phalangodinella (Zalmoxidae) share similarities with the species in Icaleptidae. It is possible that several species now in other families will be transferred here.

== Species ==
- Icaleptes Kury & Pérez, 2002

- Icaleptes malkini Kury & Pérez, 2002

- Zalmopsylla Kury & Pérez, 2002

- Zalmopsylla platnicki Kury & Pérez, 2002
