= Dongmoa silvestrii =

Scientific classification
- Domain: Eukaryota
- Kingdom: Animalia
- Phylum: Arthropoda
- Subphylum: Chelicerata
- Class: Arachnida
- Order: Opiliones
- Family: Podoctidae
- Genus: Dongmoa
- Species: D. silvestrii

Binomial name
- Dongmoa silvestrii Roewer, 1927

Species of harvestman/daddy longlegs

Dongmoa silvestrii is a harvestman species in the genus Dongmoa found in Tonking.

== See also ==
- List of Podoctidae species
