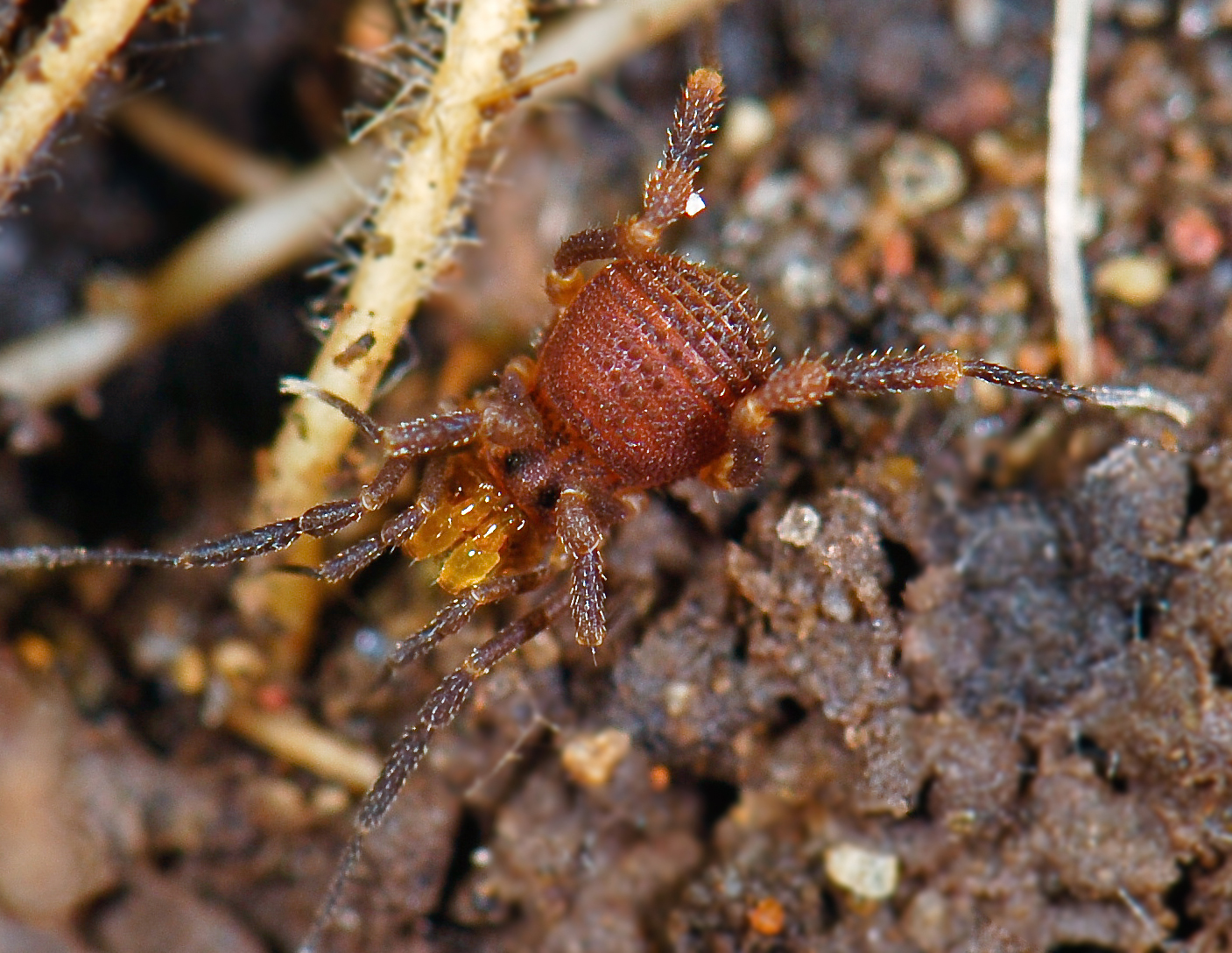
- Pellobunus insularis

Scientific classification
- Domain: Eukaryota
- Kingdom: Animalia
- Phylum: Arthropoda
- Subphylum: Chelicerata
- Class: Arachnida
- Order: Opiliones
- Infraorder: Grassatores
- Superfamily: Samooidea; Sørensen, 1886

Families
- See text for list.

= Samooidea =

Superfamily of harvestmen/daddy longlegs

Samooidea is a large superfamily in the Grassatores group of harvestmen. It includes around 380 species distributed throughout the tropics. They are characterized by the complex male genitalia, with eversible complementary sclerites.

The Samooidea are closely related to Zalmoxoidea, although the exact relationships are not yet understood.

== Families included ==
- Biantidae Thorell, 1889
- Escadabiidae Kury & Pérez, 2003
- Kimulidae Pérez, Kury & Alonso-Zarazaga, 2007
- Podoctidae Roewer, 1912
- Samoidae Sørensen, 1886
- Stygnommatidae Roewer, 1923

(also with Neoscotolemon as incertae sedis).
