= Zalmoxis (disambiguation) =

Zalmoxis is a divinity of the Getae and Dacians

Zalmoxis may also refer to:

- Zalmoxis (harvestman), a genus of arachnids in the family Zalmoxidae

== See also ==
- Zamolxis (bug), a genus of insects in the family Reduviidae
