= Guasiniidae =

Scientific classification
- Domain: Eukaryota
- Kingdom: Animalia
- Phylum: Arthropoda
- Subphylum: Chelicerata
- Class: Arachnida
- Order: Opiliones
- Infraorder: Grassatores
- Family: Guasiniidae; González-Sponga, 1997

Genera
- See text for list.

Synonyms
- Guasinidae

Family of harvestmen/daddy longlegs

The Guasiniidae are a family of harvestman with three described species from South America.

It is, together with the Fissiphalliidae and the Ogoveidae, one of the least diverse harvestman families.

The family is probably closely related to the Zalmoxidae and Fissiphalliidae.

All described species in this family are completely eyeless (anophthalmic).

González-Sponga found the two first species inside bark under litter, G. persephone was also found inside soil, in an inundation-forest of black-water (igapó) at Tarumã-Mirim, near the mouth of Rio Negro, 20 km upstream from Manaus. The region is flooded for almost half a year.

Current research suggests that the two described genera should be merged into one.

== Species ==
- Guaiquinimia González-Sponga, 1997

- Guaiquinimia longipes González-Sponga, 1997 (Venezuela)

- Guasinia González-Sponga, 1997

- Guasinia delgadoi González-Sponga, 1997 (Venezuela)
- Guasinia persephone Pinto-da-Rocha & Kury, 2003 (Brazil)
