= List of Biantidae species =

This is a list of the described species of the harvestman family Biantidae. The data is taken from Joel Hallan's Biology Catalog. [Some updates from WCO, 2025]

== Biantinae ==
Biantinae Thorell, 1889

- Anaceros Lawrence, 1959 — Madagascar

- Anaceros anodonta Lawrence, 1959
- Anaceros canidens Lawrence, 1959
- Anaceros humilis Lawrence, 1959
- Anaceros pauliani Lawrence, 1959

- Biantella Roewer, 1927

- Biantella reticulata Roewer, 1927 — Cameroon

- Biantes Simon, 1885

- Biantes albimanum (Loman, 1902) — Seychelles
- Biantes aelleni Silhavy, 1973
- Biantes annapurnae J. Martens, 1978 — Nepal
- Biantes atroluteus Roewer, 1914 — India
- Biantes brevis J. Martens, 1978 — Nepal
- Biantes carli Roewer, 1929 — India
- Biantes conspersus Roewer, 1927 — Bombay
- Biantes dilatatus J. Martens, 1978 — Nepal
- Biantes fuscipes Thorell, 1890 — Pinang
- Biantes gandaki J. Martens, 1978 — Nepal
- Biantes gandakoides J. Martens, 1978 — Nepal
- Biantes ganesh J. Martens, 1978 — Nepal
- Biantes godavari J. Martens, 1978 — Nepal
- Biantes gurung J. Martens, 1978 — Nepal
- Biantes jirel J. Martens, 1978 — Nepal
- Biantes kathmandicus J. Martens, 1978 — Nepal
- Biantes lecithodes Thorell, 1899 — Burma
- Biantes longimanus Simon, 1885 — India
- Biantes magar J. Martens, 1978 — Nepal
- Biantes minimus M. Rambla, 1983 — Seychelles
- Biantes newar J. Martens, 1978 — Nepal
- Biantes parvulus (Herbst, 1911) — Seychelles
- Biantes pernepalicus J. Martens, 1978 — Nepal
- Biantes quadrituberculatus Roewer, 1929 — India
- Biantes rarensis J. Martens, 1978 — Nepal
- Biantes sherpa J. Martens, 1978 — Nepal
- Biantes simplex J. Martens, 1978 — Nepal
- Biantes thakkhali J. Martens, 1978 — Nepal
- Biantes thamang J. Martens, 1978 — Nepal
- Biantes vitellinus Thorell, 1890 — Sumatra

- Biantessus Roewer, 1949

- Biantessus vertebralis (Lawrence, 1933) — South Africa
- Biantessus nigrotarsus (Lawrence, 1933) — South Africa

- Biantomma Roewer, 1942

- Biantomma nigrospinosum Roewer, 1942 — Bioko

- Clinobiantes Roewer, 1927

- Clinobiantes paradoxus Roewer, 1927 — Cameroon

- Cryptobiantes Kauri, 1962

- Cryptobiantes protector Kauri, 1961

- Eubiantes Roewer, 1915

- Eubiantes africanus Roewer, 1915 — eastern Africa

- Fageibiantes Roewer, 1949

- Fageibiantes bicornis (Fage, 1946) — Madagascar
- Fageibiantes bispina (Lawrence, 1959)

- Hinzuanius Karsch, 1880

- Hinzuanius africanus Pavesi, 1883 — Ethiopia
- Hinzuanius comorensis (Roewer, 1949) — Comoros
- Hinzuanius flaviventris (Pocock, 1903) — Socotra
- Hinzuanius gracilis (Roewer, 1949) — Madagascar
- Hinzuanius indicus (Roewer, 1915)
- Hinzuanius insulanus Karsch, 1880 — Comoros
- Hinzuanius littoralis (Lawrence, 1959)
- Hinzuanius madagassis (Roewer, 1949) — Madagascar
- Hinzuanius mauriticus Roewer, 1927
- Hinzuanius milloti (Fage, 1946) — Madagascar
- Hinzuanius pardalis (Lawrence, 1959)
- Hinzuanius pauliani (Lawrence, 1959)
- Hinzuanius tenebrosus (Lawrence, 1959)
- Hinzuanius vittatus (Simon, 1885) — Madagascar

- Ivobiantes Lawrence, 1965

- Ivobiantes spinipalpis Lawrence, 1965

- Metabiantes Roewer, 1915 [Updates on WCO, 2025]

- Metabiantes armatus Lawrence, 1962 –Tanzania
- Metabiantes barbertonensis Lawrence, 1963
- Metabiantes basutoanus Kauri, 1961
- Metabiantes cataracticus Kauri, 1961
- Metabiantes convexus Roewer, 1949 — Rewenzori, East Africa
- Metabiantes filipes (Roewer, 1912) — Cameroon
- Metabiantes flavus Lawrence, 1949 — Angola
- Metabiantes hanstroemi Kauri, 1961
- Metabiantes incertus Kauri, 1961
- Metabiantes insulanus (Roewer, 1949) — Principe
- Metabiantes jeanneli (Roewer, 1913) — Kenya
- Metabiantes kakololius Kauri, 1985 — Zaire
- Metabiantes kosibaiensis Kauri, 1961
- Metabiantes lawrencei Starega, 1992 –Tanzania [=obscurus Lawrence, 1962]
- Metabiantes leighi (Pocock, 1902) — South Africa (Natal)
- Metabiantes litoralis Kauri, 1961
- Metabiantes longipes Kauri, 1985 — Zaire
- Metabiantes machadoi Lawrence, 1957
- Metabiantes meraculus (Loman, 1898) — South Africa [= maximus Lawrence, 1931]
- Metabiantes minutus Kauri, 1985 — Zaire
- Metabiantes montanus Kauri, 1985 — Zaire
- Metabiantes obscurus Kauri, 1961
- Metabiantes parvulus Kauri, 1985 — Zaire
- Metabiantes perustus Lawrence, 1963
- Metabiantes pumilio Roewer, 1927
- Metabiantes punctatus (Sørensen, 1910) — eastern Africa
- Metabiantes pusulosus (Loman, 1898) — Natal
- Metabiantes rudebecki Kauri, 1961
- Metabiantes stanleyi Kauri, 1985 — Zaire
- Metabiantes submontanus Kauri, 1985 — Zaire
- Metabiantes teres Lawrence, 1963
- Metabiantes teretipes Lawrence, 1962 –Tanzania
- Metabiantes traegardhi Kauri, 1961
- Metabiantes trifasciatus Roewer, 1915 –Tanzania
- Metabiantes ulindinus Kauri, 1985 — Zaire
- Metabiantes unicolor (Roewer, 1912) –Tanzania, Kenya [?]
- Metabiantes urbanus Kauri, 1961
- Metabiantes varius Kauri, 1961
- Metabiantes zuluanus Lawrence, 1937 — Natal
- Metabiantes zuurbergianus Kauri, 1961

- Monobiantes Lawrence, 1962

- Monobiantes benoiti Lawrence, 1962

- Probiantes Roewer, 1927

- Probiantes croceus Roewer, 1927 — Bombay

- Tetebius Roewer, 1949

- Tetebius latibunus Roewer, 1949 — Tete, Mozambique

(Note: Moved from older placement in Samoidae)

== Lacurbsinae ==
Lacurbsinae Lawrence, 1959

- Eulacurbs Roewer, 1949

- Eulacurbs paradoxa Roewer, 1949 — Ghana

- Heterolacurbs Roewer, 1912

- Heterolacurbs ovalis Roewer, 1912 — Error -Togo(?), likely U.S. Virgin Islands (inc. syn. Martibianta virginsulana Silhavy, 1973 — Virgin Islands) (!After Hallan)
- Heterolacurbs perezassoi Alegre & Armas, 2012 (!After Hallan)

- Lacurbs Sørensen, 1896

- Lacurbs spinosa Sørensen, 1896 — Cameroon
- Lacurbs nigrimana Roewer, 1912 — Ivory Coast

- Metalacurbs Roewer, 1914

- Metalacurbs cornipes (Roewer, 1958)
- Metalacurbs oedipus (Roewer, 1958)
- Metalacurbs simoni Roewer, 1914 — western Africa
- Metalacurbs villiersi (Roewer, 1953)

- Prolacurbs Roewer, 1949

- Prolacurbs singularis Roewer, 1949 — Ghana

== Stenostygninae ==
Stenostygninae Roewer, 1913

- Bidoma Silhavy, 1973

- Bidoma indivisum Silhavy, 1973 — Haiti (!Caution original misspelling as indivisa)

- Caribbiantes Silhavy, 1973

- Caribbiantes cubanus Silhavy, 1973 — Cuba

- Decuella Avram, 1977

- Decuella cubaorientalis Avram, 1977 — Cuba

- Galibrotus Silhavy, 1973

- Galibrotus carlotanus Silhavy, 1973 — Cuba
- Galibrotus matiasis Avram, 1977 — Cuba
- Galibrotus riedeli Silhavy, 1973 — Cuba

- Manahunca Silhavy, 1973

- Manahunca bielawskii Silhavy, 1973 — Cuba
- Manahunca cuevajibarae Avram, 1977 — Cuba
- Manahunca silhavyi Avram, 1977 — Cuba

- Negreaella Avram, 1977

- Negreaella fundorai Avram, 1977 — Cuba
- Negreaella palenquensis Avram, 1977 — Cuba
- Negreaella rioindiocubanicola Avram, 1977 — Cuba
- Negreaella vinai Avram, 1977 — Cuba
- Negreaella yumuriensis Avram, 1977 — Cuba

- Stenostygnus Simon, 1879

- Stenostygnus pusio Simon, 1879 — Brazil, French Guiana (Cayenne), Colombia, Ecuador

- Vestitecola Silhavy, 1973

- Vestitecola haitensis Silhavy, 1973 — Haiti

== Zairebiantinae ==
Zairebiantinae Kauri, 1985

- Zairebiantes Kauri, 1985

- Zairebiantes microphthalmus Kauri, 1985 — Democratic Republic of Congo
