= Stygnomma spiniferum =

Scientific classification
- Kingdom: Animalia
- Phylum: Arthropoda
- Subphylum: Chelicerata
- Class: Arachnida
- Order: Opiliones
- Family: Stygnommatidae
- Genus: Stygnomma
- Species: S. spiniferum

Binomial name
- Stygnomma spiniferum (Packard, 1888)

Species of harvestman/daddy longlegs

Stygnomma spiniferum is a species of armoured harvestman in the family Stygnommatidae. It is found in North America.

== Subspecies ==
These three subspecies belong to the species Stygnomma spiniferum:

- Stygnomma spiniferum bolivari (Goodnight and Goodnight, 1945)^{i c g}
- Stygnomma spiniferum spiniferum (Packard, 1888)^{i c g}
- Stygnomma spiniferum tancahense Goodnight and Goodnight, 1951^{i c g}

Data sources: i = ITIS, c = Catalogue of Life, g = GBIF, b = Bugguide.net
