= Sitalcicus incertus =

Conservation status
- Critically endangered, possibly extinct (IUCN 3.1)

Scientific classification
- Kingdom: Animalia
- Phylum: Arthropoda
- Subphylum: Chelicerata
- Class: Arachnida
- Order: Opiliones
- Family: Podoctidae
- Genus: Sitalcicus
- Species: S. incertus

Binomial name
- Sitalcicus incertus (Rambla, 1983)

Species of harvestman/daddy longlegs

Sitalcicus incertus is a species of harvestman in the family Podoctidae. The species is endemic to Silhouette Island of Seychelles.
