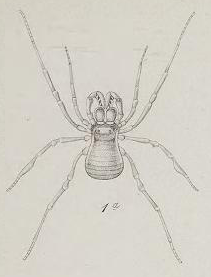
- S. variabilis ♂

Scientific classification
- Kingdom: Animalia
- Phylum: Arthropoda
- Subphylum: Chelicerata
- Class: Arachnida
- Order: Opiliones
- Family: Samoidae
- Genus: Samoa; Sørensen, 1886

Type species
- Samoa variabilis Sørensen, 1886

= Samoa (harvestman) =

Genus of harvestmen/daddy longlegs

Samoa is a genus of harvestmen. It consists of three species:

- Samoa obscura Sørensen, 1886 — Upolu, Samoa; Viti Levu Fiji
- Samoa sechellana Rambla, 1983 — Mahé and Praslin, Seychelles
- Samoa variabilis Sørensen, 1886 — Upolu, Samoa
