= Neoscotolemon =

Scientific classification
- Domain: Eukaryota
- Kingdom: Animalia
- Phylum: Arthropoda
- Subphylum: Chelicerata
- Class: Arachnida
- Order: Opiliones
- Suborder: Laniatores
- Infraorder: Grassatores
- Superfamily: Samooidea
- Genus: Neoscotolemon; Roewer, 1912

Type species
- Scotolemon pictipes Banks, 1908

Diversity
- 7 spp. (see text)

Synonyms
- Citranus Goodnight & Goodnight 1942; Rula Goodnight & Goodnight 1942; Vlachiolus Šilhavý 1979

Genus of harvestmen/daddy longlegs

Neoscotolemon is a genus of harvestmen in the superfamily Samooidea with seven described species (as of January 2025). All species are found in the Greater Antilles and United States of America in Florida. An overview of the taxonomy was provided by Pérez-González et al. (2025).

== Description ==
The genus Neoscotolemon was described by Carl F. Roewer, 1912 with the type species Scotolemon pictipes Banks, 1908.

== Species ==
These species belong to the genus Neoscotolemon:

- Neoscotolemon armasi Pérez-González, Mamani & Proud, 2025 – Cuba
- Neoscotolemon bolivari (Goodnight & Goodnight, 1945) – Cuba
- Neoscotolemon cotilla (Goodnight & Goodnight, 1945) – Cuba
- Neoscotolemon pictipes (Banks, 1908) – Cuba
- Neoscotolemon spinifer (Packard, 1888) – USA (Florida), (plus dubious records from Cayman Islands and Jamaica)
- Neoscotolemon tancahensis (Goodnight & Goodnight, 1951) – Mexico (Yucatán), Belize
- Neoscotolemon vojtechi (Šilhavý, 1979) – Cuba

(Neoscotolemon luzi = Metapellobunus lutzi)

== Etymology ==
The genus is masculine.
