= Centrobunus braueri =

Conservation status
- Extinct (IUCN 3.1)

Scientific classification
- Kingdom: Animalia
- Phylum: Arthropoda
- Subphylum: Chelicerata
- Class: Arachnida
- Order: Opiliones
- Family: Podoctidae
- Genus: Centrobunus
- Species: †C. braueri

Binomial name
- †Centrobunus braueri Loman, 1902

Species of harvestman/daddy longlegs

Centrobunus braueri is an extinct species of arachnids in the order Opiliones, endemic to the Seychelles island of Mahé, where it was found in 1894. No other sightings have been recorded of this species. Therefore, the species has been declared as extinct. Habitat deforestation due to the introduction of the cinnamon tree Cinnamomum verum has been determined to be the cause of extinction.
