= List of Epedanidae species =

This is a list of the described species of the harvestman family Epedanidae. The data is taken from Joel Hallan's Biology Catalog, with a few subsequent updates from World Catalog of Opiliones.

== Dibuninae ==
- Dibuninae Roewer, 1912

- Dibunus Loman, 1906

- Dibunus albitarsus (Roewer, 1927) — Philippines
- Dibunus bakeri (Roewer, 1926) — Philippines (Omitted in Hallan Catalog)
- Dibunus chapmani (Roewer, 1927) — Philippines
- Dibunus dividuus Suzuki, 1977 — Philippines
- Dibunus ferrugineus (Roewer, 1926) — Philippines (Omitted in Hallan Catalog)
- Dibunus gracilis (Roewer, 1912) — Philippines (With mistaken suffix as "gracile" in Hallan)
- Dibunus lagunae Kury, 2020 — Philippines (Subsequent to Hallan, replacement name)
- Dibunus longipalpis Roewer, 1912 — Philippines
- Dibunus maculatipes (Roewer, 1915) — Indonesia (Maluku Islands)
- Dibunus marianae Goodnight & Goodnight, 1957 — Micronesia (Marianas Islands).
- Dibunus pseudobiantes Loman, 1906 — Indonesia (Papua Barat), Papua New Guinea.
- Dibunus similis Roewer, 1912 — Philippines
- Dibunus transitorius (Roewer, 1927) — Philippines

== Epedaninae ==
- Epedaninae Sørensen, in L.Koch 1886

- Alloepedanus Suzuki, 1985

- Alloepedanus robustus Suzuki, 1985 — Thailand

- Balabanus Suzuki, 1977

- Balabanus quadrispinosus Suzuki, 1977 — Philippines

- Caletor Loman 1892 (! amendments after Hallan)

- Caletor bicolor (Sørensen, 1932) — Indonesia (Java)
- Caletor javanus Thorell, 1876 — Indonesia (Java)
- Caletor sumbawanus (Roewer, 1938) — Indonesia (Sumbawa)
- Caletor unguidens Loman, 1892 — Indonesia (Java)

- Caletorellus Roewer, 1938

- Caletorellus siamensis (Hirst, 1912) — Thailand

- Dino Loman, 1892 (Subsequent to Hallan)

- Dino weberi Loman, 1892 — Indonesia (Sumatra)

- Epedanellus Roewer, 1911

- Epedanellus tuberculatus Roewer, 1911 — Japan

- Epedanidus Roewer, 1943 (Year error in Hallan)

- Epedanidus globibunus Roewer, 1943 — Malaysia (Perak) (Year error in Hallan)

- Epedanulus Roewer, 1913

- Epedanulus sarasinorum Roewer, 1913 — Indonesia (Sulawesi)

- Epedanus Thorell, 1876

- Epedanus armatus Banks, 1930 (after Hallan)
- Epedanus brevipalpus Banks, 1930 — Borneo
- Epedanus cavicolus Banks, 1930 — Borneo
- Epedanus pictus Thorell, 1876 — Sarawak
- Epedanus praedo Sørensen, 1932 — Borneo

- Euepedanus Roewer, 1915

- Euepedanus chaiensis Suzuki, 1970
- Euepedanus dividuus Suzuki, 1970
- Euepedanus orientalis (Hirst, 1912) — Thailand
- Euepedanus pentaspinulatus S. Suzuki, 1985 — Thailand
- Euepedanus similis S. Suzuki, 1985 — Thailand
- Euepedanus spinosus S. Suzuki, 1985 — Thailand
- Euepedanus trispinosus Roewer, 1915 — Malacca

- Funkikoa Roewer, 1927

- Funkikoa maxima Roewer, 1927 — Taiwan

- Heteroepedanus Roewer, 1912

- Heteroepedanus monacantha (Roewer, 1911)
- Heteroepedanus triacantha (Roewer, 1911)

- Aboriscus Roewer, 1940

- Aboriscus singularis (Roewer, 1912) — India, Malaysia
- Aboriscus longipes (Roewer, 1913) — India
- Aboriscus aborensis (Roewer, 1913) — India

- Lobonychium Roewer, 1938

- Lobonychium palpiplus Roewer, 1938 — Borneo

- Metathyreotus Roewer, 1913

- Metathyreotus aborensis Roewer, 1913 — Assam
- Metathyreotus kempi Roewer, 1913 — Assam

- Metepedanulus Roewer, 1913

- Metepedanulus sarasinorum Roewer, 1913 — Sulawesi
- Metepedanulus flaveolus Banks, 1931 — Borneo

- Metepedanus Roewer, 1912

- Metepedanus venator (Roewer, 1911) — Borneo
- Metepedanus accentuatus (Roewer, 1911) — Borneo

- Mosfora Roewer, 1938

- Mosfora silvestrii (Roewer, 1927) — Taiwan

- Nanepedanus Roewer, 1938

- Nanepedanus rufus Roewer, 1938 — Borneo

- Neoepedanus Roewer, 1912

- Neoepedanus fokiensis Roewer, 1912 — China

- Paratakaoia Suzuki, 1985 — Thailand

- Paratakaoia parva Suzuki, 1985
- Paratakaoia minima (Suzuki, 1986) — Thailand

- Parepedanulus Roewer, 1913

- Parepedanulus sarasinorum Roewer, 1913 — Sulawesi
- Parepedanulus bicmaculatus Roewer, 1915

- Plistobunus Pocock, 1903

- Plistobunus rapax Pocock, 1903 — China Hong Kong

- Pseudoepedanus Suzuki, 1969

- Pseudoepedanus dolensis Suzuki, 1970 — Thailand

- Pseudomarthana Hillyard, 1985

- Pseudomarthana conspicua Hillyard, 1985 — Malaysia (Pahang)

- Takaoia Roewer, 1911

- Takaoia kubotai Suzuki, 1982 — Malaysia
- Takaoia sauteri Roewer, 1911 — Taiwan
- Takaoia similis Roewer, 1915 — Taiwan

- Thyreotus Thorell, 1889

- Thyreotus bifasciatus Thorell, 1889 — Myanmar
- Thyreotus bimaculatus Roewer, 1912 — Myanmar

- Toccolus Roewer, 1927

- Toccolus chibai Suzuki, 1976 — Malaysia (Negeri Sembilan)
- Toccolus globitarsis Suzuki, 1969 — Thailand
- Toccolus javanensis Kury, 2008 — Indonesia (Java)
- Toccolus kuryi Zhang & Martens, 2020 — Thailand
- Toccolus minimus Roewer, 1927 — Vietnam ("Tonking")

- Zepedanulus Roewer, 1927

- Zepedanulus alter Roewer, 1963 — Singapore
- Zepedanulus armatipalpus Roewer, 1927 — Malaysia (Malacca)
- Zepedanulus ishikawai Suzuki, 1971 - Japan
- Zepedanulus watanabei Suzuki, 1981 — Thailand

== Acrobuninae ==
- Acrobuninae Roewer, 1912

- Acrobunus Thorell, 1891

- Acrobunus nigropunctatus Thorell, 1891 — Indonesia (Sumatra)
- Acrobunus bifasciatus Thorell, 1911 — Indonesia (Sumatra)
- Acrobunus thorelli Banks, 1931 — Malaysia (Sawawak) [="Borneo"]

- Anacrobunus Roewer, 1927

- Anacrobunus filipes Roewer, 1927 — Indonesia (Riau Islands)
- Anacrobunus palawanensis Suzuki, 1985 — Philippenes (Palawan)

- Harpagonellus Roewer, 1927

- Harpagonellus glaber Roewer, 1927 — Indonesia (Sumatra)

- Heterobiantes Roewer, 1912 ! See Epedaninae

- Heterobiantes geniculatus (Pocock, 1903) — Hong Kong

- Metacrobunus Roewer, 1915

- Metacrobunus macrochelis Roewer, 1915 — Malacca
- Metacrobunus frontalis Banks, 1931 — Borneo

- Paracrobunus Suzuki, 1977

- Paracrobunus bimaculatus Suzuki, 1977
- Paracrobunus similis Suzuki, 1982

== Sarasinicinae ==
- Sarasinicinae Roewer, 1923 — should possibly be a family

- Acanthepedanus Roewer, 1912

- Acanthepedanus armatus Roewer, 1912 — Sumatra

- Albertops Roewer, 1938

- Albertops robustus Roewer, 1938 — Borneo

- Asopella Kury, 2020 (not Sørensen, 1932, contra Hallan)

- Asopella lutescens (Thorell, 1876) — Sarawak (contra Hallan)
- Asopella robusta Suzuki, 1982 — Philippines
- Asopella xanti Sørensen, 1932 — Java

- Delicola Roewer, 1938

- Delicola longipalpis Roewer, 1938 — Sumatra

- Gintingius Roewer, 1938

- Gintingius robustus Roewer, 1938 — Pahang

- Kilungius Roewer, 1915

- Kilungius bimaculatus Roewer, 1915 — Taiwan
- Kilungius insulanus (Hirst, 1911) — Japan?

- Koyanus Roewer, 1938

- Koyanus clarus Roewer, 1938 — Borneo

- Kuchingius Roewer, 1927

- Kuchingius megalopalpus Roewer, 1927 — Borneo

- Nobeoka Roewer, 1938 — Japan

- Nobeoka laevis Roewer, 1938

- Opelytus Roewer, 1927

- Opelytus rugichelis Roewer, 1938 — Borneo
- Opelytus simoni Roewer, 1927 — Malacca
- Opelytus spinichelis Rower, 1938 — Tenasserim
- Opelytus vepretum Roewer, 1927 — Pulu Pinang

- Padangcola Roewer, 1963 — should possibly be in Epedaninae

- Padangcola jacobsoni Roewer, 1963

- Panticola Roewer, 1938 — placement is uncertain

- Panticola elegans Roewer, 1938 — Malacca

- Parepedanus Roewer, 1912

- Parepedanus bispinosus Roewer, 1912 — Sumatra
- Parepedanus bimaculatus Roewer, 1915 — Malacca

- Pasohnus Suzuki, 1976 — was in Phalangodidae

- Pasohnus bispinosus Suzuki, 1976

- Pseudobiantes Hirst, 1911 — Japan

- Pseudobiantes japonicus Hirst, 1911 — Japan
- Pseudobiantes silvestrii (Mello-Leitão, 1944) — nomen novum for P. japonicus

- Punanus Roewer, 1938

- Punanus tenuis Roewer, 1938 — Borneo

- Sarasinica Strand, 1914

- Sarasinica atra Roewer, 1938 — Borneo
- Sarasinica femoralis Roewer, 1938 — Borneo
- Sarasinica tricommata (Roewer, 1913) — Sulawesi

Sarasinica tricommata tricommata (Roewer, 1913)
Sarasinica tricommata quadripunctata Roewer, 1913
Sarasinica tricommata sexpunctata Roewer, 1913

- Sarasinica henrikseni Mello-Leitão, 1944

- Sembilanus Roewer, 1938

- Sembilanus rugichelis Roewer, 1938 — Malacca

- Sinistus Roewer, 1938

- Sinistus maculatus Roewer, 1938 — Borneo
- Sinistus fuscus Roewer, 1938 — Borneo

- Siponnus Roewer, 1927

- Siponnus stimulatus Roewer, 1927 — Pulu Pinang

- Sungsotia Tsurusaki, 1995

- Sungsotia uenoi Tsurusaki, 1995 — Vietnam

- Tegestria Roewer, 1936

- Tegestria borneensis Roewer, 1938 — Borneo
- Tegestria coniata Roewer, 1938 — Malacca
- Tegestria johorea Roewer, 1936 — Malacca
- Tegestria montana Roewer, 1938 — Malaysia: Penang
- Tegestria parva Suzuki, 1970
- Tegestria pinangensis (Roewer 1938) - Malaysia: Penang (contra Hallan)
- Tegestria seriata Roewer, 1938 — Malacca
- Tegestria sumatrana Roewer, 1938 — Sumatra

- Tonkinatus Roewer, 1938 — Tonking

- Tonkinatus bimaculatus Roewer, 1938

== Incertae sedis ==
- 'later = Beloniscidae

- Beloniscellus Roewer, 1912

- Beloniscellus lombokiensis (Roewer, 1912) — Lombok
- Beloniscellus floresianus Roewer, 1931 — Sunda Islands
- Beloniscellus renschi Roewer, 1931 — Sunda Islands
- Beloniscellus sumbawaensis Roewer, 1931 — Sunda Islands
- Beloniscellus parvicalcar Roewer, 1931 — Sunda Islands
- Beloniscellus narmadeus Roewer, 1949 — Indonesia

- Beloniscops Roewer, 1949

- Beloniscops flavicalcar Roewer, 1949 — Indonesia (Sumatra)
- Beloniscops lata Roewer, 1949 — Indonesia (Sumatra)

- Belonisculus Roewer, 1923

- Belonisculus jacobsoni Roewer, 1923 — Simalur Island (Sumatra)

- Beloniscus Thorell, 1891

- Beloniscus albimarginatus Roewer, 1915 — Singapore
- Beloniscus albiephippiatus Roewer, 1916 — Singapore
- Beloniscus albipustulatus Roewer, 1949 — Indonesia (Sumatra)
- Beloniscus biconus Roewer, 1926 — Indonesia (Sumatra) (not Beloniscus bicornis)
- Beloniscus malayanus Roewer, 1949 — Indonesia (Sumatra)
- Beloniscus morosus Thorell, 1891 — Indonesia (Sumatra)
- Beloniscus ochraceus Loman, in Weber 1892 — Indonesia (Sumatra)
- Beloniscus pustulosus Loman, in Weber 1892 — Indonesia (Sumatra)
- Beloniscus quinquespinosus Thorell, 1891 — Indonesia (Sumatra)
- Beloniscus simaluris Roewer, 1923 — Simalur Island
- Beloniscus thienemanni Roewer, 1931 — Sunda Islands
- Beloniscus tricalcaratus Roewer, 1949 — Indonesia (Java)
- Beloniscus tuberculatus Roewer, 1927 — Indonesia (Sumatra)

- Buparellus Roewer, 1949

- Buparellus dibunichelis Roewer, 1949 — Myanamar
- Buparellus insolitus S. Suzuki, 1985 — Thailand
- Buparellus mitylus (Thorell, 1889) — Myanamar
- Buparellus patellaris Roewer, 1949 — Myanamar

- Bupares Thorell, 1889

- Bupares armatus Roewer, 1949 — Myanamar
- Bupares caper Thorell, 1889 — India, Myanamar
- Bupares chelicornis Roewer, 1927 — Thailand
- Bupares degerbolae S. Suzuki, 1985 — Thailand
- Bupares granulatus Thorell, 1890 — Malaysia
- Bupares pachytarsus Roewer, 1933 — Malaysia (many as "1934")
- Bupares stridulator Roewer, 1949 — Myanamar
- Bupares trochanteralis Roewer, 1949 — Myanamar

- Dhaulagirius Martens, 1977 — placement is uncertain

- Dhaulagirius altitudinalis Marten, 1977

- Dumaguetes Roewer, 1927

- Dumaguetes chapmani Roewer, 1927 — Philippines

- Parabeloniscus Suzuki, 1967

- Parabeloniscus caudatus Suzuki, 1973
- Parabeloniscus nipponicus Suzuki, 1967
- Parabeloniscus shimojanai Suzuki, 1971

- Parabupares S. Suzuki, 1982

- Parabupares robustus S. Suzuki, 1982 — Indonesia

- Sotekia S. Suzuki, 1982

- Sotekia minima S. Suzuki, 1982 — Indonesia

- Tithaeus Thorell, 1890

- Tithaeus annandalei Roewer, 1927 — Singapore
- Tithaeus birmanicus Roewer, 1949 — Burma
- Tithaeus borneensis Roewer, 1949 — Borneo
- Tithaeus cruciatus Roewer, 1927 — Sumatra
- Tithaeus drac Lian, Zhu & Kury, 2008 — China
- Tithaeus flavescens Banks, 1931 — Borneo
- Tithaeus fraseri Suzuki, 1972 — Malaysia
- Tithaeus fuscus Roewer, 1949 — Borneo
- Tithaeus granulatus Banks, 1931 — Borneo
- Tithaeus indochinensis Roewer, 1925 — Tonking
- Tithaeus jacobsoni Roewer, 1923 — Sumatra
- Tithaeus javanus Roewer, 1949 — Java
- Tithaeus johorensis Roewer, 1949 — Malaya
- Tithaeus kokutnus S. Suzuki, 1985 — Thailand
- Tithaeus krakatauensis Roewer, 1949 — Indonesia
- Tithaeus laevigatus Thorell, 1890 — Pinang
- Tithaeus lesserti Roewer, 1949 — Borneo
- Tithaeus longipes Banks, 1931 — Borneo
- Tithaeus malakkanus Roewer, 1949 — Staits
- Tithaeus metatarsalis Roewer, 1949 — Malaya
- Tithaeus minor Roewer, 1949 — Singapore
- Tithaeus nigripes Banks, 1931 — Borneo
- Tithaeus pumilio Roewer, 1949 — Sarawak
- Tithaeus rotundus Suzuki, 1970
- Tithaeus rudispina Roewer, 1935 — Malaya
- Tithaeus rudispina Roewer, 1949 — Johore (preoccupied?)
- Tithaeus sarawakensis Roewer, 1912 — Sarawak
- Tithaeus siamensis Roewer, 1949 — Thailand
- Tithaeus similis S. Suzuki, 1985 — Thailand
- Tithaeus tenuis Roewer, 1949 — Johore
- Tithaeus timorensis Roewer, 1949 — Indonesia
- Tithaeus trimaculatus Roewer, 1949 — Indonesia
- Tithaeus vagus (Loman, 1892)
- Tithaeus watanabei Suzuki, 1970b

- Tokunosia Suzuki, 1964

- Tokunosia tenuipes Suzuki, 1964

Tokunosia tenuipes tenuipes Suzuki, 1964
Tokunosia tenuipes tuberuculata Suzuki, 1973
Tokunosia tenuipes taiwana Suzuki, 1977
