= Sitalcicus gardineri =

Conservation status
- Extinct (IUCN 3.1)

Scientific classification
- Kingdom: Animalia
- Phylum: Arthropoda
- Subphylum: Chelicerata
- Class: Arachnida
- Order: Opiliones
- Family: Podoctidae
- Genus: Sitalcicus
- Species: †S. gardineri

Binomial name
- †Sitalcicus gardineri (Hirst, 1911)

Synonyms
- Sitalces gardineri Hirst, 1911

Species of harvestman/daddy longlegs

Sitalcicus gardineri is an allegedly extinct species of harvestmen in the family Podoctidae. The species was endemic to Mahe Island of Seychelles. It has not been found when it was originally described in 1911.
