= Spaeleoleptes =

Scientific classification
- Kingdom: Animalia
- Phylum: Arthropoda
- Subphylum: Chelicerata
- Class: Arachnida
- Order: Opiliones
- Family: Escadabiidae
- Genus: Spaeleoleptes; Soares, 1966

Type species
- Spaeleoleptes spaeleus Soares, 1966

Species
- See text

Diversity
- 2 species

Genus of harvestmen/daddy longlegs

Spaeleoleptes is a genus of harvestmen in the family Escadabiidae with two described species (as of 2024). Both species are found in Brazil as cave endemics.

== Description ==
The genus Spaeleoleptes was described by Hélia Eller Monteiro Soares, 1966 with the type species Spaeleoleptes spaeleus Soares, 1966.

== Species ==
These species belong to the genus Spaeleoleptes:

  - Spaeleoleptes gimli Pereira, Gallão, Bichuette & Pérez-González, 2024 – Brazil (Bahia)
  - Spaeleoleptes spaeleus Soares, 1966 – Brazil (Minas Gerais)

== Etymology ==
The genus is Masculine. It should have been spelled “Spelaeoleptes”, from Greek σπήλαιον (cave, cavern) + truncation of pre-existing genus Gonyleptes (Kury, 2003)
