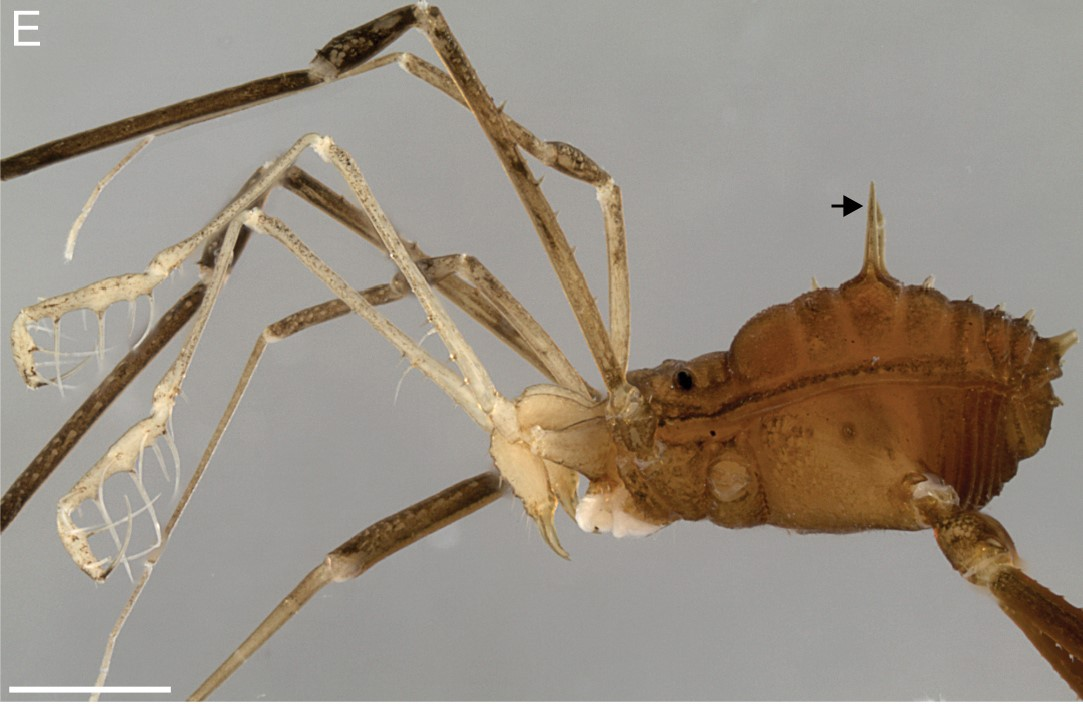
- Metalacurbs foordi

Scientific classification
- Kingdom: Animalia
- Phylum: Arthropoda
- Subphylum: Chelicerata
- Class: Arachnida
- Order: Opiliones
- Family: Biantidae
- Subfamily: Lacurbsinae
- Genus: Metalacurbs; Roewer, 1915

Type species
- Metalacurbs simoni Roewer, 1915

= Metalacurbs =

Genus of arachnids

Metalacurbs is a genus of harvestman in the family Biantidae, found in West Africa.

== Species ==
The following is a list of Metalacurbs species:

- Metalacurbs cornipes (Roewer, 1958)
- Metalacurbs foordi Pérez-González & Mamani, 2024
- Metalacurbs oedipus (Roewer, 1958)
- Metalacurbs simoni Roewer, 1915
- Metalacurbs villiersi (Roewer, 1953)
