= Kimulidae =

Scientific classification
- Domain: Eukaryota
- Kingdom: Animalia
- Phylum: Arthropoda
- Subphylum: Chelicerata
- Class: Arachnida
- Order: Opiliones
- Superfamily: Samooidea
- Family: Kimulidae; Pérez-González, Kury & Alonso-Zarazaga, 2007

Species
- See text for list

Diversity
- c. 10 genera, > 30 species

Synonyms
- Minuidae

Family of harvestmen/daddy longlegs

Kimulidae is a small neotropical family of the harvestman infraorder Grassatores with about thirty described species.

== Description ==
These brown harvestmen dwell in soil and litter.

== Distribution ==
Whereas most species occur in Venezuela, Colombia and the West Indies, the isolated species Tegipiolus pachypus (which was formerly in Zalmoxidae) is found in northeastern Brazil. This species also differs from the others morphologically. Another Brazilian species, Microminua soerenseni Rio de Janeiro, does not belong to this family.

== Relationships ==
Kimulidae are probably closely related to Escadabiidae.

== Name ==
This family was originally called Minuidae, but as the name of the type genus proved invalid, the family name needed a replacement.

== Species ==
- Acanthominua Sørensen, 1932

- Acanthominua tricarinata Sørensen, 1932 — Venezuela

- Euminua Sørensen, 1932

- Euminua brevitarsa Sørensen, 1932 — Venezuela

- Euminuoides Mello-Leitão, 1935

- Euminuoides longitarsa (Sørensen, 1932) — Venezuela

- Fudeci M. A. González-Sponga, 1997

- Fudeci curvifemur González-Sponga, 1997 — Venezuela

- Jimeneziella Avram, 1970 — Cuba

- Jimeneziella decui Avram, 1970
- Jimeneziella negreai Avram, 1970

- Kimula Goodnight & Goodnight, 1942

- Kimula banksi Silhavy, 1969 — Cuba
- Kimula cokendopheri Pérez-González & Armas, 2000 — Dominican Republic
- Kimula elongata Goodnight & Goodnight, 1942 — Puerto Rico
- Kimula goodnightiorum Silhavy, 1969 — Cuba
- Kimula levii Silhavy, 1969 — Cuba
- Kimula tuberculata Goodnight & Goodnight, 1943 — Cuba
- Kimula turquinensis Silhavy, 1969 — Cuba
- Kimula botosaneanui S. Avram, 1973 — Cuba

- Microminua Sørensen, 1932

- Microminua parvula Sørensen, 1932 — Venezuela
- Microminua soerenseni H. E. M. Soares & B. A. Soares, 1954 — Brazil (Rio de Janeiro) (not Kimulidae, probably Gonyleptidae, Tricommatinae)

- Minua Sørensen, 1932 — Venezuela

- Minua barloventensis (M. A. González-Sponga, 1987)
- Minua choroniensis (M. A. González-Sponga, 1987)
- Minua crassa (M. A. González-Sponga, 1987)
- Minua denticulata (M. A. González-Sponga, 1987)
- Minua dimorpha Sørensen, 1932
- Minua elias Sørensen, 1932
- Minua guatopensis (M. A. González-Sponga, 1987)
- Minua montis (M. A. González-Sponga, 1987)
- Minua nebulae (M. A. González-Sponga, 1987)
- Minua parva (M. A. González-Sponga, 1987)
- Minua pinturelensis (M. A. González-Sponga, 1987)
- Minua punctiacuta (M. A. González-Sponga, 1987)
- Minua scabra Sørensen, 1932
- Minua venefica (M. A. González-Sponga, 1987)

- Pseudominua Mello-Leitão, 1933

- Pseudominua convolvulus (Sørensen, 1932) — Venezuela
- Pseudominua peruviana Roewer, 1963 — Peru

- Tegipiolus Roewer, 1949

- Tegipiolus pachypus Roewer, 1949 — Brazil
