= Dongmoa =

Scientific classification
- Domain: Eukaryota
- Kingdom: Animalia
- Phylum: Arthropoda
- Subphylum: Chelicerata
- Class: Arachnida
- Order: Opiliones
- Family: Podoctidae
- Genus: Dongmoa; Roewer, 1927

Species
- Dongmoa oshimensis Suzuki, 1964; Dongmoa silvestrii Roewer, 1927

Genus of harvestmen/daddy longlegs

Dongmoa is a genus of harvestman spiders in the family Podoctidae, with 2 described species.
