= Guayania =

Scientific classification
- Kingdom: Plantae
- Clade: Embryophytes
- Clade: Tracheophytes
- Clade: Spermatophytes
- Clade: Angiosperms
- Clade: Eudicots
- Clade: Asterids
- Order: Asterales
- Family: Asteraceae
- Subfamily: Asteroideae
- Tribe: Eupatorieae
- Genus: Guayania; R.M.King & H.Rob.

Type species
- Eupatorium roupalifolium R.M.King & H.Rob.

Genus of flowering plants

Guayania is a genus of South American flowering plants in the family Asteraceae.

Species include:

- Guayania bulbosa (Aristeg.) R.M.King & H.Rob.
- Guayania cerasifolia (Sch.Bip. ex Baker) R.M.King & H.Rob.
- Guayania crassicaulis (Steyerm.) R.M.King & H.Rob.
- Guayania penninervata (Wurdack) R.M.King & H.Rob.
- Guayania roupalifolia (B.L.Rob.) R.M.King & H.Rob.
- Guayania yaviana (Lasser & Maguire) R.M.King & H.Rob.
