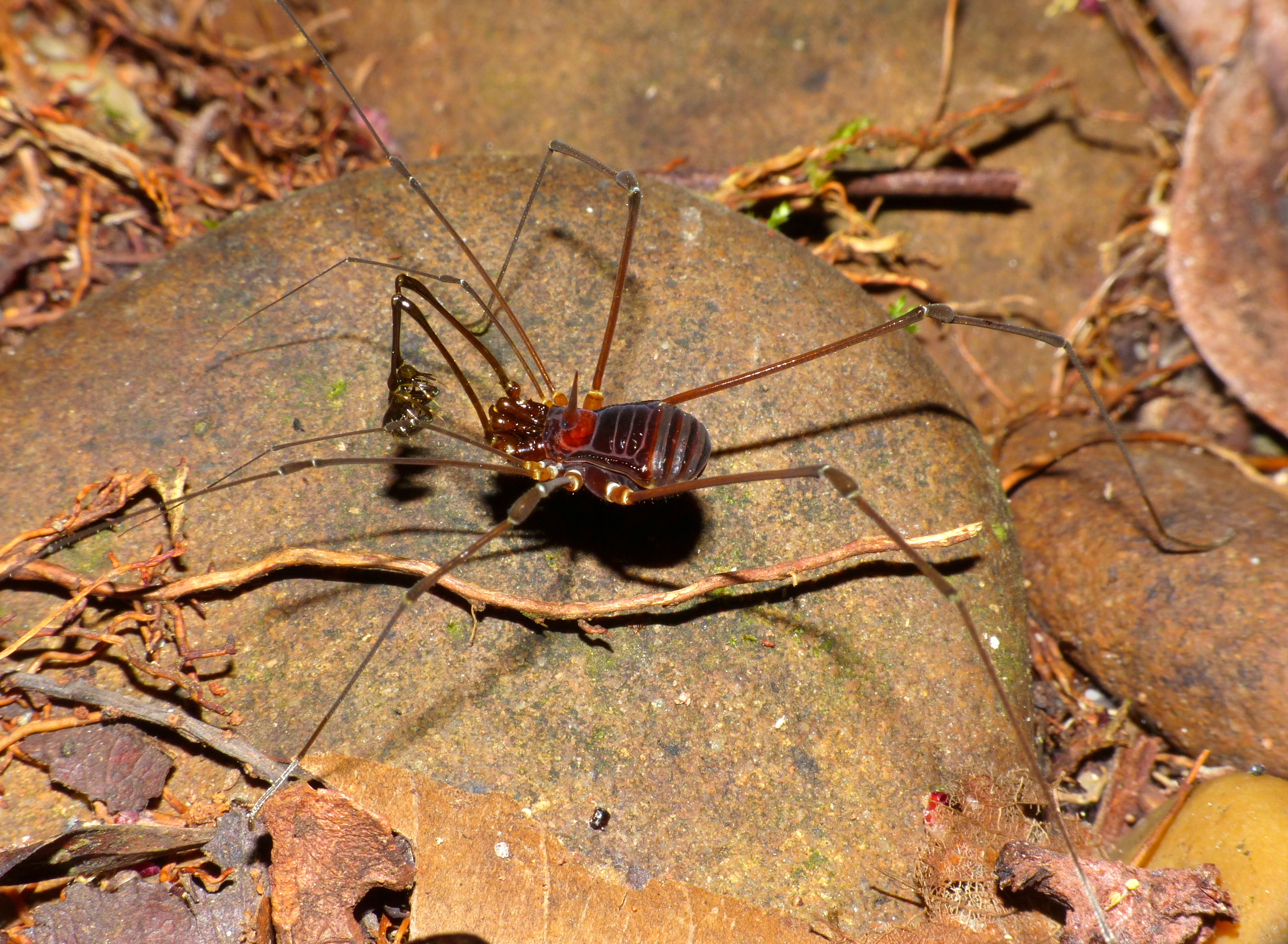
- Unicorn harvestman (Epedanidae)

Scientific classification
- Kingdom: Animalia
- Phylum: Arthropoda
- Subphylum: Chelicerata
- Class: Arachnida
- Order: Opiliones
- Suborder: Laniatores
- Infraorder: Grassatores
- Superfamily: Epedanoidea
- Family: Epedanidae; Sørensen, 1886 [in L. Koch & Keyserling]

Genera
- See text for list

Diversity
- 70 genera, c. 138 species

= Epedanidae =

Epedanidae Temporal range: Cretaceous–present

Family of harvestmen/daddy longlegs

Epedanidae is a family of the harvestman infraorder Grassatores with about 200 described species. They are the sister group of the Gonyleptoidea.

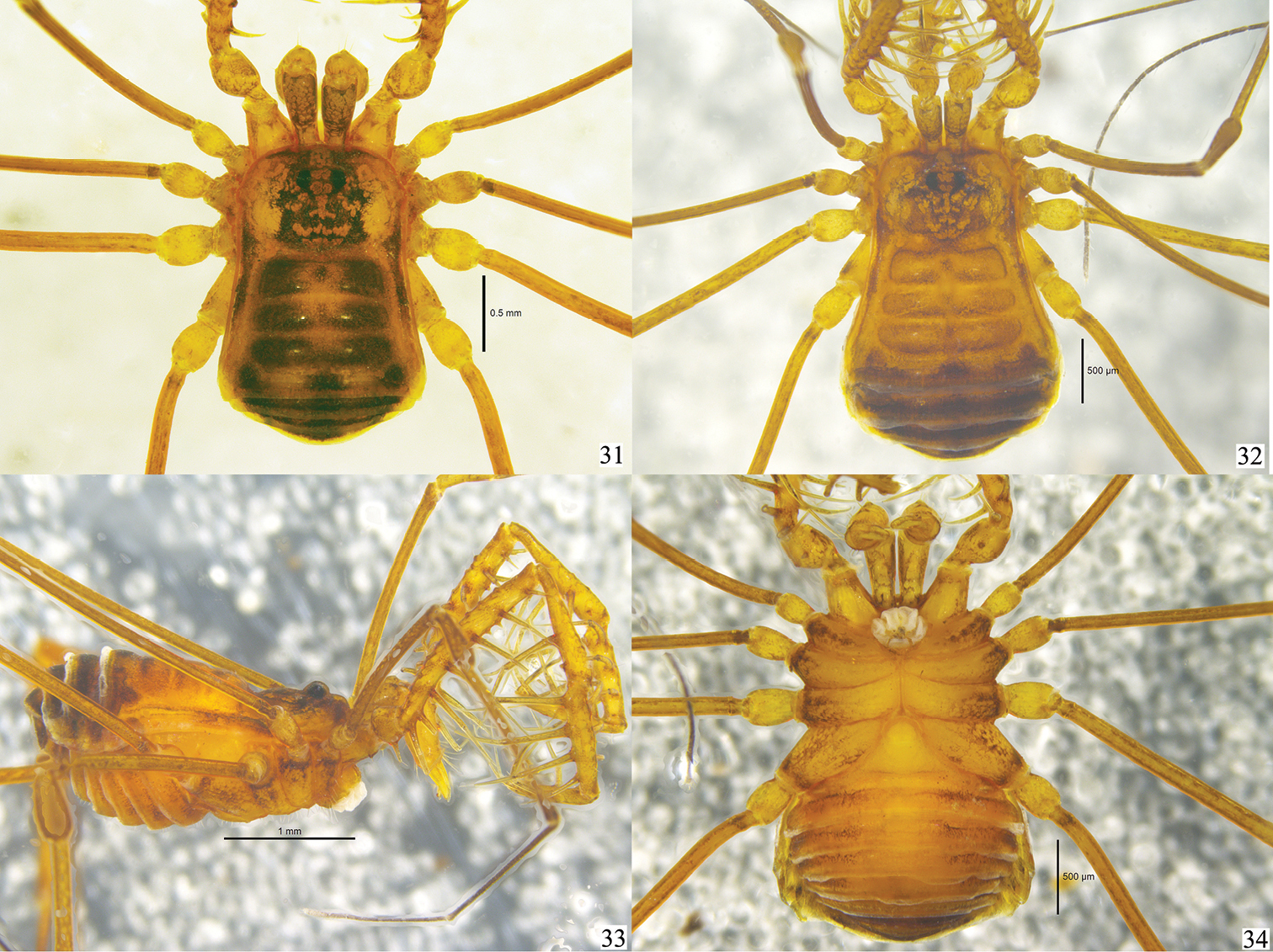
Lobonychium palpiplus

The Epedanidae are endemic to Asia. The subfamily Dibuninae forms the predominant harvestman fauna of the Philippines. The other three subfamilies are more predominant in Indonesia, Malaysia and Thailand, and some are found in Myanmar and Nepal. Some species occur outside this region, in India, China, Vietnam and Japan. One species is even endemic to New Guinea. The oldest fossils of the family are known from the Cenomanian aged Burmese amber of Myanmar.

== Description ==
The body size ranges from two to five millimeters, with thin legs ranging from six to 26 mm. The chelicerae are heavy with strong teeth in both fingers. The pedipalps are long and strong, with powerful spines lining the inside of the claw. Most species are light brown with few black mottling. Some species possess white patches on the scutum. The pedipalps are much more heavily spined in males, together with a swollen cheliceral hand.

== Name ==
The type genus Epedanus is derived from Ancient Greek epedanos "weak, feeble".

== Genera ==
For a list of all currently described species see List of Epedanidae species.

Dibuninae Roewer, 1912

- Dibunus Loman, 1906

Epedaninae Sørensen, in L. Koch 1886

- Alloepedanus Suzuki, 1985
- Balabanus Suzuki, 1977
- Caletor Loman 1892
- Caletorellus Roewer, 1938
- Dino Loman 1892 [in Weber] from Podoctinae).
- Epedanellus Roewer, 1911
- Epedanidus Roewer, 1945
- Epedanulus Roewer, 1913
- Epedanus Thorell, 1876
- Euepedanus Roewer, 1915
- Funkikoa Roewer, 1927
- Heteroepedanus Roewer, 1912
- Aboriscus Roewer, 1940
- Lobonychium Roewer, 1938
- Metathyreotus Roewer, 1913
- Metepedanulus Roewer, 1913
- Metepedanus Roewer, 1912
- Mosfora Roewer, 1938
- Nanepedanus Roewer, 1938
- Neoepedanus Roewer, 1912
- Paratakaoia Suzuki, 1985
- Parepedanulus Roewer, 1913
- Plistobunus Pocock, 1903
- Pseudoepedanus Suzuki, 1969
- Pseudomarthana Hillyard, 1985
- Takaoia Roewer, 1911
- Thyreotus Thorell, 1889
- Toccolus Roewer, 1927
- Zepedanulus Roewer, 1927

Acrobuninae Roewer, 1912

- Acrobunus Thorell, 1891
- Anacrobunus Roewer, 1927
- Harpagonellus Roewer, 1927
- Heterobiantes Roewer, 1912
- Metacrobunus Roewer, 1915
- Paracrobunus Suzuki, 1977

Sarasinicinae Roewer, 1923

- Acanthepedanus Roewer, 1912
- Albertops Roewer, 1938
- Asopella Sørensen, 1932
- Delicola Roewer, 1938
- Gintingius Roewer, 1938
- Kilungius Roewer, 1915
- Koyanus Roewer, 1938
- Kuchingius Roewer, 1927
- Nobeoka Roewer, 1938
- Opelytus Roewer, 1927
- Padangcola Roewer, 1963
- Panticola Roewer, 1938
- Parepedanus Roewer, 1912
- Pasohnus Suzuki, 1976
- Pseudobiantes Hirst, 1911
- Punanus Roewer, 1938
- Sarasinica Strand, 1914
- Sembilanus Roewer, 1938
- Sinistus Roewer, 1938
- Siponnus Roewer, 1927
- Sungsotia Tsurusaki, 1995
- Tegestria Roewer, 1936
- Tonkinatus Roewer, 1938

incertae sedis

- Beloniscellus Roewer, 1912
- Beloniscops Roewer, 1949
- Belonisculus Roewer, 1923
- Beloniscus Thorell, 1891
- Buparellus Roewer, 1949
- Bupares Thorell, 1889
- Dhaulagirius Martens, 1977
- Dumaguetes Roewer, 1927
- Parabeloniscus Suzuki, 1967
- Parabupares S. Suzuki, 1982
- Sotekia S. Suzuki, 1982
- Tithaeus Thorell, 1890
- Tokunosia Suzuki, 1964
- †Petrobunoides Selden et al. 2016 Burmese amber, Myanmar, Cenomanian
- †Biungulus Bartel et al, 2020 Burmese amber, Myanmar, Cenomanian
- †Gigantocheles Bartel et al, 2020 Burmese amber, Myanmar, Cenomanian
