= Zalmoxidae =

Scientific classification
- Kingdom: Animalia
- Phylum: Arthropoda
- Subphylum: Chelicerata
- Class: Arachnida
- Order: Opiliones
- Suborder: Laniatores
- Infraorder: Grassatores
- Superfamily: Zalmoxoidea
- Family: Zalmoxidae; Sørensen, 1886

Genera
- See text

Diversity
- c. 60 genera, > 200 species

Synonyms
- Zalmoxioidae L. Koch, 1886; Stygnoleptinae Soares, 1972; Fissiphalliidae Martens, 1988

Family of harvestmen/daddy longlegs

The Zalmoxidae are a family of harvestmen within the suborder Laniatores.

== Name ==
Zalmoxis is the name of a Dacian god.

== Description ==
Zalmoxidae are small Laniatores of dark brown to dark yellow color with varied darker mottling. Some small edaphic species are pale yellowish. Males of varies species bear sexually dimorphic and embellished armature, particularly in the fourth walking leg.

== Distribution ==
Members of this family are distributed in the tropics on opposite sides of the Pacific Ocean, as well as Melanesian archipelagoes and some Micronesian islands. Zalmoxidae do not occur in mainland Africa or Madagascar. In the Neotropics, most species occur from Costa Rica to Brazil, with a center of diversity in Venezuela. In the Indo-Pacific, many species in New Guinea. Two species are found in the Seychelles and Mauritius.

== Systematics ==
For a list of currently described species, see the List of Zalmoxidae species.

== Relationships ==
Zalmoxidae is sister to Fissiphalliidae, with this clade in turn sister to Icaleptidae. The families Kimulidae, Escadabiidae, and Guasiniidae are the other members of the superfamily Zalmoxoidea.
