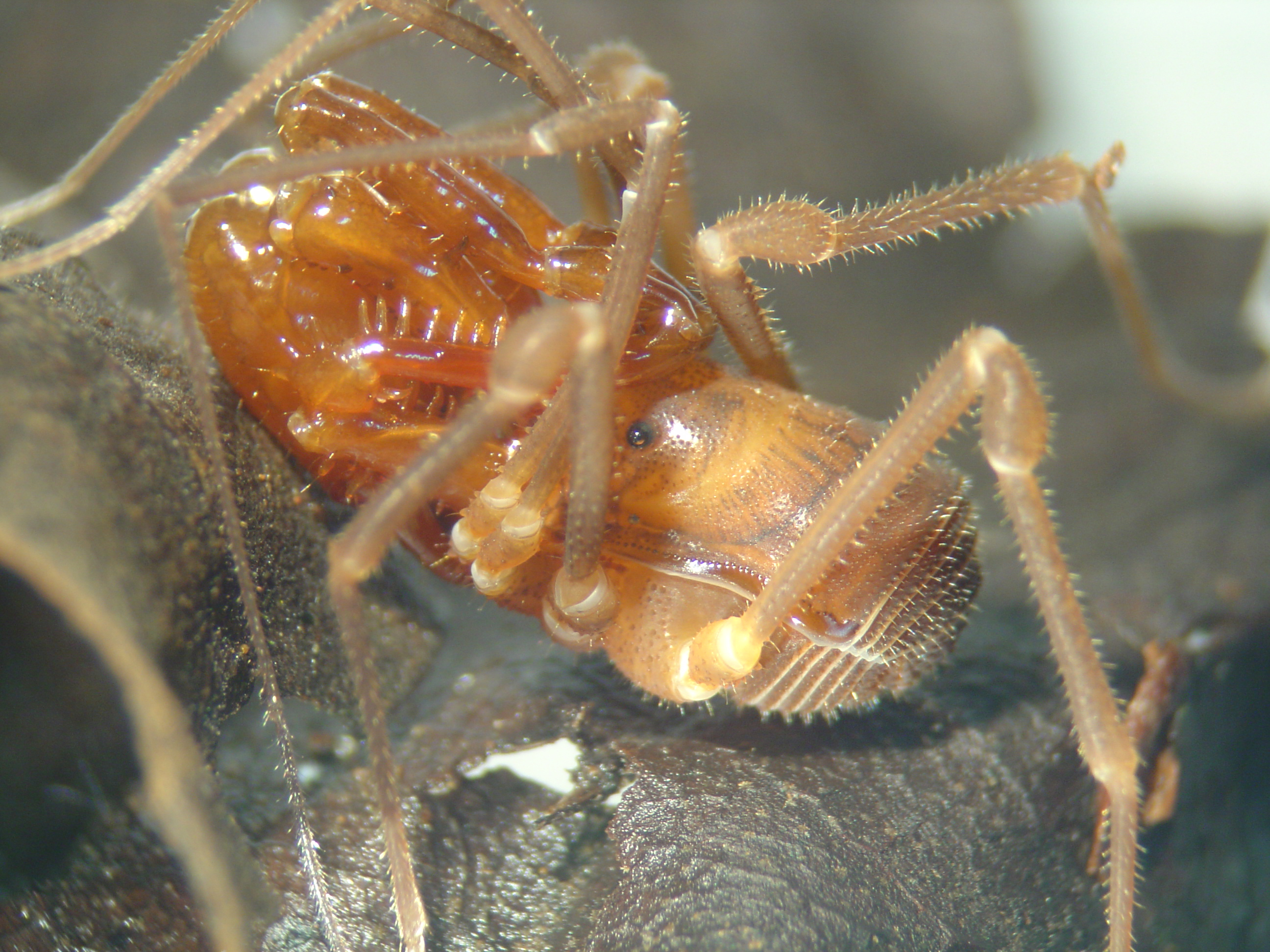
- Stygnomma sp. from Costa Rica

Scientific classification
- Kingdom: Animalia
- Phylum: Arthropoda
- Subphylum: Chelicerata
- Class: Arachnida
- Order: Opiliones
- Family: Stygnommatidae
- Genus: Stygnomma; Roewer, 1912

= Stygnomma =

Genus of harvestmen/daddy longlegs

Stygnomma is a genus of armoured harvestmen in the family Stygnommatidae. There are more than 30 described species in Stygnomma.

== Species ==
These 30 species (of 34 total) belong to the genus Stygnomma:

- Stygnomma annulipes (Goodnight & Goodnight, 1947)
- Stygnomma batatalense González-Sponga, 2005
- Stygnomma belizense Goodnight & Goodnight, 1977
- Stygnomma bispinatum Goodnight & Goodnight, 1953
- Stygnomma cubiroense González-Sponga, 2005
- Stygnomma delicatulum Rambla, 1976
- Stygnomma fiskei Rambla, 1969
- Stygnomma fuentesi González-Sponga, 2005
- Stygnomma fuhrmanni Roewer, 1912
- Stygnomma furvum González-Sponga, 1987
- Stygnomma gracilitibiae González-Sponga, 1987
- Stygnomma granulosum (Goodnight & Goodnight, 1977)
- Stygnomma jajoense González-Sponga, 2005
- Stygnomma joannae Rambla, 1976
- Stygnomma larense González-Sponga, 1987
- Stygnomma leleupi Rambla, 1976
- Stygnomma macrochelae González-Sponga, 2005
- Stygnomma monagasiense Soares & Avram, 1981
- Stygnomma ornatum González-Sponga, 1987
- Stygnomma planum Goodnight & Goodnight, 1953
- Stygnomma purpureum González-Sponga, 1987
- Stygnomma salmeronense González-Sponga, 2005
- Stygnomma solisitiens González-Sponga, 1987
- Stygnomma spiniferum (Packard, 1888)
- Stygnomma spinipalpis Goodnight & Goodnight, 1953
- Stygnomma spinula (Goodnight & Goodnight, 1942)
- Stygnomma teapense Goodnight & Goodnight, 1951
- Stygnomma toledense Goodnight & Goodnight, 1977
- Stygnomma truxillense González-Sponga, 1987
- Stygnomma tuberculatum Goodnight & Goodnight, 1973
