= Holozoster =

Conservation status
- Critically Endangered (IUCN 3.1)

Scientific classification
- Kingdom: Animalia
- Phylum: Arthropoda
- Subphylum: Chelicerata
- Class: Arachnida
- Order: Opiliones
- Family: Podoctidae
- Genus: Holozoster
- Species: H. ovalis

Binomial name
- Holozoster ovalis (Loman, 1902)

Species of harvestman/daddy longlegs

Holozoster ovalis is a species of harvestmen endemic to Mahe Island of Seychelles.
