= Zalmoxis (harvestman) =

Scientific classification
- Kingdom: Animalia
- Phylum: Arthropoda
- Subphylum: Chelicerata
- Class: Arachnida
- Order: Opiliones
- Family: Zalmoxidae
- Genus: Zalmoxis; Sørensen, in L. Koch 1886

Species
- See text

Genus of harvestmen/daddy longlegs

Zalmoxis is a genus of harvestmen, within the Zalmoxidae family. They are found in tropical Australia, Borneo, New Guinea, the Philippines and on Pacific islands.

== Species ==
- Zalmoxis armatus (Roewer, 1949) — New Guinea
- Zalmoxis armatipes Strand, 1910 — New Guinea
- Zalmoxis aspersus Roewer, 1949 — Milgrave I., Torres Strait
- Zalmoxis austerus Hirst, 1912 — New Guinea
- Zalmoxis australis (Sörensen, 1886), (Roewer, 1949) — New Guinea
- Zalmoxis bendis Sharma et al., 2012 — Borneo
- Zalmoxis bonka (Forster, 1949) — Solomon Is.
- Zalmoxis brevipes (Roewer, 1949) — New Guinea
- Zalmoxis cardwellensis Forster, 1955 — Queensland
- Zalmoxis cheesmani (Roewer, 1949) — New Guinea
- Zalmoxis convexus (Roewer, 1949) — New Guinea
- Zalmoxis crassitarsis S. Suzuki, 1982 — Bismarck Archipelago
- Zalmoxis cuspanalis (Roewer, 1926) — Philippines
- Zalmoxis dammermani (Roewer, 1927) — Java
- Zalmoxis darwinensis Goodnight & Goodnight, 1948) — Australia
- Zalmoxis derzelas Sharma et al., 2012 — Philippines
- Zalmoxis falcifer Sharma, 2012 — Queensland
- Zalmoxis furcifer Sharma, 2012 — Queensland
- Zalmoxis gebeleizis Sharma et al., 2012 — Philippines
- Zalmoxis granulatus (Loman, 1902) — Bismarck Archipelago
- Zalmoxis heynemani Suzuki, 1977 — Philippines
- Zalmoxis insula Forster, 1955 — Dauan I., Torres Strait
- Zalmoxis insularis (Roewer, 1949) — Fiji
- Zalmoxis jewetti (Goodnight & Goodnight, 1947) — New Guinea
- Zalmoxis kaiensis S. Suzuki, 1982 — Moluccas
- Zalmoxis kaktinsae Sharma, 2012 — New Caledonia
- Zalmoxis kotys Sharma et al., 2012 — Borneo
- Zalmoxis lavacaverna G. S. Hunt, 1993 — Queensland
- Zalmoxis lavongaiensis (Suzuki, 1985) — New Britain
- Zalmoxis luzonicus Roewer, 1949 — Philippines
- Zalmoxis maculosus (Roewer, 1949) — New Guinea
- Zalmoxis marchei Roewer, 1912 — Marianas
- Zalmoxis mendax Sharma, 2012 — New Caledonia
- Zalmoxis mindanaonica Suzuki, 1977 — Philippines
- Zalmoxis minimus Roewer, 1912 — New Guinea
- Zalmoxis mitobatipes (Roewer, 1926) — Philippines
- Zalmoxis muelleri (Mueller, 1917) — New Guinea
- Zalmoxis mutus (Roewer, 1949) — New Guinea
- Zalmoxis neobritanicus S. Suzuki, 1982 — Bismarck Archipelago
- Zalmoxis neocaledonicus Roewer, 1912 — New Caledonia
- Zalmoxis neoguinensis (Roewer, 1915) — New Guinea
- Zalmoxis occidentalis (Roewer, 1949) — Mauritius
- Zalmoxis pallidus (Roewer, 1915) — New Guinea
- Zalmoxis patellaris (Roewer, 1949) — New Guinea
- Zalmoxis perditus Sharma, 2012 — New Caledonia
- Zalmoxis ponapeus (Roewer, 1949) — Pohnpei, Micronesia
- Zalmoxis princeps Sharma, 2012 — New Caledonia
- Zalmoxis pumilus (Roewer, 1949) — New Guinea
- Zalmoxis pygmaeus Sørensen, in L. Koch 1886 — Fiji
- Zalmoxis remingtoni (Goodnight & Goodnight, 1948) — New Caledonia
- Zalmoxis robustus Sørensen, in L. Koch 1886 — Polynesia
- Zalmoxis sabazios Sharma et al., 2012 — Philippines
- Zalmoxis savesi (Simon, 1880) — New Caledonia
- Zalmoxis sarasinorum Roewer, 1913 — Sulawesi
- Zalmoxis sepikus (Roewer, 1949) — New Guinea
- Zalmoxis similis S. Suzuki, 1982 — Bismarck Archipelago
- Zalmoxis soerenseni Simon, 1892 — Philippines
- Zalmoxis solitarius (Roewer, 1916) — Pohnpei, Micronesia; Jaluit Atoll, Marshall Is.
- Zalmoxis spinicoxa Roewer, 1949 — New Guinea
- Zalmoxis thorelli (Roewer, 1915) — New Guinea
- Zalmoxis tuberculatus Goodnight & Goodnight, 1948 — New Caledonia
- Zalmoxis zibelthiurdos Sharma et al., 2012 — Borneo
