= Fissiphallius =

Scientific classification
- Kingdom: Animalia
- Phylum: Arthropoda
- Subphylum: Chelicerata
- Class: Arachnida
- Order: Opiliones
- Infraorder: Grassatores
- Superfamily: Zalmoxoidea
- Family: Fissiphalliidae; Martens, 1988
- Genus: Fissiphallius; Martens, 1988

Species
- See text

Family of harvestmen/daddy longlegs

The Fissiphalliidae are a small monotypic neotropical family of harvestmen within the suborder Laniatores, superfamily Zalmoxoidea. It contains only the single genus Fissiphallius Martens, 1988 with seven described species (as of 2023). All species are found in the South America.

== Name ==
The name of the type genus is combined from Latin fissus "split" and Ancient Greek phallos "penis".

== Description ==
Fissiphallius are about two to three millimeters long, with legs ranging from three to almost nine mm. The color ranges from yellowish to pale brownish, sometimes with stripes or dots.

== Distribution ==
Fissiphallius have been found in Colombia (e.g. around Bogotá) at elevations of about 3,500 meters, and in lowlands of central and eastern Amazon rainforest.

== Species ==
These species belong to the genus Fissiphallius:

  - Fissiphallius chicoi Tourinho & Perez, 2006 – Brazil (Pará)
  - Fissiphallius martensi Pinto-da-Rocha, 2004 – Brazil (Amazonas)
  - Fissiphallius orube Polydoro & Pinto-da-Rocha, 2012 – Brazil (Acre)
  - Fissiphallius spinulatus Martens, 1988 – Colombia (Cundinamarca)
  - Fissiphallius sturmi Martens, 1988 – Colombia (Cundinamarca)
  - Fissiphallius sympatricus Martens, 1988 – Colombia (Cundinamarca)
  - Fissiphallius tucupi Tourinho & Perez, 2006 – Brazil (Amazonas)

== Relationships ==
Fissiphalliidae could form a monophyletic group with Zalmoxidae, or even be a group within them.
