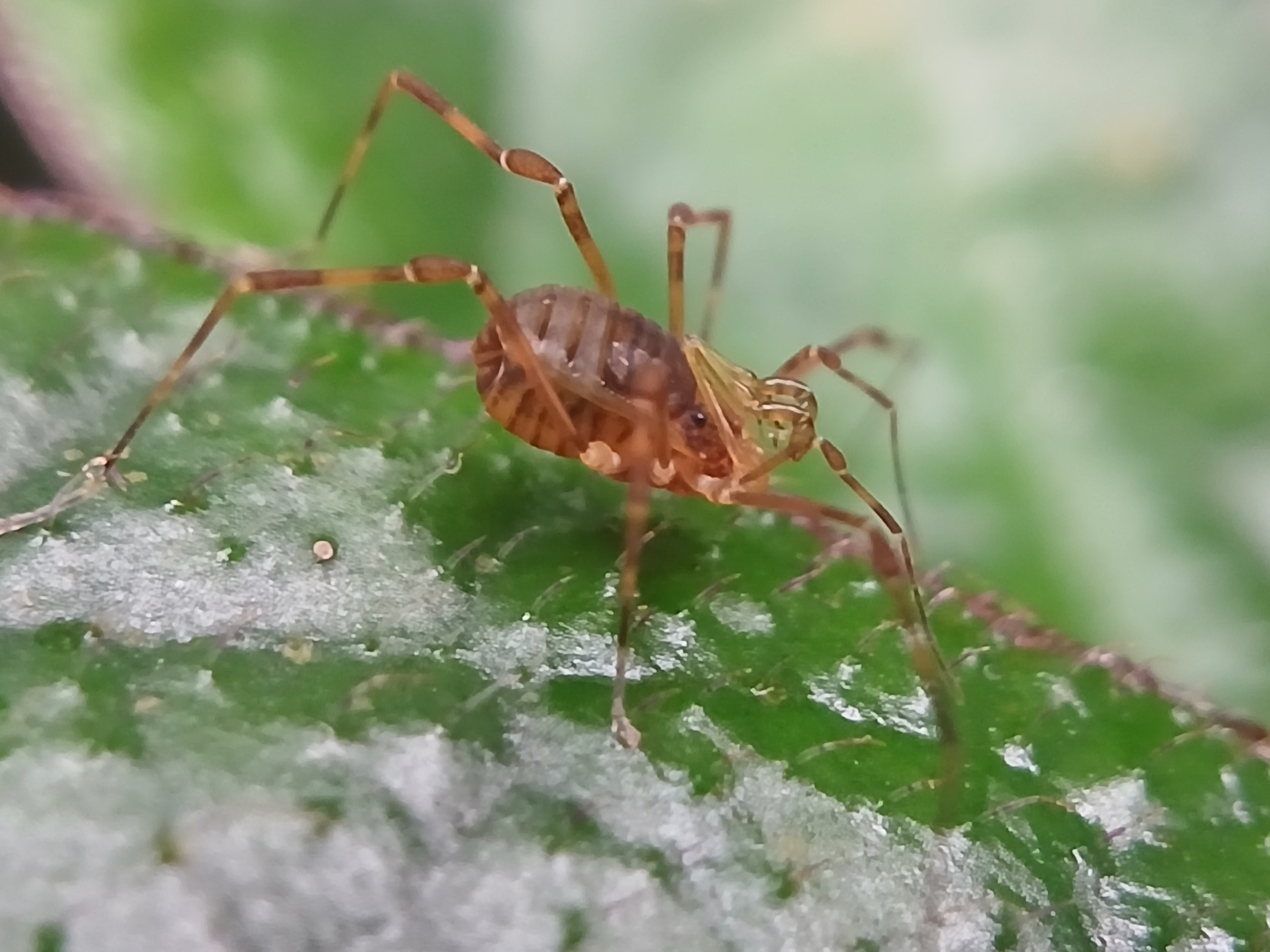
- Image of Biantida

Scientific classification
- Kingdom: Animalia
- Phylum: Arthropoda
- Subphylum: Chelicerata
- Class: Arachnida
- Order: Opiliones
- Suborder: Laniatores
- Infraorder: Grassatores
- Superfamily: Samooidea
- Family: Biantidae; Thorell, 1889

Genera
- See text for list

Diversity
- c. 30 genera, c. 130 species

= Biantidae =

Family of harvestmen/daddy longlegs

Biantidae is a family of the harvestman infraorder Grassatores with about 130 described species.

== Description ==
Biantidae are between 1.5 and 5.5 millimeters long, with legs ranging from three to 25 mm and enlarged, armed pedipalps. Many species are mahogany, many others yellow with dark mottling.

== Distribution ==
Biantidae have radiated greatly on the Indian subcontinent and Madagascar (which was once connected to India), with many other species from mainland Africa. One subfamily however, the Stenostygninae, is found on the West Indies, with one described species from mainland northern South America.

== Relationships ==
Biantidae are included in the superfamily Samooidea, which mainly radiated in South America.

== Name ==
The type genus is named after Biantes, the son of Parthenopaeus, one of the Epigoni who marched against Thebes in Greek mythology.

== Genera ==
For a list of all described species, see the List of Biantidae species.

=== Biantinae ===
- Anaceros Lawrence, 1959 — Madagascar (4 species)
- Biantella Roewer, 1927 — Cameroon (1 species)
- Biantes Simon, 1885 — Nepal, India, Myanmar, Indonesia, Seychelles (30 species)
- Biantessus Roewer, 1949 — South Africa (2 species)
- Biantomma Roewer, 1942 — Equatorial Guinea (Bioko) (1 species)
- Clinobiantes Roewer, 1927 — Cameroon (1 species)
- Cryptobiantes Kauri, 1962 South Africa (1 species)
- Eubiantes Roewer, 1915 — Tanzania (1 species)
- Fageibiantes Roewer, 1949 — Madagascar (2 species)
- Hinzuanius Karsch, 1880 — Madagascar, Socotra, Comoros, Ethiopia (14 species)
- Ivobiantes Lawrence, 1965 — Ivory Coast (1 species)
- Metabiantes Roewer, 1915 — Africa (various countries) (41 species)
- Monobiantes Lawrence, 1962 — Kenya (1 species)
- Probiantes Roewer, 1927 — India (1 species)
- Tetebius Roewer, 1949 — Mozambique (1 species)

=== Lacurbsinae ===
- Eulacurbs Roewer, 1949 — Ghana (1 species)
- Heterolacurbs Roewer, 1912 — Togo (1 species)
- Lacurbs Sørensen, 1896 — Cameroon, Ivory Coast (2 species)
- Metalacurbs Roewer, 1914 — western Africa (4 species)
- Prolacurbs Roewer, 1949 — Ghana (1 species)

=== Stenostygninae ===
- Bidoma Silhavy, 1973 — Haiti (1 species)
- Caribbiantes Silhavy, 1973 — Cuba (3 species)
- Decuella Avram, 1977 — Cuba (1 species)
- Galibrotus Silhavy, 1973 — Cuba (3 species)
- Heterolacurbs Roewer, 1912 — Puerto Rico/U.S. Virgin Islands (2 species, inc. Martibianta Silhavy, 1973) (!After Hallan)
- Manahunca Silhavy, 1973 — Cuba (3 species)
- Negreaella Avram, 1977 — Cuba (5 species)
- Stenostygnus Simon, 1879 — northern South America (1 species)
- Vestitecola Silhavy, 1973 — Haiti (1 species)

=== Zairebiantinae ===
- Zairebiantes H. Kauri, 1985 — Zaire (1 species)
