= Escadabiidae =

Scientific classification
- Domain: Eukaryota
- Kingdom: Animalia
- Phylum: Arthropoda
- Subphylum: Chelicerata
- Class: Arachnida
- Order: Opiliones
- Suborder: Laniatores
- Infraorder: Grassatores
- Superfamily: Zalmoxoidea
- Family: Escadabiidae; Kury & Pérez in Kury, 2003

Species
- See text for list

Diversity
- 6 genera, 9 species

Family of harvestmen/daddy longlegs

Escadabiidae is a small neotropical family of the harvestman infraorder Grassatores with six described species.

== Description ==
Escadabiidae are about three millimeters long, with short legs and weak chelicerae.

== Distribution ==
All known members of this group are endemic to Brazil. The as yet undescribed species in this family expand the range to the coast of Ceará State and caves in the dry central part of Minas Gerais, where the cave-dwelling species could represent an example of relictual distribution.

== Relationships ==
Escadabiidae are possibly the sister group to Kimulidae.

== Name ==
The name of the type genus Escadabius is combined from the type locality Escada (Pernambuco, Brazil) and Ancient Greek bios "living".

== Species ==
These species belong to Escadabiidae:

- Baculigerus Soares, 1979
  - Baculigerus litoris Soares, 1979
- Brotasus Roewer, 1928
  - Brotasus megalobunus Roewer, 1928
- Escadabius Roewer, 1949
  - Escadabius schubarti Roewer, 1949
  - Escadabius spinicoxa Roewer, 1949
  - Escadabius ventricalcaratus Roewer, 1949
- Jim Soares, 1979
  - Jim benignus Soares, 1979
- Recifesius Soares, 1978
  - Recifesius pernambucanus Soares, 1978
- Spaeleoleptes Soares, 1966
  - Spaeleoleptes gimli Pereira, Gallão, Bichuette & Pérez-González, 2024
  - Spaeleoleptes spaeleus Soares, 1966
