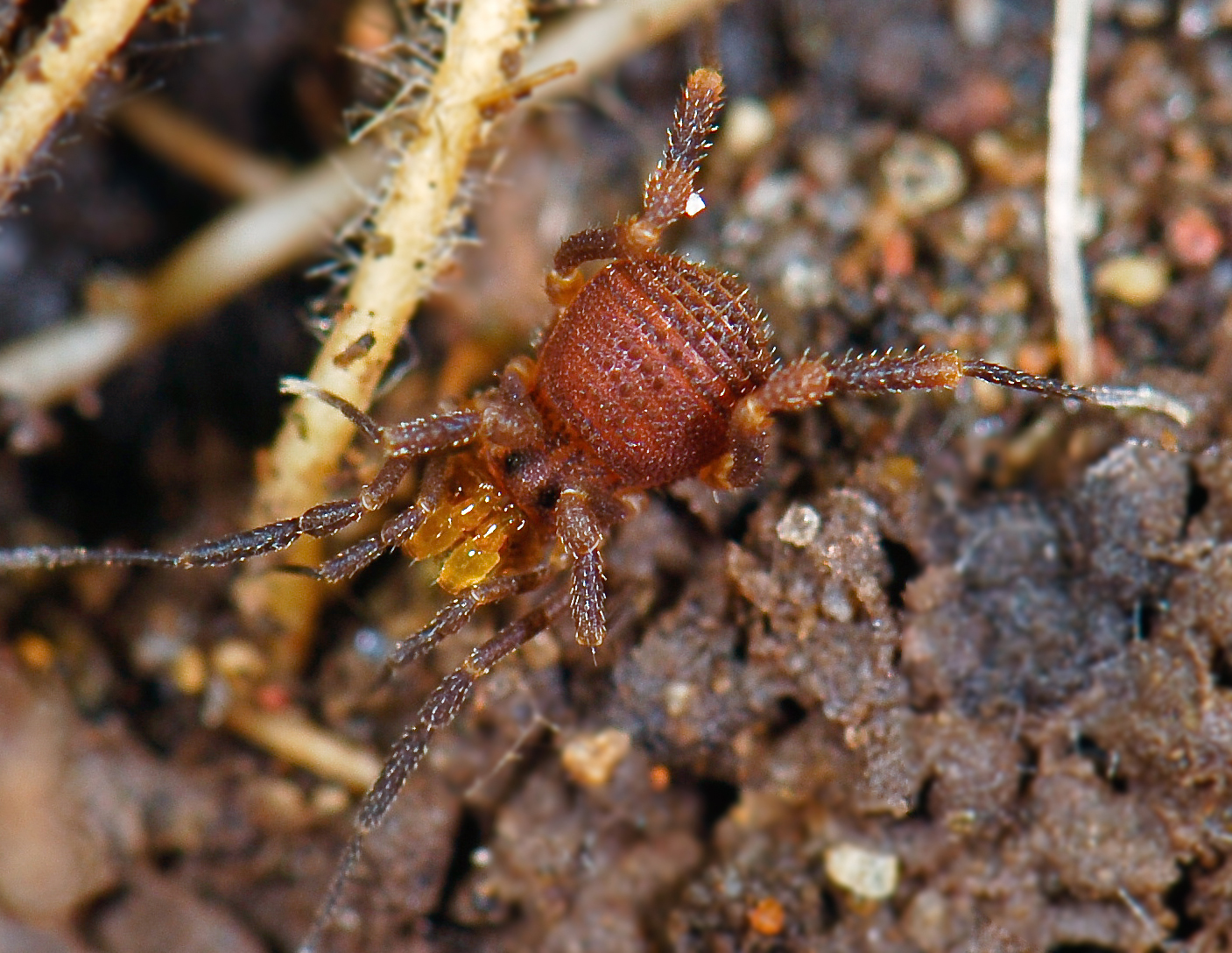
- Pellobunus insularis, female

Scientific classification
- Kingdom: Animalia
- Phylum: Arthropoda
- Subphylum: Chelicerata
- Class: Arachnida
- Order: Opiliones
- Suborder: Laniatores
- Infraorder: Grassatores
- Superfamily: Samooidea
- Family: Samoidae; Sørensen, 1886

Species
- See text

Diversity
- c. 26 genera, c. 50 species

= Samoidae =

Samoidae Temporal range: Neogene–present

Family of harvestmen/daddy longlegs

Samoidae is a family of the harvestman infraorder Grassatores with about fifty described species.

== Description ==
The body length of members of this family ranges from about two to almost six millimeters. They are dull light brown to yellow or green yellow with darker mottling, and sometimes dark brown.

== Distribution ==
Samoidae from Polynesia, Melanesia, Australia, Mexico, the West Indies and Venezuela are all remarkably similar, while the species from Africa, Madagascar, Seychelles and Indonesia do at least in part not belong to this family.

== Relationships ==
The relationship with other families in the Samooidea is not yet understood.

== Name ==
The name of the type genus is derived from the type locality Samoa.

== Species ==
- Akdalima Silhavy, 1977

- Akdalima jamaicana V. Silhavy, 1979 — Jamaica
- Akdalima vomeroi Silhavy, 1977 — Mexico

- Arganotus Silhavy, 1977

- Arganotus macrochelis (Goodnight & Goodnight, 1953) — Mexico
- Arganotus robustus V. Silhavy, 1979 — Haiti
- Arganotus strinatii V. Silhavy, 1979 — Guatemala

- Badessa Sørensen, in L. Koch 1886

- Badessa ampycoides Sørensen, in L. Koch 1886 — Fiji

- Badessania Roewer, 1949

- Badessania metatarsalis Roewer, 1949 — New South Wales

- Benoitinus M. Rambla, 1983

- Benoitinus elegans M. Rambla, 1983 — Seychelles

- Cornigera M. A. González-Sponga, 1987

- Cornigera flava M. A. González-Sponga, 1987 — Venezuela

- Feretrius Simon, 1879

- Feretrius quadrioculatus (L. Koch, 1865) — Samoa

- Fijicolana Roewer, 1963

- Fijicolana tuberculata Roewer, 1963 — Melanesia

- Hovanoceros Lawrence, 1959

- Hovanoceros bison Lawrence, 1959

- Hummelinckiolus V. Silhavy, 1979

- Hummelinckiolus parvus V. Silhavy, 1979 — Leeward Islands (Guadeloupe, Montserrat, St. Kitts, Nevis)
- † Hummelinckiolus silhavyi Cokendolpher & Poinar, 1998 — fossil: Dominican amber

- Kalominua Sørensen, 1932 — Venezuela

- Kalominua alta (M. A. González-Sponga, 1987)
- Kalominua bicolor Sørensen, 1932
- Kalominua bromeliaca (M. A. González-Sponga, 1987)
- Kalominua inermichela (H. E. M. Soares & S. Avram, 1981)
- Kalominua leonensis (M. A. González-Sponga, 1987)
- Kalominua manueli (M. A. González-Sponga, 1987)
- Kalominua minuta (M. A. González-Sponga, 1987)
- Kalominua tiarensis (M. A. González-Sponga, 1987)

- Malgaceros Lawrence, 1959

- Malgaceros boviceps Lawrence, 1959

- Maracaynatum Roewer, 1949

- Maracaynatum cubanum V. Silhavy, 1979 — Cuba
- Maracaynatum linaresi (H. E. M. Soares & S. Avram, 1981) — Venezuela
- Maracaynatum mariaeteresae M. A. González-Sponga, 1987 — Venezuela
- Maracaynatum orchidearum Roewer, 1949 — Venezuela
- Maracaynatum stridulans V. Silhavy, 1979 — Cuba
- Maracaynatum trinidadense V. Silhavy, 1979 — Trinidad

- Microconomma Roewer, 1915

- Microconomma armatipes Roewer, 1915 — Cameroon

- Mitraceras Loman, 1902 — Seychelles

- Mitraceras crassipalpum Loman, 1902
- Mitraceras pulchra M. Rambla, 1983

- Neocynortina Goodnight & Goodnight, 1983

- Neocynortina dixoni Goodnight & Goodnight, 1983 — Costa Rica

- Orsa V. Silhavy, 1979

- Orsa daphne V. Silhavy, 1979 — Haiti

- Parasamoa Goodnight & Goodnight, 1957

- Parasamoa gressitti Goodnight & Goodnight, 1957

- Pellobunus Banks, 1905

- Pellobunus camburalesi M. Rambla, 1978 — Venezuela
- Pellobunus haitiensis (V. Silhavy, 1979) — Haiti
- Pellobunus insularis Banks, 1905 — Costa Rica, Panama
- Pellobunus insulcatus (Roewer, 1954) — El Salvador
- Pellobunus longipalpus Goodnight & Goodnight, 1947 — Trinidad
- Pellobunus mexicanus Goodnight & Goodnight, 1971 — Mexico
- † Pellobunus proavus J. C. Cokendolpher, 1987 — fossil: Dominican amber
- Pellobunus trispinatus Goodnight & Goodnight, 1947 — Trinidad

- Reventula V. Silhavy, 1979

- Reventula amabilis V. Silhavy, 1979 — Jamaica

- Samoa Sørensen, in L. Koch 1886

- Samoa variabilis Sørensen, in L. Koch 1886 — Samoa
- Samoa obscura Sørensen, in L. Koch 1886 — Samoa
- Samoa sechellana M. Rambla, 1983 — Seychelles

- Sawaiellus Roewer, 1949

- Sawaiellus berlandi Roewer, 1949 — Samoa

- Tetebius Roewer, 1949

- Tetebius latibunus Roewer, 1949 — Tete, Mozambique

- Vlachiolus V. Silhavy, 1979

- Vlachiolus vojtechi V. Silhavy, 1979 — Cuba

- Waigeucola Roewer, 1949

- Waigeucola palpalis Roewer, 1949 — Indonesia

Note: for Tetebius Roewer, 1949 see Biantidae: Biantinae, after Kury, & Pérez-González, 2015, contra Staręga, 1992.
