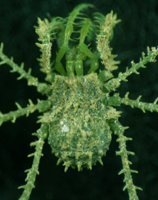
- Undescribed Lomanius from the Philippines

Scientific classification
- Kingdom: Animalia
- Phylum: Arthropoda
- Subphylum: Chelicerata
- Class: Arachnida
- Order: Opiliones
- Suborder: Laniatores
- Infraorder: Grassatores
- Superfamily: Epedanoidea
- Family: Podoctidae; Roewer, 1912

Genera
- See text for list

Diversity
- c. 60 genera, c. 130 species

= Podoctidae =

Podoctidae Temporal range: Cenomanian–Recent

Family of harvestmen/daddy longlegs

Podoctidae is a family of the harvestman infraorder Grassatores with about 130 described species.

== Description ==
Body length ranges from 2.5 to 5 millimeters, with leg length ranging from three to almost thirty mm. While most species are brown to yellow, some are deep green. The legs may be ringed in black and yellow. The penis is uniquely built.

== Distribution ==
Most species occur in Southeast Asia, especially in New Guinea. Others are found in Melanesia, Micronesia, Japan, India and Sri Lanka, Madagascar, the Seychelles and Mauritius, and central Africa. Ibantila cubana was introduced in a botanical garden in Cuba. Although one Podoctidae was described from Brazil in 1938, it was later transferred to Triaenonychidae. The oldest known member of the family is Burmalomanius from the mid-Cretaceous Burmese amber of Myanmar.

== Relationships ==
Although Podoctidae are currently included in Samooidea, and are surely Grassatores, there is no obvious relationship with any family.

== Name ==
The name of the type genus is derived from Ancient Greek podos "foot" and oktis "spine", referring to the ventral row of long spines in femur I.

== Genera ==
A detailed list of included species is HERE, which along with generic list below are derived from (as of mid. 2024) the World Catalog of Opiliones. Older versions were largely from the now defunct Joel Hallan's Biology Catalog.

=== Erecananinae ===
- Erecanana Strand, 1911 — Kenya, Tanzania, etc. (=Sub-Saharan Africa), inc. Madagascar, Réunion (9 species)
- Iyonus Suzuki, 1964 — Japan (1 species)
- Lomanius Roewer, 1923 — China, Malaysia, Indonesia (Java), Philippines, Taiwan, Vietnam (7 species)
- Paralomanius Goodnight & Goodnight, 1948 — Philippines, Palau (2 species)
- Strandibalonius Roewer, 1912 — Indonesia (Borneo, Sulawesi), Papua New Guinea, Micronesia, Melanesia (16 species)

=== Ibaloniinae ===
- Asproleria Roewer, 1949 — New Guinea (1 species)
- Austribalonius Forster, 1955 — Australia (1 species)
- Ceylonositalces Özdikmen, 2006 — Sri Lanka (1 species) [Replacement name for Eusitalces Roewer, 1915]
- Gargenna Roewer, 1949 — Indonesia (Nusa Tenggara Barat) (1 species)
- Heteroibalonius Goodnight & Goodnight, 1947 — Indonesia (Papua) (1 species)
- Heteropodoctis Roewer, 1912 — Papua New Guinea/Indonesia (South Papua) (1 species)
- Holozoster Loman, 1902 — Seychelles (1 species)
- Ibalonianus Roewer, 1923 — Papua New Guinea, Indonesia (Papua Barat), (Maluku Islands) (4 species)
- Ibalonius Karsch, 1880 — Philippines, New Caledonia, Seychelles, New Guinea, Solomons (16 species)
- Leytpodoctis Martens, 1993 — Philippines (1 species)
- Orobunus Goodnight & Goodnight, 1947 — Papua New Guinea, Indonesia (Papua) (1 species)
- Paramesoceras Roewer, 1915 — Papua New Guinea (1 species)
- Pentacros Roewer, 1949 — Indonesia (1 species)
- Podoctinus Roewer, 1923 — Papua New Guinea (1 species)
- Proholozoster Roewer, 1915 — Papua New Guinea (1 species)
- Santobius Roewer, 1949 — Melanesia (4 species) [see also Ibantila Silhavy, 1969 for Santobius cubanus — Cuba (introduced)]
- Sitalcicus Roewer, 1923 — Seychelles (3 species)
- Waigeucola Roewer, 1949 — Indonesia (1 species)

=== Podoctinae ===
- Baramella Roewer, 1949 — Malaysia (Sarawak) (1 species)
- Baramia Hirst, 1912 — Brunei, Malaysia (Sarawak), Indonesia (Kalimantan) (5 species)
- Baso Roewer, 1923 — Indonesia (Sumatra) (1 species)
- Basoides Roewer, 1949 — Indonesia (Sumatra) (1 species)
- Bistota Roewer, 1927 — India (1 species)
- Bonea Roewer, 1913 — Indonesia, Philippines (10 species) [Note: Previously in Ibaloniinae]
- Borneojapetus Özdikmen, 2006 — Indonesia/Malaysia ("Borneo") (1 species) [Replacement for Japetus Roewer, 1949]
- Centrobunus Loman, 1902 — Seychelles (1 species)
- Dongmoa Roewer, 1927 — Japan, Vietnam (2 species)
- Eupodoctis Roewer, 1923 — India, Sri Lanka (2 species)
- Eurytromma Roewer, 1949 — Sri Lanka (1 species)
- Gaditusa Roewer, 1949 — Borneo (1 species)
- Hoplodino Roewer, 1915 — Indonesia, Singapore (4 species)
- Idjena Roewer, 1927 — Indonesia (Java) (1 species)
- Idzubius Roewer, 1949 — Japan (1 species)
- Laponcea Roewer, 1936 — Mauritius (1 species)
- Lejokus Roewer, 1949 — Malaysia (Sarawak) (1 species)
- Lundulla Roewer, 1927 — Malaysia (Sarawak) (1 species)
- Metapodoctis Roewer, 1915 — Taiwan, Thailand (2 species)
- Neopodoctis Roewer, 1912 — Sri Lanka (2 species)
- Oppodoctis Roewer, 1927 — Philippines (1 species)
- Peromona Roewer, 1949 — Seychelles (1 species)
- Podoctellus Roewer, 1949 — Malaysia (Johore) (1 species)
- Podoctis Thorell, 1890 — Malaysia (Pinang) (1 species)
- Podoctomma Roewer, 1949 — Indonesia (Java) (1 species)
- Podoctops Roewer, 1949 — Indonesia (Sumatra) (1 species)
- Pumbaraius Roewer, 1927 — India (2 species)
- Sibolgia Roewer, 1923 — Indonesia (Sumatra) (1 species)
- Stobitus Roewer, 1949 — Malaysia (1 species)
- Tandikudius Roewer, 1929 — India (1 species)
- Trencona Roewer, 1949 — — Indonesia/Malaysia ("Borneo") (1 species)
- Trigonobunus Loman, 1894 — Indonesia (West Kalimantan) (1 species)
- Tryssetus Roewer, 1936 — Mauritius (1 species)
- Vandaravua Roewer, 1929 — India (1 species)

== Footnotes ==
For Dino Loman 1892 [in Weber] see Epedanidae. For Japetus Roewer, 1949 see above under Borneojapetus Özdikmen, 2006.
