= List of Stygnidae species =

This is a list of the described species of the harvestman family Stygnidae. The data is taken from Joel Hallan's Biology Catalog.

== Heterostygninae ==
Heterostygninae Roewer, 1913

- Eutimesius Roewer, 1913

- Eutimesius albicinctus (Roewer, 1915) — Venezuela
- Eutimesius ephippiatus (Roewer, 1915) — Colombia
- Eutimesius ornatus (Roewer, 1943) — Colombia, Venezuela
- Eutimesius simoni Roewer, 1913 — Brazil, Colombia, Ecuador, Peru

- Imeri Pinto-da-Rocha & Tourinho, 2012 (! after Hallan)

- Imeri ajuba Coronato-Ribeiro, Pinto-da-Rocha & Rheims, 2013 — Brazil (Amazonas)
- Imeri lomanhungae Pinto-da-Rocha & Tourinho, 2012 — Brazil (Amazonas)

- Innoxius Pinto-da-Rocha, 1997

- Innoxius magnus (Caporiacco, 1951) — Venezuela

- Minax Pinto-da-Rocha, 1997

- Minax tetraspinosus Pinto-da-Rocha, 1997 — Venezuela

- Stenostygnellus Roewer, 1913

- Stenostygnellus flavolimbatus Roewer, 1913 — Venezuela
- Stenostygnellus macrochelis (Roewer, 1917) — Venezuela

- Stygnidius Simon, 1879

- Stygnidius guerinii Sørensen, 1932 — French Guayana
- Stygnidius inflatus (Guérin-Méneville, 1829-1843) — Brazil, Venezuela, French Guiana

- Stygnoplus Simon, 1879

- Stygnoplus antiguanus (Roewer, 1943) — Leeward Islands, Antigua
- Stygnoplus biguttatus Pinto-da-Rocha, 1997 — Venezuela
- Stygnoplus clavotibialis (Goodnight & Goodnight, 1947) — Trinidad
- Stygnoplus flavitarsis (Simon, 1879) — Leeward Islands, Guadeloupe
- Stygnoplus forcipatus (C.L. Koch, 1845) — Colombia
- Stygnoplus granulosus Mello-Leitão, 1940 — Venezuela
- Stygnoplus longipalpus (Goodnight & Goodnight, 1942) — Guyana
- Stygnoplus meinerti Sørensen, 1932 — Venezuela
- Stygnoplus triacanthus (C.L. Koch, 1839) — South America
- Stygnoplus tuberculatus (Goodnight & Goodnight, 1942) — Dominica (plus synonym Stygnoplus dominicanus (Roewer, 1943) per Pérez-González, 2000, after Hallan).

- Timesius Simon, 1879

- Timesius vesicularis (Gervais, 1844) — Colombia

- Yapacana Pinto-da-Rocha, 1997

- Yapacana tibialis (Pinto-da-Rocha, 1997) — Venezuela

== Stygninae ==
Stygninae Simon, 1879

- Actinostygnoides Goodnight & Goodnight, 1942

- Actinostygnoides carus Goodnight & Goodnight, 1942 — Guyana

- Auranus Mello-Leitão, 1941

- Auranus hoeferscovitorum Pinto-da-Rocha, 1997 — Brazil
- Auranus parvus Mello-Leitão, 1941 — Brazil

- Fortia Villarreal et al., 2022 (! after Hallan)

- Fortia jedi Villarreal et al., 2022 — Colombia
- Fortia sith Villarreal et al., 2022 — Colombia

- Iguarassua Roewer, 1943

- Iguarassua schubarti Roewer, 1943 — Brazil

- Jabbastygnus Kury & Villarreal, 2015 (! after Hallan)

- Jabbastygnus huttorum Kury & Villarreal, 2015 — Colombia (Boyacá)

- Kaapora Pinto-da-Rocha, 1997

- Kaapora minutissimus (Roewer, 1943) — Brazil

- Metaphareus Roewer, 1912

- Metaphareus albimanus Roewer, 1912 — Colombia
- Metaphareus punctatus Roewer, 1913 — Venezuela

- Niceforoiellus Mello-Leitão, 1941

- Niceforoiellus assimilis Mello-Leitão, 1941 — Colombia

- Obidosus Roewer, 1931 (! after Hallan, genus restored per Villarreal et al. 2019)

- Obidosus albilineatus Roewer, 1957 — Peru, Ecuador, Brazil (Amazonas)
- Obidosus amigos (Ochoa & Pinto-da-Rocha, 2013) — Peru
- Obidosus amplichelis Roewer, 1931 — Brazil (Amazonas)
- Obidosus apiacas (Pinto-da-Rocha, 2000) — Brazil (Mato Grosso)
- Obidosus bahiensis (Pinto-da-Rocha & Villarreal, 2009) — Brazil (Bahía)
- Obidosus boibumba (Villarreal & Pinto-da-Rocha, 2006) — Brazil (Acre), Peru
- Obidosus carnaval (Villarreal & Pinto-da-Rocha, 2006) — Brazil (Acre), Colombia (Amazonas)
- Obidosus cirio (Villarreal & Pinto-da-Rocha, 2006) — Brazil (Pará)
- Obidosus coxalis (Roewer, 1931) — Brazil (Amazonas)
- Obidosus evelineae (Soares & Soares, 1978) — Brazil (Pará)
- Obidosus foliadereis (Villarreal & Pinto-da-Rocha, 2006) — Brazil (Mato Grosso)
- Obidosus jirau (Bragagnolo, 2013) — Brazil (Rondonia)
- Obidosus junina (Villarreal & Pinto-da-Rocha, 2006) — Brazil (Bahía)
- Obidosus kakinte (Ochoa & Pinto-da-Rocha, 2013) — Peru
- Obidosus laevis (Sørensen, 1932) — Brazil (Pará, Matto Grosso)
- Obidosus longipalpis (Roewer, 1943) — Brazil (Amazonas)
- Obidosus machiguenga (Ochoa & Pinto-da-Rocha, 2013) — Peru
- Obidosus mendopictus (Soares, 1978) — Brazil (Bahía)
- Obidosus osvaldoi (Kury & Pinto-da-Rocha, 2008) — Brazil (Espírito Santo)
- Obidosus palpalis (Roewer, 1931) — Brazil (Amazonas)
- Obidosus regalo (Bragagnolo, 2013) — Brazil (Tocantins)
- Obidosus trocaraincola (Pinto-da-Rocha, 1997) — Brazil (Pará)

- Ortonia Wood, 1869

- Ortonia ferox Wood, 1869 — Ecuador

- Paraphareus Goodnight & Goodnight, 1943

- Paraphareus tatei Goodnight & Goodnight, 1943 — Guyana/Venezuela (Bolívar: Monte Roraima)

- Phareus Simon, 1879 (! revised after Hallan)

- Phareus antrophilus Villarreal & Rodríguez-T, 2006 — Colombia
- Phareus raptator (Gervais, 1844) — Colombia, Venezuela

- Pickeliana Mello-Leitão, 1932 (! revised after Hallan)

- Pickeliana albimaculata Hara & Pinto-da-Rocha, 2008
- Pickeliana capito (Soares & Soares, 1974)
- Pickeliana pickeli Mello-Leitão, 1932 — Brazil

- Planophareus Goodnight & Goodnight, 1943

- Planophareus pallidus Goodnight & Goodnight, 1943 — Monte Roraima, Brazil

- Protimesius Roewer, 1913 (! revised after Hallan)

- Protimesius gracilis Roewer, 1913 — Brazil (Amapá), Suriname, French Guiana
- Protimesius lucifer Villarreal, Ázara & Kury, 2019 — Brazil (Pará)
- Protimesius orcus Villarreal, Ázara & Kury, 2019 — Brazil (Ceará)

- Ricstygnus Kury, 2009 (! after Hallan)

- Ricstygnus quineti Kury, 2009 — Brazil (Ceará)

- Sickesia Soares, 1979

- Sickesia helmuti Soares, 1979 — Brazil

- Stenophareus Goodnight & Goodnight, 1943

- Stenophareus roraimus Goodnight & Goodnight, 1943 — Roraima, Brazil

- Stenostygnoides Roewer, 1913

- Stenostygnoides cosmetitarsus Roewer, 1913 — Surinam

- Stygnus Perty, 1833

- Stygnus aggerum Sørensen, 1932 — Venezuela
- Stygnus armatus Perty, 1833 — Brazil
- Stygnus brevispinis Pinto-da-Rocha, 1997 — Bolivia
- Stygnus ferrugineus (Perty, 1833) — Brazil, French Guiana
- Stygnus gertschi (Roewer, 1963) — Colombia
- Stygnus grasshoffi Pinto-da-Rocha, 1997 — Venezuela
- Stygnus klugi (Goodnight & Goodnight, 1943) — Peru
- Stygnus lesserti (Roewer, 1943) — Brazil
- Stygnus luteus (Mello-Leitão, 1931) — Brazil
- Stygnus marthae Pinto-da-Rocha, 1997 — Brazil
- Stygnus mediocris (Roewer, 1931) — Ecuador
- Stygnus multispinosus (Piza, 1938) — Brazil
- Stygnus pectinipes (Roewer, 1943) — Surinam, Brazil, Colombia
- Stygnus peruvianus (Roewer, 1957) — Peru
- Stygnus polyacanthus (Mello-Leitão, 1923) — Brazil
- Stygnus simonis Sørensen, 1932 — Peru
- Stygnus simplex (Roewer, 1913) — Ecuador, Colombia, Peru
- Stygnus weyrauchi (Roewer, 1963) — Peru

- Verrucastygnus Pinto-da-Rocha, 1997

- Verrucastygnus caliginosus (R. Pinto-da-Rocha, 1990) — Brazil

== incertae sedis ==
incertae sedis

- Gaibulus Roewer, 1943

- Gaibulus schubarti Roewer, 1943 — Brazil

=== Since excluded ===
Subsequently transferred are former Stygnidae: Nomoclastinae Roewer, 1943

- Nomoclastes Sørensen, 1932

- Nomoclastes quasimodo Pinto-da-Rocha, 1997 — Colombia
- Nomoclastes taedifer Sørensen, 1932 — Colombia

Moved to => Nomoclastidae Roewer, 1943
