= List of Cranaidae species =

This is a partial list of the described species of the harvestman family Cranaidae. The data is taken from Joel Hallan's Biology Catalog.

== Cranainae ==
Cranainae Roewer, 1913

- Atonocranaus Mello-Leitão, 1935
- Aguaytiella Goodnight & Goodnight, 1943

- Aguaytiella maculata Goodnight & Goodnight, 1943 — Peru

- Alausius Roewer, 1932

- Alausius mirus Roewer, 1932 — Ecuador

- Allocranaus Roewer, 1915

- Allocranaus colombianus Roewer, 1915 — Colombia

- Angistrisoma Roewer, 1932

- Angistrisoma atrolutea Roewer, 1932 — Ecuador
- Angistrisoma fusca Roewer, 1932 — Ecuador

- Angistrius Roewer, 1932

- Angistrius abnormis Roewer, 1932 — Ecuador

- Aucayacuella S. Avram & H. E. M. Soares, 1983

- Aucayacuella bordoni S. Avram, 1983 — Peru

- Balzabamba Mello-Leitão, 1945

- Balzabamba marmorata Mello-Leitão, 1945 — Ecuador

- Baustomus Roewer, 1932

- Baustomus macrospina Roewer, 1932 — Ecuador

- Bucayana Mello-Leitão, 1942

- Bucayana bucayana Mello-Leitão, 1942 — Ecuador

- Bunicranaus Roewer, 1913

- Bunicranaus simoni Roewer, 1913 — Ecuador

- Callcosma Roewer, 1932

- Callcosma gracilima Roewer, 1932 — Ecuador

- Carsevennia Roewer, 1913

- Carsevennia crassipalpis Roewer, 1913 — French Guiana

- Cayabeus Roewer, 1932

- Cayabeus perlatus Roewer, 1932 — Ecuador

- Cenipa Goodnight & Goodnight, 1943

- Cenipa nubila Goodnight & Goodnight, 1943 — Peru

- Chetronus Roewer, 1932

- Chetronus spiniger Roewer, 1932 — Ecuador

- Clinocippus Roewer, 1932

- Clinocippus albater Roewer, 1932 — Ecuador

- Comboyus Roewer, 1943

- Comboyus albilineatus Roewer, 1943 — Panama

- Cranaus Simon, 1879

- Cranaus albipustulatus Roewer, 1943 — Colombia
- Cranaus bilunatus Roewer, 1913 — Ecuador
- Cranaus chlorogaster (Gervais, 1844) — Colombia
- Cranaus cinnamomeus (Gervais, 1844) — Colombia
- Cranaus filipes (Roewer, 1917) — Ecuador
- Cranaus flaviaculeatus (Caporiacco, 1951) — Venezuela
- Cranaus hickmanni (Caporiacco, 1951) — Venezuela
- Cranaus injucundus (Wood, 1869) — Ecuador
- Cranaus praedo (Wood, 1869) — Ecuador
- Cranaus spinipalpus (Wood, 1869) — Ecuador

- Deriacrus Roewer, 1932

- Deriacrus marginatus Roewer, 1963 — Colombia
- Deriacrus simoni Roewer, 1932 — Colombia, Ecuador

- Digalistes Roewer, 1932

- Digalistes signata Roewer, 1932 — Brazil

- Diptyonius Roewer, 1932

- Diptyonius striatus Roewer, 1932 — Ecuador

- Eucranaus Roewer, 1913

- Eucranaus fuscus (Roewer, 1932) — Venezuela
- Eucranaus reticulatus Roewer, 1913 — Ecuador
- Eucranaus tenuipes (Roewer, 1959) — Ecuador

- Guayaquiliana Mello-Leitão, 1935

- Guayaquiliana camposi Mello-Leitão, 1935 — Ecuador

- Holocranaus Roewer, 1913

- Holocranaus albimarginis Goodnight & Goodnight, 1943 — Peru
- Holocranaus angulus Roewer, 1932 — Ecuador
- Holocranaus bordoni (Avram & Soares, 1979) — Venezuela
- Holocranaus calcar (Roewer, 1912) — Colombia
- Holocranaus calus (Goodnight & Goodnight, 1944) — Colombia
- Holocranaus conspicuus Roewer, 1932 — Ecuador
- Holocranaus laevifrons Roewer, 1917 — Ecuador
- Holocranaus longipes Roewer, 1913 — Colombia
- Holocranaus luteimarginatus Roewer, 1917 — Ecuador
- Holocranaus pectinitibialis (Roewer, 1914) — Colombia
- Holocranaus rugosus Roewer, 1932 — Ecuador
- Holocranaus simplex Roewer, 1913 — Colombia

- Homocranaus Roewer, 1915

- Homocranaus tetracalcar Roewer, 1915 — Colombia

- Idomenta Roewer, 1932

- Idomenta luteipalpis Roewer, 1932 — Brazil

- Isocranaus Roewer, 1915

- Isocranaus gorgonae Hirst, 1926 — Colombia
- Isocranaus obscurus Roewer, 1915 — Colombia, Ecuador
- Isocranaus reticulatus Roewer, 1959 — Ecuador
- Isocranaus umbraticus Roewer, 1959 — Ecuador

- Kendima Roewer, 1932

- Kendima albiornata Roewer, 1932 — Ecuador

- Ladantola Roewer, 1932

- Ladantola aspersa (Roewer, 1932) — Brazil

- Mecritta Roewer, 1932

- Mecritta filipes Roewer, 1932 — Brazil

- Megacranaus Roewer, 1913

- Megacranaus areolatus Roewer, 1932 — Colombia
- Megacranaus pygoplus Roewer, 1913 — Colombia

- Metacranaus Roewer, 1913

- Metacranaus tricalcaris Roewer, 1913 — Colombia

- Microcranaus Roewer, 1913

- Microcranaus colombianus Roewer, 1963 — Colombia
- Microcranaus pustulatus Roewer, 1913 — Ecuador

- Neocranaus Roewer, 1913

- Neocranaus albiconspersus Roewer, 1913 — Venezuela
- Neocranaus armatissimus (Mello-Leitão, 1941) —Colombia
- Neocranaus dybasi (Goodnight & Goodnight, 1947) — Colombia

- Panalus Goodnight & Goodnight, 1947

- Panalus robustus Goodnight & Goodnight, 1947 — Colombia

- Paracranaus Roewer, 1913

- Paracranaus crassipalpis Roewer, 1913 — Colombia

- Parkocranaus Mello-Leitão, 1949

- Parkocranaus bimaculatus Mello-Leitão, 1949

- Peripa Roewer, 1925

- Peripa clavipus Roewer, 1925 — Ecuador
- Peripa simplex Roewer, 1932 — Colombia

- Phalangodus Gervais, 1842

- Phalangodus anacosmetus Gervais, 1842 — Colombia
- Phalangodus poecilis (Roewer, 1943) — Peru

- Phareicranaus Roewer, 1913

- Phareicranaus albigranulatus Roewer, 1913 — Colombia
- Phareicranaus albigyratus Roewer, 1932 — Colombia
- Phareicranaus albilineatus Roewer, 1932 — Venezuela
- Phareicranaus albimedialis (Goodnight & Goodnight, 1943) — Peru
- Phareicranaus calcariferus (Simon, 1879) — Colombia, Trinidad
- Phareicranaus cingulatus Roewer, 1932 — Bolivia
- Phareicranaus festae Roewer, 1925 — Ecuador
- Phareicranaus giganteus Roewer, 1932 — Chile, Colombia
- Phareicranaus magnus (Roewer, 1932) — Panama
- Phareicranaus marcuzzi Caporiacco, 1951 — Venezuela
- Phareicranaus ornatus Roewer, 1932 — Panama, Costa Rica
- Phareicranaus parallelus Roewer, 1925 — Ecuador
- Phareicranaus x-albus Roewer, 1925 — Ecuador
- Phareicranaus angelica Roewer, 1963 — Colombia
- Phareicranaus arthrocentricus (Mello-Leitão, 1943) — Ecuador
- Phareicranaus calcarfemoralis (Roewer, 1917) — Venezuela
- Phareicranaus calcartibialis (Roewer, 1915) — Venezuela
- Phareicranaus circumlineatus M. A. González-Sponga, 1989 — Venezuela
- Phareicranaus curvipes (Roewer, 1916) — Venezuela
- Phareicranaus duranti M. A. González-Sponga, 1989 — Venezuela
- Phareicranaus festae (Roewer, 1925) — Ecuador
- Phareicranaus giganteus (Roewer, 1913) — Ecuador
- Phareicranaus heliae S. Avram, 1983 — Venezuela
- Phareicranaus magnus Goodnight & Goodnight, 1942 — Guyana
- Phareicranaus manauara R. Pinto-da-Rocha, 1994 — Brazil
- Phareicranaus ortizi Roewer, 1952 — Peru
- Phareicranaus singularis (H. Soares, 1970)
- Phareicranaus spinulatus Goodnight & Goodnight, 1943 — Colombia

- Puna Roewer, 1925

- Puna festae Roewer, 1925 — Ecuador
- Puna semicircularis Roewer, 1932 — Ecuador (!possibly to edit after Hallan, see Carsevennia).
- Puna metatarsalis A. B. Kury, 1994 — Ecuador (!edit after Hallan, from Yania)

- Quindina Roewer, 1914

- Quindina bella Roewer, 1914 — Colombia
- Quindina bimaculata Roewer, 1932

- Sibundoxia Roewer, 1963

- Sibundoxia scripta Roewer, 1963 — Colombia

- Spinicranaus Roewer, 1913

- Spinicranaus camposi (Mello-Leitão, 1942) — Ecuador
- Spinicranaus diabolicus (Simon, 1879) — Ecuador

- Spirunius Roewer, 1932

- Spirunius coxipunctus Roewer, 1932 — Ecuador

- Stygnicranella Caporiacco, 1951

- Stygnicranella pizai Caporiacco, 1951 — Venezuela

- Tetracranaus Roewer, 1963

- Tetracranaus zilchi Roewer, 1963 — Colombia

- Thaumatocranaus Roewer, 1932

- Thaumatocranaus mirabilis Roewer, 1932 — Ecuador

- Timotesa Roewer, 1943

- Timotesa octomaculata Roewer, 1943 — Venezuela

- Tripilatus Roewer, 1932

- Tripilatus elegans Roewer, 1932 — Bolivia

- Ventrifurca Roewer, 1913

- Ventrifurca albipustulata Roewer, 1913 — Colombia

- Ventripila Roewer, 1917

- Ventripila marginata Roewer, 1917 — Ecuador

- Ventrisudis Roewer, 1963

- Ventrisudis mira Roewer, 1963 — Colombia

- Ventrivomer Roewer, 1913

- Ventrivomer ancyrophorus (Butler, 1873) — Ecuador, Bolivia

== Heterocranainae ==
Heterocranainae Roewer, 1913

- Heterocranaus Roewer, 1913

- Heterocranaus lutescens (Roewer, 1919) — Ecuador
- Heterocranaus margaritipalpis (Simon, 1879) — Ecuador, Colombia

== Prostygninae ==
Prostygninae Roewer, 1913

- Binamballeus Roewer, 1952

- Binamballeus metatarsalis Roewer, 1952 — Peru

- Chiriboga Roewer, 1959

- Chiriboga albituber Roewer, 1959 — Ecuador

- Cutervolus Roewer, 1957

- Cutervolus albopunctatus Roewer, 1957 — Peru

- Globibunus Roewer, 1912

- Globibunus rubrofemoratus Roewer, 1912 — Ecuador

- Globitarsus Roewer, 1913

- Globitarsus angustus Roewer, 1913 — Colombia

- Lisarea Roewer, 1943

- Lisarea ferruginea Roewer, 1943 — Ecuador

- Meridanatus Roewer, 1943

- Meridanatus berlandi Roewer, 1943 — Venezuela

- Micropachylus Roewer, 1913

- Micropachylus metatarsalis Roewer, 1913 — Colombia

- Peladoius Roewer, 1919

- Peladoius riveti Roewer, 1919 — Ecuador

- Prostygnellus Roewer, 1919

- Prostygnellus isabellinus (Roewer, 1943) — Ecuador
- Prostygnellus riveti Roewer, 1919 — Ecuador

- Prostignidius Roewer, 1915

- Prostignidius pustulatus Roewer, 1915 — Colombia

- Prostygnus Roewer, 1913

- Prostygnus vestitus Roewer, 1913 — Colombia

- Sclerostygnellus Roewer, 1943

- Sclerostygnellus rotundus Roewer, 1943 — Colombia

- Troya Roewer, 1919

- Troya riveti Roewer, 1919 — Ecuador

- Yania Roewer, 1919 (!edit after Hallan)

- Yania flavolimbata Roewer, 1919 — Ecuador

== Stygnicranainae ==
Stygnicranainae Roewer, 1913

- Agathocranaus Orrico & Kury, 2009

- Agathocranaus innocens Orrico & Kury, 2009 — Ecuador

- Stygnicranaus Roewer, 1913

- Stygnicranaus abnormis Roewer, 1913 — Colombia
- Stygnicranaus alessandroi Orrico & Kury, 2009 — Colombia
- Stygnicranaus concolor Kury, 1995 — Colombia
- Stygnicranaus poncedeleoni Orrico & Kury, 2009 — Colombia

- Tryferos Roewer, 1931

- Tryferos elegans Roewer, 1931 — Ecuador
