= Chiriboga =

Chiriboga is a surname. Notable people with the surname include:

- Ángel Leonidas Araújo Chiriboga, Ecuadorian composer, poet, tax collector and hotelier
- Edmundo Chiriboga, Ecuadorian Army captain
- Federico Páez Chiriboga, President of Ecuador
- Galo Chiriboga, Ecuadorian lawyer, politician, and administrator
- Héctor Chiriboga, Ecuadorian footballer
- Israel Chiriboga (born 1998), Ecuadorian artistic gymnast
- Jorge Araújo Chiriboga, Ecuadorian composer and actor
- Luis Chiriboga, Ecuadorian businessman, civil engineer and sports administrator
- Luis Chiriboga Izquierdo, Ecuadorian writer
- Luz Argentina Chiriboga (born 1940), Ecuadorian writer
- Pacifico Chiriboga (1810–1886), Ecuadorian politician
- Raúl Eduardo Vela Chiriboga, Ecuadorian archbishop and cardinal

== See also ==
- Saphenista chiriboga, a species of moth
