= Yania =

Scientific classification
- Domain: Eukaryota
- Kingdom: Animalia
- Phylum: Arthropoda
- Subphylum: Chelicerata
- Class: Arachnida
- Order: Opiliones
- Superfamily: Gonyleptoidea
- Family: Prostygnidae
- Genus: Yania; Roewer, 1914
- Species: Y. flavolimbata

Binomial name
- Yania flavolimbata Roewer, 1914

Genus of harvestmen

Yania is a genus of harvestmen from South America. Yania flavolimbata is the only species in the monotypic genus Yania. It was first described by Roewer, 1914.

== Description ==
Yania flavolimbata is endemic to Ecuador, with the sole male holotype from “Yana Urcu, 4536 m”.

== Species ==
These species belong to the genus Yania:

- Yania flavolimbata Roewer 1914 – Ecuador
