= Saphenista simillima =

Scientific classification
- Kingdom: Animalia
- Phylum: Arthropoda
- Clade: Pancrustacea
- Class: Insecta
- Order: Lepidoptera
- Family: Tortricidae
- Genus: Saphenista
- Species: S. simillima

Binomial name
- Saphenista simillima Razowski & Becker, 2007

Species of moth

Saphenista simillima is a species of moth of the family Tortricidae. It is found on Cuba.

The wingspan is about 9 mm.

== Etymology ==
The species name refers to great genital similarity to Saphenista semistrigata.
