= Barlovento =

Barlovento (Spanish for "windward") may refer to:

- Barlovento, Santa Cruz de Tenerife, Canary Islands
- Barlovento, Venezuela, Miranda
- "Barlovento", a song by Venezuelan composer Eduardo Serrano
- Barlovento (harvestman), a genus of harvestman (Agoristenidae)

== See also ==
- Barlavento (disambiguation) (Portuguese)
