= Meridia =

Meridia may refer to:

- Sibutramine, an orally administered agent for the treatment of obesity, and sold under the brand name Meridia
- Meridia, a genus of harvestman in the family Manaosbiidae
- Meridia, a planet turned Terminid Supercolony in the Game Helldivers II
- Meridia, one of the Daedric Princes in The Elder Scrolls series of computer games.
