= Saphenista runtuna =

Scientific classification
- Domain: Eukaryota
- Kingdom: Animalia
- Phylum: Arthropoda
- Class: Insecta
- Order: Lepidoptera
- Family: Tortricidae
- Genus: Saphenista
- Species: S. runtuna

Binomial name
- Saphenista runtuna Razowski & Wojtusiak, 2009

Species of moth

Saphenista runtuna is a species of moth of the family Tortricidae. It is found in Tungurahua Province, Ecuador.

The wingspan is about 16 mm (0.63 in).

== Etymology ==
The species name refers to the type locality, Runtun in Baños Canton.
