= Saphenista nephelodes =

Scientific classification
- Domain: Eukaryota
- Kingdom: Animalia
- Phylum: Arthropoda
- Class: Insecta
- Order: Lepidoptera
- Family: Tortricidae
- Genus: Saphenista
- Species: S. nephelodes

Binomial name
- Saphenista nephelodes (Clarke, 1968)

Synonyms
- Amallectis nephelodes Clarke, 1968

Species of moth

Saphenista nephelodes is a species of moth of the family Tortricidae. It is found in Bolivia.
