= Saphenista saragurae =

Scientific classification
- Domain: Eukaryota
- Kingdom: Animalia
- Phylum: Arthropoda
- Class: Insecta
- Order: Lepidoptera
- Family: Tortricidae
- Genus: Saphenista
- Species: S. saragurae

Binomial name
- Saphenista saragurae Razowski & Wojtusiak, 2008

Species of moth

Saphenista saragurae is a species of moth of the family Tortricidae. It is found in Loja Province, Ecuador.

The wingspan is about 16.5 mm.

== Etymology ==
The species name refers to the type locality.
