= Metasarcidae =

Scientific classification
- Domain: Eukaryota
- Kingdom: Animalia
- Phylum: Arthropoda
- Subphylum: Chelicerata
- Class: Arachnida
- Order: Opiliones
- Superfamily: Gonyleptoidea
- Family: Metasarcidae; Kury, 1994

Family of harvestmen/daddy longlegs

Metasarcidae is a family of harvestmen, first described by Adriano B. Kury in 1994.

== Genera ==
Metasarcidae contains the following seven genera:

- Ayacucho Roewer, 1949
- Huancabamba Benedetti & Pinto-da-Rocha, 2022
- Incasarcus Kury & Maury, 1998
- Lumieria Benedetti & Pinto-da-Rocha, 2022
- Metasarcus Roewer, 1913
- Tripilatus Roewer, 1932
- Tschaidicancha Roewer, 1957
