= Saphenista milicha =

Scientific classification
- Domain: Eukaryota
- Kingdom: Animalia
- Phylum: Arthropoda
- Class: Insecta
- Order: Lepidoptera
- Family: Tortricidae
- Genus: Saphenista
- Species: S. milicha

Binomial name
- Saphenista milicha Razowski, 1994

Species of moth

Saphenista milicha is a species of moth of the family Tortricidae. It is found in Veracruz, Mexico.
