= Saphenista aculeata =

Scientific classification
- Kingdom: Animalia
- Phylum: Arthropoda
- Class: Insecta
- Order: Lepidoptera
- Family: Tortricidae
- Genus: Saphenista
- Species: S. aculeata

Binomial name
- Saphenista aculeata (Razowski, 1967)

Synonyms
- Phalonidia aculeata Razowski, 1967

Species of moth

Saphenista aculeata is a species of moth of the family Tortricidae. It is found in Chimborazo Province, Ecuador.
