= Saphenista rawlinsiana =

Scientific classification
- Domain: Eukaryota
- Kingdom: Animalia
- Phylum: Arthropoda
- Class: Insecta
- Order: Lepidoptera
- Family: Tortricidae
- Genus: Saphenista
- Species: S. rawlinsiana

Binomial name
- Saphenista rawlinsiana Razowski, 1994

Species of moth

Saphenista rawlinsiana is a species of moth of the family Tortricidae. It is found in Azuay Province, Ecuador.
