= Saphenista aeraria =

Scientific classification
- Kingdom: Animalia
- Phylum: Arthropoda
- Class: Insecta
- Order: Lepidoptera
- Family: Tortricidae
- Genus: Saphenista
- Species: S. aeraria

Binomial name
- Saphenista aeraria (Razowski, 1967)

Synonyms
- Phalonidia aeraria Razowski, 1967

Species of moth

Saphenista aeraria is a species of moth of the family Tortricidae. It is found in Peru.
