= Saphenista ryrsiloba =

Scientific classification
- Kingdom: Animalia
- Phylum: Arthropoda
- Class: Insecta
- Order: Lepidoptera
- Family: Tortricidae
- Genus: Saphenista
- Species: S. ryrsiloba

Binomial name
- Saphenista ryrsiloba Razowski, 1990

Species of moth

Saphenista ryrsiloba is a species of moth of the family Tortricidae. It is found in the State of Mexico in Mexico.
