= Saphenista rivadeneirai =

Scientific classification
- Kingdom: Animalia
- Phylum: Arthropoda
- Class: Insecta
- Order: Lepidoptera
- Family: Tortricidae
- Genus: Saphenista
- Species: S. rivadeneirai

Binomial name
- Saphenista rivadeneirai Razowski & Pelz, 2001

Species of moth

Saphenista rivadeneirai is a species of moth of the family Tortricidae. It is found in Morona-Santiago Province, Ecuador.
