= Saphenista bimaculata =

Scientific classification
- Kingdom: Animalia
- Phylum: Arthropoda
- Clade: Pancrustacea
- Class: Insecta
- Order: Lepidoptera
- Family: Tortricidae
- Genus: Saphenista
- Species: S. bimaculata

Binomial name
- Saphenista bimaculata Nishida & Adamski, 2004

Species of moth

Saphenista bimaculata is a species of moth of the family Tortricidae. It is found in Costa Rica.

The length of the forewings is 7-7.3 mm.

The larvae feed on Ageratina ixiocladon.
