= Saphenista paraconsona =

Scientific classification
- Kingdom: Animalia
- Phylum: Arthropoda
- Clade: Pancrustacea
- Class: Insecta
- Order: Lepidoptera
- Family: Tortricidae
- Genus: Saphenista
- Species: S. paraconsona

Binomial name
- Saphenista paraconsona Razowski & Becker, 2002

Species of moth

Saphenista paraconsona is a species of moth of the family Tortricidae. It is found in Minas Gerais, Brazil.

The wingspan is about 10 mm.
