= Saphenista pululahuana =

Scientific classification
- Kingdom: Animalia
- Phylum: Arthropoda
- Class: Insecta
- Order: Lepidoptera
- Family: Tortricidae
- Genus: Saphenista
- Species: S. pululahuana

Binomial name
- Saphenista pululahuana Razowski & Wojtusiak, 2008

Species of moth

Saphenista pululahuana is a species of moth of the family Tortricidae. It is found in Ecuador (Pichincha Province) and Peru.

The wingspan is about 21.5 mm.
