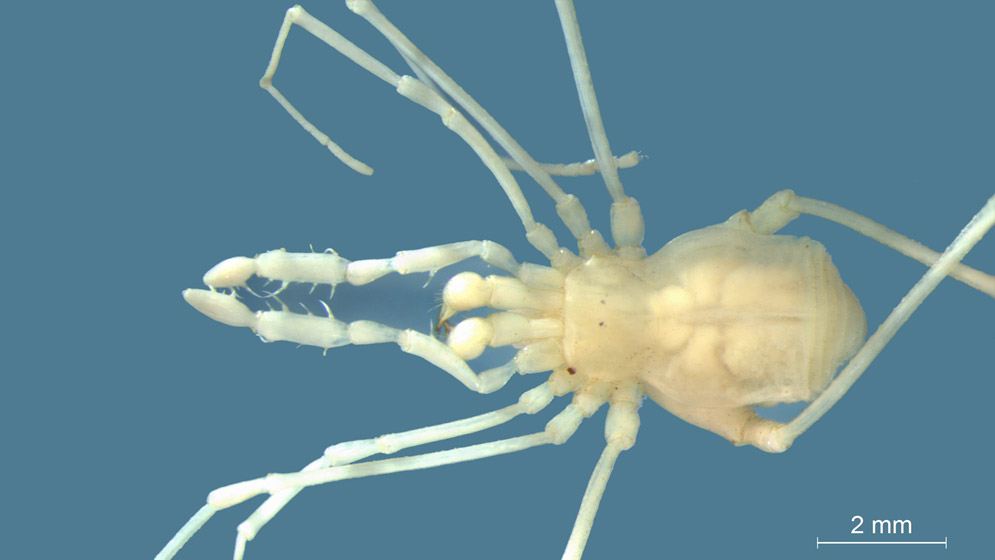
- Male specimen

Scientific classification
- Kingdom: Animalia
- Phylum: Arthropoda
- Subphylum: Chelicerata
- Class: Arachnida
- Order: Opiliones
- Suborder: Laniatores
- Infraorder: Grassatores
- Superfamily: Gonyleptoidea
- Family: Otilioleptidae; Acosta, 2019
- Genus: Otilioleptes; Acosta, 2019
- Species: O. marcelae

Binomial name
- Otilioleptes marcelae Acosta, 2019

= Otilioleptes =

Family of harvestmen/daddy longlegs

Otilioleptidae is a monotypic harvestmen family, placed within Gonyleptoidea. It contains a single genus, Otilioleptes, and a single species, Otilioleptes marcelae . This harvestman is a troglobite, to date only found in the lava tube known as "Doña Otilia", Payunia region, Mendoza province, Argentina.
