= Saphenista deliphrobursa =

Scientific classification
- Domain: Eukaryota
- Kingdom: Animalia
- Phylum: Arthropoda
- Class: Insecta
- Order: Lepidoptera
- Family: Tortricidae
- Genus: Saphenista
- Species: S. deliphrobursa

Binomial name
- Saphenista deliphrobursa (Razowski, 1992)

Synonyms
- Phalonidia deliphrobursa Razowski, 1992

Species of moth

Saphenista deliphrobursa is a species of moth of the family Tortricidae. It is found in Costa Rica.

The wingspan is about 8.5 mm.
