= Saphenista lineata =

Scientific classification
- Kingdom: Animalia
- Phylum: Arthropoda
- Clade: Pancrustacea
- Class: Insecta
- Order: Lepidoptera
- Family: Tortricidae
- Genus: Saphenista
- Species: S. lineata

Binomial name
- Saphenista lineata Razowski & Becker, 2002

Species of moth

Saphenista lineata is a species of moth of the family Tortricidae. It is found in Azuay Province, Ecuador.

The wingspan is about 16 mm.
