= Saphenista rhabducha =

Scientific classification
- Kingdom: Animalia
- Phylum: Arthropoda
- Clade: Pancrustacea
- Class: Insecta
- Order: Lepidoptera
- Family: Tortricidae
- Genus: Saphenista
- Species: S. rhabducha

Binomial name
- Saphenista rhabducha Razowski & Becker, 2007

Species of moth

Saphenista rhabducha is a species of moth in the family Tortricidae. It is found in Pastaza Province, Ecuador.

The wingspan is about 14.5 mm.

== Etymology ==
The species name is derived from Greek rhabduchos (meaning carrying a perch).
