= Eutimesius =

Scientific classification
- Domain: Eukaryota
- Kingdom: Animalia
- Phylum: Arthropoda
- Subphylum: Chelicerata
- Class: Arachnida
- Order: Opiliones
- Superfamily: Gonyleptoidea
- Family: Stygnidae
- Subfamily: Heterostygninae
- Genus: Eutimesius; Roewer, 1913

Type species
- Eutimesius simoni Roewer, 1913

Species
- See text

Diversity
- 5 species

Genus of harvestmen/daddy longlegs

Eutimesius is a genus of harvestmen in the family Stygnidae with five described species (as of 2024). All species are found in South America.

== Description ==
The genus Eutimesius was described by Roewer, 1913, with the type species Eutimesius simoni Roewer, 1913. They are diagnosed by the cephalothorax with one enlarged eminence; dorsal scute with white spots; area III with two spines; and the penis with distal U-shaped cleft, ventral plate narrow and long at base; stylus with dorsal process and the basal half of the glans membranous (See Pinto-da-Rocha, Machado & Giribet, 1997)

== Species ==
These species belong to the genus Eutimesius:

- Eutimesius albicinctus (Roewer, 1915) – Venezuela (Mérida).
- Eutimesius ephippiatus (Roewer, 1915) – Colombia (Quindío).
- Eutimesius ornatus (Roewer, 1943) – Colombia (Cundinamarca); Venezuela(Táchira).
- Eutimesius punctatus (Roewer, 1913) – Venezuela (Mérida).
- Eutimesius simoni Roewer, 1913 – Brazil (Amazonas); Colombia (Putumayo); Ecuador (Sucumbíos, Los Ríos); Peru (Loreto).

== Etymology ==
The genus is Masculine. From Greek εὖ (rightful, proper, good) + pre-existing genus Timesius.
