= Saphenista pascana =

Scientific classification
- Domain: Eukaryota
- Kingdom: Animalia
- Phylum: Arthropoda
- Class: Insecta
- Order: Lepidoptera
- Family: Tortricidae
- Genus: Saphenista
- Species: S. pascana

Binomial name
- Saphenista pascana Razowski & Wojtusiak, 2010

Species of moth

Saphenista pascana is a species of moth of the family Tortricidae. It is found in Peru.

The wingspan is about 19.5 mm.
