= Saphenista mediocris =

Scientific classification
- Kingdom: Animalia
- Phylum: Arthropoda
- Class: Insecta
- Order: Lepidoptera
- Family: Tortricidae
- Genus: Saphenista
- Species: S. mediocris

Binomial name
- Saphenista mediocris Razowski, 1986

Species of moth

Saphenista mediocris is a species of moth of the family Tortricidae. It is found in Nuevo León, Mexico.
