= Saphenista cnemiodota =

Scientific classification
- Kingdom: Animalia
- Phylum: Arthropoda
- Class: Insecta
- Order: Lepidoptera
- Family: Tortricidae
- Genus: Saphenista
- Species: S. cnemiodota

Binomial name
- Saphenista cnemiodota Razowski, 1994

Species of moth

Saphenista cnemiodota is a species of moth of the family Tortricidae. It is found in Mexico (Tamaulipas, State of Mexico).
