= Saphenista tufinoa =

Scientific classification
- Kingdom: Animalia
- Phylum: Arthropoda
- Class: Insecta
- Order: Lepidoptera
- Family: Tortricidae
- Genus: Saphenista
- Species: S. tufinoa

Binomial name
- Saphenista tufinoa Razowski & Brown, 1999

Species of moth

Saphenista tufinoa is a species of moth of the family Tortricidae. It is found in Ecuador in the provinces of Cotopaxi and Carchi.
