= Saphenista chanostium =

Scientific classification
- Domain: Eukaryota
- Kingdom: Animalia
- Phylum: Arthropoda
- Class: Insecta
- Order: Lepidoptera
- Family: Tortricidae
- Genus: Saphenista
- Species: S. chanostium

Binomial name
- Saphenista chanostium Razowski & Wojtusiak, 2009

Species of moth

Saphenista chanostium is a species of moth of the family Tortricidae. It is found in Ecuador in the provinces of Napo and Morona-Santiago.

The wingspan is about 26 mm.
