= Saphenista sphragidias =

Scientific classification
- Kingdom: Animalia
- Phylum: Arthropoda
- Class: Insecta
- Order: Lepidoptera
- Family: Tortricidae
- Genus: Saphenista
- Species: S. sphragidias

Binomial name
- Saphenista sphragidias (Meyrick, 1932)

Synonyms
- Phalonia sphragidias Meyrick, 1932

Species of moth

Saphenista sphragidias is a species of moth of the family Tortricidae. It is found in Andes of Bolivia.
