= Saphenista cordifera =

Scientific classification
- Kingdom: Animalia
- Phylum: Arthropoda
- Class: Insecta
- Order: Lepidoptera
- Family: Tortricidae
- Genus: Saphenista
- Species: S. cordifera

Binomial name
- Saphenista cordifera (Meyrick, 1932)

Synonyms
- Phtheochroa cordifera Meyrick, 1932

Species of moth

Saphenista cordifera is a species of moth of the family Tortricidae. It is found in Bolivia.
