= Gerdesiidae =

Scientific classification
- Kingdom: Animalia
- Phylum: Arthropoda
- Subphylum: Chelicerata
- Class: Arachnida
- Order: Opiliones
- Suborder: Laniatores
- Infraorder: Grassatores
- Superfamily: Gonyleptoidea
- Family: Gerdesiidae; Bragagnolo, Hara & Pinto-da-Rocha, 2015

Type species
- Gerdesius peruvianus Roewer, 1952

Family of harvestmen

Gerdesiidae is a family of harvestmen in the superfamily Gonyleptoidea found in South America.

== Taxonomy and systematics ==
The family Gerdesiidae was proposed in 2015. Data indicate it is the sister family of Tricommatidae.

== Genera ==
- Gerdesius Roewer, 1952
  - Gerdesius peruvianus Roewer, 1952
  - Gerdesius hoeferi (Kury, 1995)
  - Gerdesius mapinguari Bragagnolo, Hara & Pinto-da-Rocha, 2015
  - Gerdesius paruensis (H. Soares, 1970)
- Gonycranaus Bragagnolo, Hara & Pinto-da-Rocha, 2015
  - Gonycranaus androgynus Bragagnolo, Hara & Pinto-da-Rocha, 2015
  - Gonycranaus pluto Bragagnolo, Hara & Pinto-da-Rocha, 2015

== Distribution ==
The family has a disjunct distribution in South America, occurring in northern regions (Peru, Brazilian Amazon), southeastern Brazil (Minas Gerais State) and French Guiana.
