= Saphenista mira =

Scientific classification
- Kingdom: Animalia
- Phylum: Arthropoda
- Class: Insecta
- Order: Lepidoptera
- Family: Tortricidae
- Genus: Saphenista
- Species: S. mira

Binomial name
- Saphenista mira Razowski, 1989

Species of moth

Saphenista mira is a species of moth of the family Tortricidae. It is found in Guatemala.
