= Saphenista delapsa =

Scientific classification
- Kingdom: Animalia
- Phylum: Arthropoda
- Class: Insecta
- Order: Lepidoptera
- Family: Tortricidae
- Genus: Saphenista
- Species: S. delapsa

Binomial name
- Saphenista delapsa Razowski, 1990

Species of moth

Saphenista delapsa is a species of moth of the family Tortricidae. It is found in Guerrero, Mexico.
