= Poassa =

Scientific classification
- Kingdom: Animalia
- Phylum: Arthropoda
- Subphylum: Chelicerata
- Class: Arachnida
- Order: Opiliones
- Family: Manaosbiidae
- Genus: Poassa; Roewer, 1943
- Species: P. limbata

Binomial name
- Poassa limbata Roewer, 1943

Genus of harvestmen/daddy longlegs

Poassa is a genus of Opiliones from the Manaosbiidae family. The scientific name of this genus was first published in 1943 by Carl Friedrich Roewer.

== Species ==
Poassa is a monotypic taxon and only contains the species Poassa limbata.
