= Saphenista merana =

Scientific classification
- Kingdom: Animalia
- Phylum: Arthropoda
- Clade: Pancrustacea
- Class: Insecta
- Order: Lepidoptera
- Family: Tortricidae
- Genus: Saphenista
- Species: S. merana

Binomial name
- Saphenista merana Razowski & Becker, 2002

Species of moth

Saphenista merana is a species of moth of the family Tortricidae. It is found in Pastaza Province, Ecuador.

The wingspan is about 16 mm.
