= Saphenista saxicolana =

Scientific classification
- Kingdom: Animalia
- Phylum: Arthropoda
- Clade: Pancrustacea
- Class: Insecta
- Order: Lepidoptera
- Family: Tortricidae
- Genus: Saphenista
- Species: S. saxicolana

Binomial name
- Saphenista saxicolana (Walsingham, 1879)

Synonyms
- Cochylis saxicolana Walsingham, 1879

Species of moth

Saphenista saxicolana is a species of moth of the family Tortricidae. It is found in the United States in Oregon and California.

The wingspan is about 14 mm. Adults are on wing from March to May and in July.
