= Saphenista rufoscripta =

Scientific classification
- Domain: Eukaryota
- Kingdom: Animalia
- Phylum: Arthropoda
- Class: Insecta
- Order: Lepidoptera
- Family: Tortricidae
- Genus: Saphenista
- Species: S. rufoscripta

Binomial name
- Saphenista rufoscripta Razowski & Wojtusiak, 2010

Species of moth

Saphenista rufoscripta is a species of moth of the family Tortricidae. It is found in Peru.

The wingspan is about 22.5 mm.
