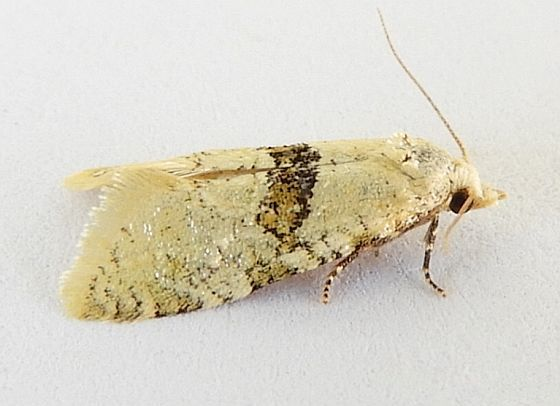
- Saphenista bartellae

Scientific classification
- Kingdom: Animalia
- Phylum: Arthropoda
- Class: Insecta
- Order: Lepidoptera
- Family: Tortricidae
- Subfamily: Tortricinae
- Tribe: Cochylini
- Genus: Saphenista; Walsingham, 1914

= Saphenista =

Genus of tortrix moths

Saphenista is a genus of moths belonging to the family Tortricidae.

== Species ==
The following species are recognised in the genus Saphenista:

- Saphenista absidata Razowski, 1994
- Saphenista aculeata (Razowski, 1967)
- Saphenista aeraria (Razowski, 1967)
- Saphenista allasia Razowski, 1994
- Saphenista alpha Razowski & Becker, 2007
- Saphenista ambidextria Razowski, 1994
- Saphenista amusa Razowski, 1993
- Saphenista anaxia (Clarke, 1968)
- Saphenista bartellae Brown, 2019
- Saphenista beta Razowski & Becker, 2007
- Saphenista bimaculata Nishida & Adamski, 2004
- Saphenista brunneomaculata Razowski & Wojtusiak, 2008
- Saphenista bunteoides Forbes, 1931
- Saphenista burrens Razowski, 1993
- Saphenista campalita Razowski, 1993
- Saphenista carchiana Razowski & Becker, 2002
- Saphenista ceteora Razowski & Becker, 2002
- Saphenista chanostium Razowski & Wojtusiak, 2009
- Saphenista chasia Razowski & Becker, 2010
- Saphenista chiriboga Razowski & Wojtusiak, 2008
- Saphenista chlorfascia Razowski & Becker, 2007
- Saphenista chloromixta Razowski, 1992
- Saphenista cinigmula (Razowski & Becker, 1986)
- Saphenista cnemiodota Razowski, 1994
- Saphenista consectaria Razowski, 1993
- Saphenista consona Razowski & Becker, 1983
- Saphenista constipata Razowski, 1994
- Saphenista consulta Razowski, 1986
- Saphenista contermina Razowski & Becker, 2002
- Saphenista cordifera (Meyrick, 1932)
- Saphenista cryptogramma Razowski & Becker, 1994
- Saphenista cubana Razowski & Becker, 2007
- Saphenista cuscana Razowski & Wojtusiak, 2010
- Saphenista cyphoma Razowski, 1994
- Saphenista delapsa Razowski, 1990
- Saphenista delicatulana (Zeller, 1877)
- Saphenista deliphrobursa (Razowski, 1992)
- Saphenista dexia Razowski & Becker, 1986
- Saphenista discrepans Razowski, 1994
- Saphenista domna (Clarke, 1968)
- Saphenista embolina Razowski, 1984
- Saphenista endomycha Razowski, 1992
- Saphenista eneilema Razowski, 1992
- Saphenista ephimera Razowski, 1992
- Saphenista epiera Razowski, 1992
- Saphenista epipolea Razowski, 1992
- Saphenista eranna Razowski & Becker, 1986
- Saphenista erasmia Razowski, 1992
- Saphenista ereba Razowski, 1992
- Saphenista euprepia Razowski, 1993
- Saphenista fluida Razowski, 1986
- Saphenista frangula (Clarke, 1968)
- Saphenista gilva Razowski & Becker, 1986
- Saphenista glorianda Razowski, 1986
- Saphenista gnathmocera Razowski, 1992
- Saphenista illimis Razowski, 1986
- Saphenista imaginaria Razowski & Becker, 1986
- Saphenista incauta Razowski & Becker, 1986
- Saphenista juvenca Razowski & Becker, 1986
- Saphenista lacteipalpis (Walsingham, 1891)
- Saphenista lassa (Razowski, 1986)
- Saphenista lathridia Razowski & Becker, 1986
- Saphenista leuconigra Razowski & Wojtusiak, 2008
- Saphenista lineata Razowski & Becker, 2002
- Saphenista livida Razowski, 1986
- Saphenista mediocris Razowski, 1986
- Saphenista melema Razowski, 1992
- Saphenista merana Razowski & Becker, 2002
- Saphenista milicha Razowski, 1994
- Saphenista mira Razowski, 1989
- Saphenista muerta Nishida & Adamski, 2004
- Saphenista multistrigata Walsingham, 1914
- Saphenista nauphraga Razowski & Becker, 1983
- Saphenista nephelodes (Clarke, 1968)
- Saphenista nomonana (Kearfott, 1907)
- Saphenista nongrata Razowski, 1986
- Saphenista novaelimae Razowski & Becker, 2007
- Saphenista nuda Razowski & Becker, 1999
- Saphenista ochrapex Razowski & Becker, 2010
- Saphenista ochraurea Razowski & Becker, 2002
- Saphenista omoea Razowski, 1993
- Saphenista onychina Razowski & Becker, 1986
- Saphenista oreada Razowski & Becker, 1986
- Saphenista orescia Razowski & Becker, 1986
- Saphenista orichalcana Razowski & Becker, 1986
- Saphenista parabeta Razowski & Becker, 2010
- Saphenista paraconsona Razowski & Becker, 2002
- Saphenista parvimaculana (Walsingham, 1879)
- Saphenista pascana Razowski & Wojtusiak, 2010
- Saphenista penai (Clarke, 1968)
- Saphenista peraviae Razowski, 1994
- Saphenista perlaria Razowski & Becker, 2010
- Saphenista peruviana Razowski, 1993
- Saphenista phenax Razowski, 1994
- Saphenista powelli Brown, 2019
- Saphenista praefasciata (Meyrick, 1932)
- Saphenista praia Razowski, 1986
- Saphenista pruinosana (Zeller, 1877)
- Saphenista pululahuana Razowski & Wojtusiak, 2008
- Saphenista pyrczi Razowski & Wojtusiak, 2009
- Saphenista rafaeliana Razowski, 1989
- Saphenista rawlinsiana Razowski, 1994
- Saphenista rhabducha Razowski & Becker, 2007
- Saphenista rivadeneirai Razowski & Pelz, 2001
- Saphenista rosariana Razowski & Becker, 2007
- Saphenista rufoscripta Razowski & Wojtusiak, 2010
- Saphenista rufozodion Razowski & Becker, 2002
- Saphenista runtuna Razowski & Wojtusiak, 2009
- Saphenista ryrsiloba Razowski, 1990
- Saphenista saragurae Razowski & Wojtusiak, 2008
- Saphenista saxicolana (Walsingham, 1879)
- Saphenista scalena Razowski & Becker, 2007
- Saphenista sclerorhaphia Razowski & Becker, 1994
- Saphenista semistrigata Forbes, 1931
- Saphenista simillima Razowski & Becker, 2007
- Saphenista solda Razowski, 1994
- Saphenista solisae Razowski & Becker, 2007
- Saphenista sphragidias (Meyrick, 1932)
- Saphenista splendida Razowski & Becker, 2002
- Saphenista storthingoloba Razowski, 1992
- Saphenista subperlaria Razowski & Becker, 2010
- Saphenista subsphragidias Razowski & Becker, 2002
- Saphenista substructa (Meyrick, 1927)
- Saphenista temperata Razowski, 1986
- Saphenista teopiscana Razowski & Becker, 1986
- Saphenista tufinoa Razowski, 1999
- Saphenista turguinoa Razowski & Becker, 2007
- Saphenista xysta Razowski, 1994
- BOLD:AAX9187 (Saphenista sp.)
- BOLD:AAX9189 (Saphenista sp.)
- BOLD:ABV4579 (Saphenista sp.)

== See also ==
- List of Tortricidae genera
