= Saphenista burrens =

Scientific classification
- Kingdom: Animalia
- Phylum: Arthropoda
- Class: Insecta
- Order: Lepidoptera
- Family: Tortricidae
- Genus: Saphenista
- Species: S. burrens

Binomial name
- Saphenista burrens Razowski, 1993

Synonyms
- Saphenista burreus Razowski, in Heppner, 1995

Species of moth

Saphenista burrens is a species of moth of the family Tortricidae. It is found in Peru.
