= Imeri (harvestman) =

Scientific classification
- Domain: Eukaryota
- Kingdom: Animalia
- Phylum: Arthropoda
- Subphylum: Chelicerata
- Class: Arachnida
- Order: Opiliones
- Superfamily: Gonyleptoidea
- Family: Stygnidae
- Subfamily: Heterostygninae
- Genus: Imeri; Pinto-da-Rocha, R. & Tourinho, 2012

Type species
- Imeri lomanhungae Pinto-da-Rocha, R. & Tourinho, 2012

Species
- See text

Diversity
- 2 species

Genus of harvestmen/daddy longlegs

Imeri is a genus of harvestmen in the family Stygnidae with two described species (as of 2024). Both species are found in Brazil in the state of Amazonas.

== Description ==
The genus Imeri was described by Pinto-da-Rocha & Tourinho, 2012, with the type species Imeri lomanhungae Pinto-da-Rocha & Tourinho, 2012

== Species ==
These species belong to the genus Imeri:

- Imeri ajuba Coronato-Ribeiro, Pinto-da-Rocha & Rheims, 2013 – Brazil (Amazonas)
- Imeri lomanhungae Pinto-da-Rocha & Tourinho, 2012 – Brazil (Amazonas)

== Etymology ==
The genus is Masculine.
