= Saphenista embolina =

Scientific classification
- Kingdom: Animalia
- Phylum: Arthropoda
- Class: Insecta
- Order: Lepidoptera
- Family: Tortricidae
- Genus: Saphenista
- Species: S. embolina

Binomial name
- Saphenista embolina Razowski, 1984

Species of moth

Saphenista embolina is a species of moth of the family Tortricidae. It is found in Venezuela.
