= Saphenista incauta =

Scientific classification
- Kingdom: Animalia
- Phylum: Arthropoda
- Clade: Pancrustacea
- Class: Insecta
- Order: Lepidoptera
- Family: Tortricidae
- Genus: Saphenista
- Species: S. incauta

Binomial name
- Saphenista incauta Razowski & Becker, 1986

Species of moth

Saphenista incauta is a species of moth of the family Tortricidae. It is found in Costa Rica. The species' scientific name was first validly published in 1986 by Razowski & Becker.
