= Saphenista ambidextria =

Scientific classification
- Kingdom: Animalia
- Phylum: Arthropoda
- Class: Insecta
- Order: Lepidoptera
- Family: Tortricidae
- Genus: Saphenista
- Species: S. ambidextria

Binomial name
- Saphenista ambidextria Razowski, 1994

Species of moth

Saphenista ambidextria is a species of moth of the family Tortricidae. It is found in Mexico in the states of Tamaulipas and Veracruz.
