= Saphenista parvimaculana =

Scientific classification
- Domain: Eukaryota
- Kingdom: Animalia
- Phylum: Arthropoda
- Class: Insecta
- Order: Lepidoptera
- Family: Tortricidae
- Genus: Saphenista
- Species: S. parvimaculana

Binomial name
- Saphenista parvimaculana (Walsingham, 1879)

Synonyms
- Cochylis parvimaculana Walsingham, 1879; Platphalonidia parvimaculana

Species of moth

Saphenista parvimaculana is a species of moth of the family Tortricidae. It is found in California, United States.

The wingspan is about 11 mm.
