= Saphenista nuda =

Scientific classification
- Kingdom: Animalia
- Phylum: Arthropoda
- Clade: Pancrustacea
- Class: Insecta
- Order: Lepidoptera
- Family: Tortricidae
- Genus: Saphenista
- Species: S. nuda

Binomial name
- Saphenista nuda Razowski & Becker, 1999

Species of moth

Saphenista nuda is a species of moth of the family Tortricidae. It is found in Carchi Province, Ecuador.
