= Saphenista storthingoloba =

Scientific classification
- Domain: Eukaryota
- Kingdom: Animalia
- Phylum: Arthropoda
- Class: Insecta
- Order: Lepidoptera
- Family: Tortricidae
- Genus: Saphenista
- Species: S. storthingoloba

Binomial name
- Saphenista storthingoloba Razowski, 1992

Species of moth

Saphenista storthingoloba is a species of moth of the family Tortricidae. It is found in Costa Rica.
