= Saphenista peraviae =

Scientific classification
- Domain: Eukaryota
- Kingdom: Animalia
- Phylum: Arthropoda
- Class: Insecta
- Order: Lepidoptera
- Family: Tortricidae
- Genus: Saphenista
- Species: S. peraviae

Binomial name
- Saphenista peraviae Razowski, 1994

Species of moth

Saphenista peraviae is a species of moth of the family Tortricidae. It is found in the Dominican Republic.
