= Saphenista leuconigra =

Scientific classification
- Kingdom: Animalia
- Phylum: Arthropoda
- Class: Insecta
- Order: Lepidoptera
- Family: Tortricidae
- Genus: Saphenista
- Species: S. leuconigra

Binomial name
- Saphenista leuconigra Razowski & Wojtusiak, 2008

Species of moth

Saphenista leuconigra is a species of moth of the family Tortricidae. It is found in Carchi Province, Ecuador.

The wingspan is about 26 mm.
