= Saphenista rafaeliana =

Scientific classification
- Kingdom: Animalia
- Phylum: Arthropoda
- Class: Insecta
- Order: Lepidoptera
- Family: Tortricidae
- Genus: Saphenista
- Species: S. rafaeliana

Binomial name
- Saphenista rafaeliana Razowski, 1989

Species of moth

Saphenista rafaeliana is a species of moth of the family Tortricidae. It is found in Colombia.
