= Agoristenidae =

Scientific classification
- Domain: Eukaryota
- Kingdom: Animalia
- Phylum: Arthropoda
- Subphylum: Chelicerata
- Class: Arachnida
- Order: Opiliones
- Superfamily: Gonyleptoidea
- Genus: Agoristenidae; Šilhavý, 1973

Species
- see text

Diversity
- 27 genera, > 78 species

Family of harvestmen/daddy longlegs

Agoristenidae are a neotropical harvestman family of the Suborder Laniatores, in the superfamily Gonyleptoidea.

== Name ==
The name of the type genus is a combination of Ancient Greek agora "gathering" and stenos "few", referring to the rarity of the family at the time of its discovery.

== Description ==
These harvestmen range in body length from two to about five millimeters. Their coloring ranges from yellowish to dark brown. Some show yellow stripes or white or green patches.

== Distribution ==
The subfamily Agoristeninae is endemic to the Greater Antilles. The other subfamilies have been found from northern South America.

== Relationships ==
In older schemes, the now obsolete "Zamorinae" were the basal clade, with Agoristeninae and Leiosteninae as sister groups. Agoristeninae is sister group to all Gonyleptoidea except Stygnopsidae.

- Stygnopsidae
- - Agoristenidae
    - "Zamorinae"
    - - Agoristeninae
      - Leiosteninae
  - other Gonyleptoidea

(after Kury 1997b, 1997c)

== Species ==
=== Agoristeninae ===
- Agoristenus Silhavy, 1973
  - Agoristenus cubanus Silhavy, 1973 — Cuba
  - Agoristenus haitensis Silhavy, 1973 — Haiti
- Ahotta Silhavy, 1973
  - Ahotta hispaniolica Silhavy, 1973 — Hispaniola
- Calmotrinus Silhavy, 1973
  - Calmotrinus turquinensis Silhavy, 1973 — Cuba
- Dumitrescuella Avram, 1977
  - Dumitrescuella ornata Avram, 1977 — Cuba
- Haitimera Silhavy, 1973
  - Haitimera paeninsularis Silhavy, 1973 — Hispaniola
- Lichirtes Silhavy, 1973
  - Lichirtes hexapodoides Silhavy, 1973 — Cuba
- Meriosfera Silhavy, 1973
  - Meriosfera gertschi Silhavy, 1973 — Hispaniola
  - Meriosfera lineata Silhavy, 1973 — Hispaniola
- Orghidaniella Avram, 1977
  - Orghidaniella granpiedrae Avram, 1977 — Cuba
- Piratrinus Silhavy, 1973
  - Piratrinus calcaratus Silhavy, 1973 — Cuba
- Torreana Avram, 1977
  - Torreana poeyi Avram, 1977 — Cuba
  - Torreana spinata Avram, 1977 — Cuba
- Vampyrostenus Silhavy, 1976
  - Vampyrostenus kratochvili Silhavy, 1976 — Puerto Rico
- Yunquenus Silhavy, 1973
  - Yunquenus portoricanus Silhavy, 1973 — Puerto Rico

=== Globibuninae ===
- Globibunus Roewer, 1912
  - Globibunus rubrofemoratus Roewer, 1912 — Ecuador
- Rivetinus Roewer, 1914
  - Rivetinus minutus Roewer, 1914 — Ecuador
  - Rivetinus vulcanus Kury, 1997 — Ecuador
- Sabanilla Roewer, 1913
  - Sabanilla ornata Roewer, 1913 — Venezuela [Colombia?, Ecuador?]

=== Leiosteninae ===
- Andrescava Roewer, 1957
  - Andrescava sturmi Roewer, 1963 — Colombia
  - Andrescava weyrauchi Roewer, 1957 — Peru
- Avima Roewer, 1949 [Contra preoccupied Trinella (!After Hallan)].
  - Avima albidecorata (Silhavy, 1979) — Venezuela
  - Avima albimaculata (González-Sponga, 1998) — Venezuela
  - Avima albiornata (Goodnight & Goodnight, 1947) — Trinidad & Tobago
  - Avima anitas Porto & Colmenares, 2014 — Brazil (!After Hallan)
  - Avima azulitai (Rambla, 1978) — Venezuela
  - Avima bicoloripes Roewer, 1949 — Brazil
  - Avima bordoni (Muñoz-Cuevas, 1975) — Venezuela
  - Avima bubonica (González-Sponga, 1987) — Venezuela
  - Avima chapmani (Rambla, 1978) — Venezuela
  - Avima checkeleyi (Rambla, 1978) — Venezuela
  - Avima chiguaraensis (González-Sponga, 1987) — Venezuela
  - Avima falconensis (González-Sponga, 1987) — Venezuela
  - Avima flavomaculata (González-Sponga, 1987) — Venezuela
  - Avima glabrata (González-Sponga, 1998) — Venezuela
  - Avima granulosa (González-Sponga, 1998) — Venezuela [Caution, later misspelling as "Avima granulata" in some publications)
  - Avima intermedia (Goodnight & Goodnight, 1947) — Trinidad & Tobago
  - Avima matintaperera (Pinto-da-Rocha, 1996) — Brazil
  - Avima naranjoi (Soares & Avram, 1981) — Venezuela
  - Avima octomaculata (Roewer, 1963) — Peru
  - Avima olmosa Roewer, 1956 — Peru
  - Avima palpogranulosa (González-Sponga, 1981) — Venezuela
  - Avima quadrata (González-Sponga, 1987) — Venezuela
  - Avima scabra (Roewer, 1963) — Colombia
  - Avima severa (Soares & Avram, 1981) — Venezuela
  - Avima soaresorum (Pinto-da-Rocha, 1996) — Brazil
  - Avima subparamera (González-Sponga, 1987) — Venezuela
  - Avima troglobia Rocha, 1996 — Venezuela
  - Avima tuttifrutti García & Pastrana-Montiel, 2021 — Colombia
  - Avima venezuelica Soares & Avram, 1981 — Venezuela
  - Avima wayuunaiki García, González Vargas & Gutiérrez Estrada, 2022 — Colombia
- Barinas González-Sponga, 1987
  - Barinas flava González-Sponga, 1987 — Venezuela
  - Barinas guanenta García & Ahumada-C., 2022 — Colombia
  - Barinas piragua Ahumada-C. & García, 2020 — Colombia
  - Barinas virginis (González-Sponga, 1987) — Venezuela
- Barlovento González-Sponga, 1987
  - Barlovento albapatella González-Sponga, 1987 — Venezuela
  - Barlovento littorei González-Sponga, 1987 — Venezuela
  - Barlovento marmoratus (González-Sponga, 1981) — Venezuela [!Note: Altered suffix]
  - Barlovento salmeronensis González-Sponga, 1987 — Venezuela
- Leptostygnus Mello-Leitão, 1940
  - Leptostygnus leptochirus Mello-Leitão, 1940 — Colombia
  - Leptostygnus marchantiarum (González-Sponga, 1987) — Venezuela
  - Leptostygnus yarigui García & Villarreal, 2020 — Colombia
- Muscopilio Villarreal & García, 2021
  - Muscopilio onod Villarreal & García, 2021 — Colombia
- Nemastygnus Roewer, 1929
  - Nemastygnus ovalis Roewer, 1929 — Colombia
- Ocoita González-Sponga, 1987
  - Ocoita mina González-Sponga, 1987 — Venezuela
  - Ocoita tapipensis González-Sponga, 1987 — Venezuela (= syn. Ocoita servae González-Sponga, 1987)
- Paravima Caporiacco, 1951
  - Paravima goodnightorum Caporiacco, 1951 — Venezuela (= syn. Paravima flumencaurimarensis González-Sponga, 1987)
  - Paravima locumida González-Sponga, 1987 — Venezuela
  - Paravima lokura García & Villarreal, 2023 — Colombia
  - Paravima magistri García & Villarreal, 2023 — Colombia
  - Paravima morritomacairensis González-Sponga, 1987 — Venezuela
  - Paravima plana (Goodnight & Goodnight, 1949) — Venezuela
  - Paravima propespelunca González-Sponga, 1987 (= syn. Paravima acanthoconus Villarreal & DoNascimiento, 2005)
  - Paravima quirozi (González-Sponga, 1981) — Venezuela
  - Paravima totoro García & Villarreal, 2023 — Venezuela
- Taulisa Roewer, 1956
  - Taulisa koepckei Roewer, 1956 — Peru
- Vima Hirst, 1912
  - Vima insignis Hirst, 1912 — Guyana [? Brazil]

=== Agoristenidae Insertae sedis ===
- Micrisaeus Roewer, 1957
  - Micrisaeus gracillimus Roewer, 1957 — Peru

Excluded from Agoristenidae, now placed elsewhere:

- For Palcabius Roewer, 1956, see Gonyleptoidea Insertae sedis
  - Palcabius palpalis Roewer, 1956 — Peru
- For Ramonus Roewer, 1956, see Gonyleptoidea Insertae sedis
  - Ramonus conifrons Roewer, 1956 — Peru
- For Zamora Roewer, 1927, see Nomoclastidae
