= Saphenista livida =

Scientific classification
- Domain: Eukaryota
- Kingdom: Animalia
- Phylum: Arthropoda
- Class: Insecta
- Order: Lepidoptera
- Family: Tortricidae
- Genus: Saphenista
- Species: S. livida

Binomial name
- Saphenista livida Razowski, 1986

Species of moth

Saphenista livida is a species of moth of the family Tortricidae. It is found in Durango, Mexico.
