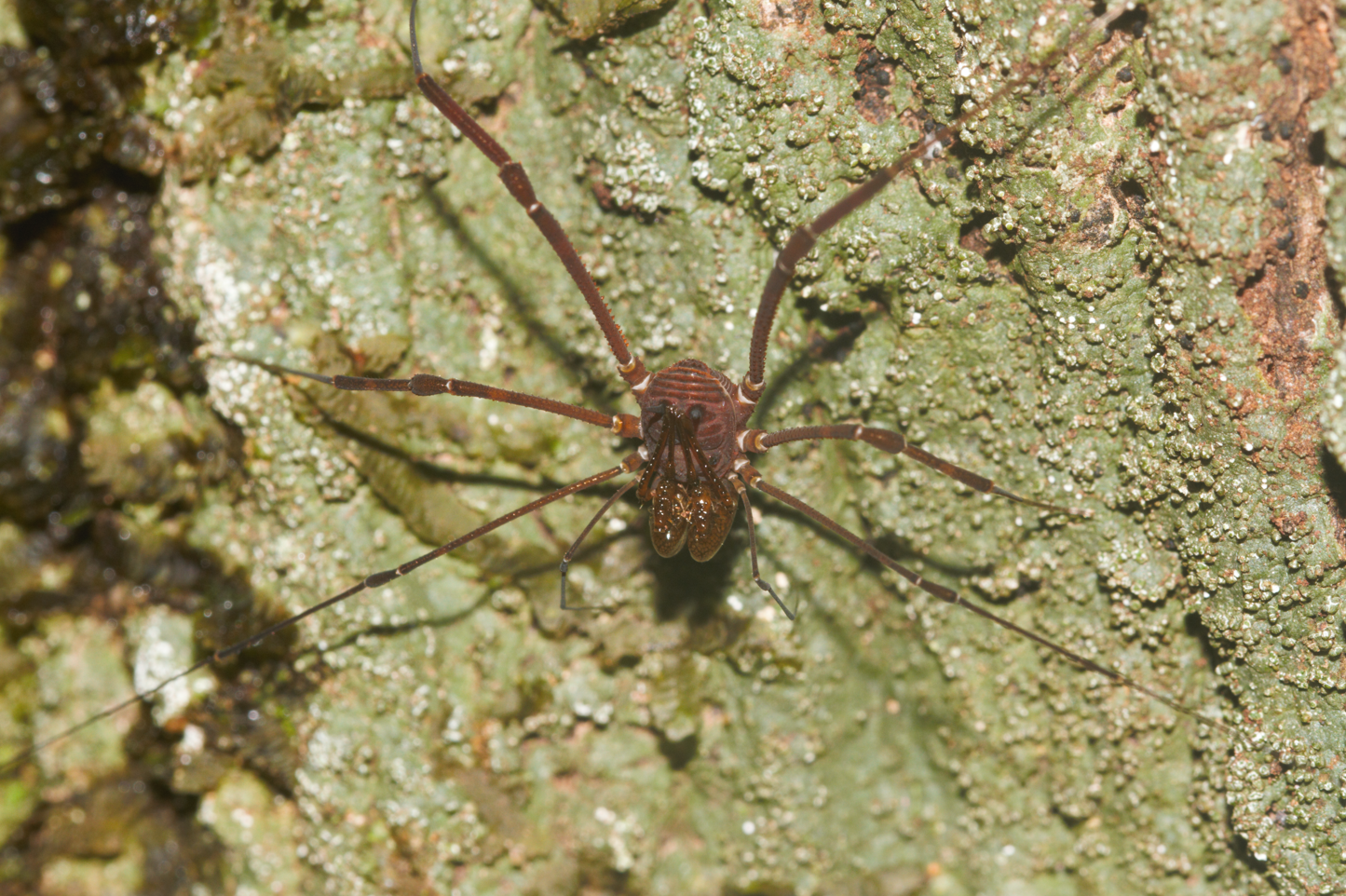
- Protimesius gracilis

Scientific classification
- Domain: Eukaryota
- Kingdom: Animalia
- Phylum: Arthropoda
- Subphylum: Chelicerata
- Class: Arachnida
- Order: Opiliones
- Suborder: Laniatores
- Infraorder: Grassatores
- Superfamily: Gonyleptoidea
- Family: Stygnidae; Simon, 1879

Diversity
- c. 30 genera, > 70 species

= Stygnidae =

Family of harvestmen/daddy longlegs

The Stygnidae are a family of neotropical harvestmen within the suborder Laniatores.

== Name ==
The name of the type genus is derived from Ancient Greek stygnos "diabolic being".

== Description ==
Body length ranges from about one to six millimeters. The color ranges from light brown to reddish. Some Heterostygninae have white patches, stripes or spots on the dorsal scutum.

== Distribution ==
The Heterostygninae are found in the Lesser Antilles, Nomoclastinae are endemic to Colombia, and the Stygninae live from north of the Tropic of Capricorn (central South America). Most species live in the Amazonian rainforest. However, half the species have only been collected once, so distribution of species is poorly known.

== Relationships ==
The Stygnidae are sister to Cosmetidae and Gonyleptidae, and belong to the same group inside Gonyleptoidea as these and Cranaidae and Manaosbiidae. The Stygnidae are monophyletic.

== Genera ==
See the List of Stygnidae species for a list of currently described species.

Heterostygninae Roewer, 1913

- Eutimesius Roewer, 1913
- Imeri Pinto-da-Rocha & Tourinho, 2012
- Innoxius Pinto-da-Rocha, 1997
- Minax Pinto-da-Rocha, 1997
- Stenostygnellus Roewer, 1913
- Stygnidius Simon, 1879
- Stygnoplus Simon, 1879
- Timesius Simon, 1879
- Yapacana Pinto-da-Rocha, 1997

Stygninae Simon, 1879

- Actinostygnoides Goodnight & Goodnight, 1942
- Auranus Mello-Leitão, 1941
- Fortia Villarreal et al., 2022
- Iguarassua Roewer, 1943
- Jabbastygnus Kury & Villarreal, 2015
- Kaapora Pinto-da-Rocha, 1997
- Metaphareus Roewer, 1912
- Niceforoiellus Mello-Leitão, 1941
- Obidosus Roewer, 1931
- Ortonia Wood, 1869
- Paraphareus Goodnight & Goodnight, 1943
- Phareus Simon, 1879
- Pickeliana Mello-Leitão, 1932
- Planophareus Goodnight & Goodnight, 1943
- Protimesius Roewer, 1913
- Ricstygnus Kury, 2009
- Sickesia Soares, 1979
- Stenophareus Goodnight & Goodnight, 1943
- Stenostygnoides Roewer, 1913
- Stygnus Perty, 1833
- Verrucastygnus Pinto-da-Rocha, 1997

Incertae sedis:

- Gaibulus Roewer, 1943

--- Else see Nomoclastinae Roewer, 1943 including Nomoclastes Sørensen, 1932 => Nomoclastidae
