= Saphenista lacteipalpis =

Scientific classification
- Kingdom: Animalia
- Phylum: Arthropoda
- Class: Insecta
- Order: Lepidoptera
- Family: Tortricidae
- Genus: Saphenista
- Species: S. lacteipalpis

Binomial name
- Saphenista lacteipalpis (Walsingham, 1891)

Synonyms
- Conchylis lacteipalpis Walsingham, 1891; Phalonidia lactaipalpis Razowski, 1967

Species of moth

Saphenista lacteipalpis is a species of moth of the family Tortricidae. It is found on St. Vincent in the West Indies.
