= Saphenista euprepia =

Scientific classification
- Kingdom: Animalia
- Phylum: Arthropoda
- Clade: Pancrustacea
- Class: Insecta
- Order: Lepidoptera
- Family: Tortricidae
- Genus: Saphenista
- Species: S. euprepia

Binomial name
- Saphenista euprepia Razowski, 1993

Species of moth

Saphenista euprepia is a species of moth of the family Tortricidae. It is found in Ecuador (Carchi Province) and Peru.
