= Saphenista nomonana =

Scientific classification
- Domain: Eukaryota
- Kingdom: Animalia
- Phylum: Arthropoda
- Class: Insecta
- Order: Lepidoptera
- Family: Tortricidae
- Genus: Saphenista
- Species: S. nomonana

Binomial name
- Saphenista nomonana (Kearfott, 1907)

Synonyms
- Phalonia nomonana Kearfott, 1907; Phalonia voluntaria Meyrick, 1912

Species of moth

Saphenista nomonana is a species of moth of the family Tortricidae. It is found in California, United States.

Adults are on wing in April and May.
