= Saphenista contermina =

Scientific classification
- Kingdom: Animalia
- Phylum: Arthropoda
- Clade: Pancrustacea
- Class: Insecta
- Order: Lepidoptera
- Family: Tortricidae
- Genus: Saphenista
- Species: S. contermina

Binomial name
- Saphenista contermina Razowski & Becker, 2002

Species of moth

Saphenista contermina is a species of moth of the family Tortricidae. It is found in Ecuador in the provinces of Tungurahua and Morona-Santiago.

The wingspan is 13 mm for males and 15 mm for females.
