= Saphenista orichalcana =

Scientific classification
- Kingdom: Animalia
- Phylum: Arthropoda
- Clade: Pancrustacea
- Class: Insecta
- Order: Lepidoptera
- Family: Tortricidae
- Genus: Saphenista
- Species: S. orichalcana

Binomial name
- Saphenista orichalcana Razowski & Becker, 1986

Species of moth

Saphenista orichalcana is a species of moth of the family Tortricidae. It is found in Costa Rica.
