= Saphenista novaelimae =

Scientific classification
- Kingdom: Animalia
- Phylum: Arthropoda
- Clade: Pancrustacea
- Class: Insecta
- Order: Lepidoptera
- Family: Tortricidae
- Genus: Saphenista
- Species: S. novaelimae

Binomial name
- Saphenista novaelimae Razowski & Becker, 2007

Species of moth

Saphenista novaelimae is a species of moth of the family Tortricidae. It is found in Nova Lima, Brazil.

The wingspan is about 12 millimetres (0.47 in).

== Etymology ==
The species name refers to the type locality, Nova Lima.
