= Saphenista substructa =

Scientific classification
- Kingdom: Animalia
- Phylum: Arthropoda
- Class: Insecta
- Order: Lepidoptera
- Family: Tortricidae
- Genus: Saphenista
- Species: S. substructa

Binomial name
- Saphenista substructa (Meyrick, 1927)

Synonyms
- Phtheochroa substructa Meyrick, 1927

Species of moth

Saphenista substructa is a species of moth of the family Tortricidae. It is found in Colombia.
