= Saphenista chlorfascia =

Scientific classification
- Kingdom: Animalia
- Phylum: Arthropoda
- Clade: Pancrustacea
- Class: Insecta
- Order: Lepidoptera
- Family: Tortricidae
- Genus: Saphenista
- Species: S. chlorfascia

Binomial name
- Saphenista chlorfascia Razowski & Becker, 2007

Synonyms
- Saphenista chorfascia Razowski & Becker, 2007

Species of moth

Saphenista chlorfascia is a species of moth in the family Tortricidae. It is found in Morona-Santiago Province, Ecuador.

The wingspan is about 18 mm.
