= Saphenista rufozodion =

Scientific classification
- Kingdom: Animalia
- Phylum: Arthropoda
- Clade: Pancrustacea
- Class: Insecta
- Order: Lepidoptera
- Family: Tortricidae
- Genus: Saphenista
- Species: S. rufozodion

Binomial name
- Saphenista rufozodion Razowski & Becker, 2002

Species of moth

Saphenista rufozodion is a species of moth of the family Tortricidae. It is found in Carchi Province, Ecuador.

The wingspan is about 11 mm.
