= Stygnopsidae =

Scientific classification
- Kingdom: Animalia
- Phylum: Arthropoda
- Subphylum: Chelicerata
- Class: Arachnida
- Order: Opiliones
- Superfamily: Gonyleptoidea
- Family: Stygnopsidae; Sørensen, 1932

Species
- see text

Diversity
- 8 genera, c. 40 species

Family of harvestmen/daddy longlegs

The Stygnopsidae are a small family of harvestmen, with almost all species found in Mexico.

== Name ==
The name of the type genus Stygnopsis is combined from the genus Stygnus (Stygnidae) and Ancient Greek opsis, "looks like".

== Description ==
The body length of these harvestmen ranges from 2.5 (Karos) to 7 mm (Hoplobunus). Their color ranges from dark brown to black, with much lighter appendages. Cave-dwelling species are pale light brown.

== Distribution ==
As in other Laniatores, most species have narrow distributions. Almost all species occur in Mexico, with some found in the southern USA (Hoplobunus), and Guatemala, El Salvador and Belize (Paramitraceras).

== Relationships ==
- Epedanidae
- - Assamiidae
  - - Stygnopsidae
    - other Gonyleptoidea

Proposed phylogeny (after Kury 2003)

Epedanidae could be the sister group to Gonyleptoidea sensu lato (including the Assamiidae), with the Stygnopsidae the sister group to the rest of Gonyleptoidea. Although they reach into the Nearctic, they are more closely related to neotropical harvestmen.

== Species ==
- Hoplobunus Banks, 1900

- Hoplobunus apoalensis Goodnight & Goodnight, 1973 — Mexico
- Hoplobunus barretti Banks, 1900 — Mexico
- Hoplobunus boneti (Goodnight & Goodnight, 1942) — cave, Mexico
- Hoplobunus madlae Goodnight & Goodnight, 1967 — Texas
- Hoplobunus mexicanus (Roewer, 1915) — Mexico
- Hoplobunus mexicanus (Sørensen, 1932) — praeoccuppied; Mexico
- Hoplobunus oaxacensis Goodnight & Goodnight, 1973 — Mexico
- Hoplobunus osorioi (Goodnight & Goodnight, 1944) — Mexico
- Hoplobunus planus Goodnight & Goodnight, 1973 — Mexico
- Hoplobunus queretarius Silhavy 1974 — Mexico
- Hoplobunus russelli Goodnight & Goodnight, 1967 — Texas
- Hoplobunus spinooculorum Goodnight & Goodnight, 1973 — Mexico
- Hoplobunus zullinii Silhavy 1977 — Mexico

- Karos Goodnight & Goodnight, 1944 — Mexico

- Karos barbarikos Goodnight & Goodnight, 1944
- Karos brignolii Silhavy 1974
- Karos depressus Goodnight & Goodnight, 1971
- Karos dybasi (Goodnight & Goodnight, 1947)
- Karos foliorum (Goodnight & Goodnight, 1945)
- Karos gratiosus Goodnight & Goodnight, 1971
- Karos parvus Goodnight & Goodnight, 1971
- Karos projectus Goodnight & Goodnight, 1971
- Karos rugosus Goodnight & Goodnight, 1971
- Karos tuberculatus (Goodnight & Goodnight, 1944)
- Karos unispinosus (Goodnight & Goodnight, 1946)

- Mexotroglinus Silhavy, 1977

- Mexotroglinus sbordonii Silhavy, 1977 — Mexico

- Paramitraceras F. O. P-Cambridge, 1905

- Paramitraceras femoralis Goodnight & Goodnight, 1953 — Mexico
- Paramitraceras granulatus F. O. Pickard-Cambridge, 1905 — Guatemala, El Salvador, Mexico
- Paramitraceras hispidulus F. O. Pickard-Cambridge, 1905 — Guatemala, Belize, Mexico

- Sbordonia Silhavy 1977 — Mexico

- Sbordonia armigera Silhavy 1977
- Sbordonia parvula (Goodnight & Goodnight, 1953)

- Stygnopsis Sørensen, 1902 — Mexico

- Stygnopsis robusta (Goodnight & Goodnight, 1971)
- Stygnopsis valida (Sørensen, 1884)

- Tampiconus Roewer, 1949

- Tampiconus philippii Roewer, 1949 — Mexico

- Troglostygnopsis Silhavy, 1974 — Mexico

- Troglostygnopsis anophthalma Silhavy, 1974
- Troglostygnopsis inops (Goodnight & Goodnight, 1971)
