= Saphenista solisae =

Scientific classification
- Kingdom: Animalia
- Phylum: Arthropoda
- Clade: Pancrustacea
- Class: Insecta
- Order: Lepidoptera
- Family: Tortricidae
- Genus: Saphenista
- Species: S. solisae

Binomial name
- Saphenista solisae Razowski & Becker, 2007

Species of moth

Saphenista solisae is a species of moth of the family Tortricidae. It is found in Tamaulipas, Mexico.

The wingspan is about 9.5 mm.

== Etymology ==
The species is named after Maria Alma Solis.
