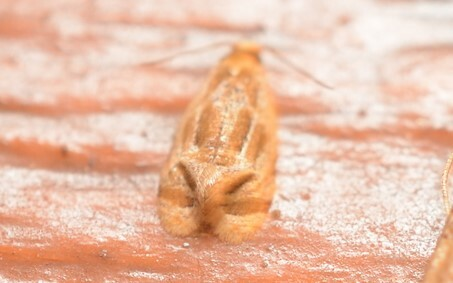

Scientific classification
- Domain: Eukaryota
- Kingdom: Animalia
- Phylum: Arthropoda
- Class: Insecta
- Order: Lepidoptera
- Family: Tortricidae
- Genus: Saphenista
- Species: S. multistrigata

Binomial name
- Saphenista multistrigata Walsingham, 1914

= Saphenista multistrigata =

Species of moth

Saphenista multistrigata is a species of moth in the family Tortricidae. It is found in Veracruz, Mexico.
