= Saphenista penai =

Scientific classification
- Kingdom: Animalia
- Phylum: Arthropoda
- Class: Insecta
- Order: Lepidoptera
- Family: Tortricidae
- Genus: Saphenista
- Species: S. penai

Binomial name
- Saphenista penai (Clarke, 1968)

Synonyms
- Amallectis penai Clarke, 1968

Species of moth

Saphenista penai is a species of moth of the family Tortricidae. It is found in Ecuador (Pichincha Province), Bolivia and Peru.
