= Saphenista lassa =

Scientific classification
- Domain: Eukaryota
- Kingdom: Animalia
- Phylum: Arthropoda
- Class: Insecta
- Order: Lepidoptera
- Family: Tortricidae
- Genus: Saphenista
- Species: S. lassa

Binomial name
- Saphenista lassa (Razowski, 1986)

Synonyms
- Aethes lassa Razowski, 1986

Species of moth

Saphenista lassa is a species of moth of the family Tortricidae. It is found in Sinaloa, Mexico.
