= Saphenista peruviana =

Scientific classification
- Kingdom: Animalia
- Phylum: Arthropoda
- Class: Insecta
- Order: Lepidoptera
- Family: Tortricidae
- Genus: Saphenista
- Species: S. peruviana

Binomial name
- Saphenista peruviana Razowski, 1993

Species of moth

Saphenista peruviana is a species of moth of the family Tortricidae. It is found in Peru.
