= Saphenista muerta =

Scientific classification
- Kingdom: Animalia
- Phylum: Arthropoda
- Clade: Pancrustacea
- Class: Insecta
- Order: Lepidoptera
- Family: Tortricidae
- Genus: Saphenista
- Species: S. muerta

Binomial name
- Saphenista muerta Nishida & Adamski, 2004

Species of moth

Saphenista muerta is a species of moth of the family Tortricidae. It is found in Costa Rica.

The length of the forewings is about 7 mm.

== Etymology ==
The species name refers to Cerro de la Muerte, the type locality.
