= Saphenista praefasciata =

Scientific classification
- Kingdom: Animalia
- Phylum: Arthropoda
- Class: Insecta
- Order: Lepidoptera
- Family: Tortricidae
- Genus: Saphenista
- Species: S. praefasciata

Binomial name
- Saphenista praefasciata (Meyrick, 1932)

Synonyms
- Phalonia praefasciata Meyrick, 1932

Species of moth

Saphenista praefasciata is a species of moth of the family Tortricidae. It is found in Costa Rica. It was first described in 1932.
