= Barlavento =

Barlavento is a Portuguese word meaning "windward". It is used in several geographic features:

- Barlavento Islands — the northern group of Cape Verde islands
- Barlavento Algarvio — the western part of the Algarve region, in Portugal

== See also ==
- Barlovento (disambiguation), the Spanish language equivalent
