= Saphenista brunneomaculata =

Scientific classification
- Kingdom: Animalia
- Phylum: Arthropoda
- Class: Insecta
- Order: Lepidoptera
- Family: Tortricidae
- Genus: Saphenista
- Species: S. brunneomaculata

Binomial name
- Saphenista brunneomaculata Razowski & Wojtusiak, 2008

Species of moth

Saphenista brunneomaculata is a species of moth of the family Tortricidae. It is found in Pichincha Province, Ecuador.

The wingspan is about 18 mm.
