= Saphenista pruinosana =

Scientific classification
- Kingdom: Animalia
- Phylum: Arthropoda
- Clade: Pancrustacea
- Class: Insecta
- Order: Lepidoptera
- Family: Tortricidae
- Genus: Saphenista
- Species: S. pruinosana

Binomial name
- Saphenista pruinosana (Zeller, 1877)

Synonyms
- Conchylis pruinosana Zeller, 1877

Species of moth

Saphenista pruinosana is a species of moth of the family Tortricidae. It is found in Colombia.
