= Innoxius magnus =

Species of harvestman/daddy longlegs

Innoxius magnus is a harvestman from the genus Innoxius and the family Stygnidae. It was first described by Ludovico di Caporiacco in 1951.
