= Saphenista pyrczi =

Scientific classification
- Domain: Eukaryota
- Kingdom: Animalia
- Phylum: Arthropoda
- Class: Insecta
- Order: Lepidoptera
- Family: Tortricidae
- Genus: Saphenista
- Species: S. pyrczi

Binomial name
- Saphenista pyrczi Razowski & Wojtusiak, 2009

Species of moth

Saphenista pyrczi is a species of moth of the family Tortricidae. It is found in Napo Province, Ecuador.

The wingspan is about 24 mm.

== Etymology ==
The species is named for Dr. Tomasz Pyrcz.
