= Saphenista lathridia =

Scientific classification
- Kingdom: Animalia
- Phylum: Arthropoda
- Clade: Pancrustacea
- Class: Insecta
- Order: Lepidoptera
- Family: Tortricidae
- Genus: Saphenista
- Species: S. lathridia

Binomial name
- Saphenista lathridia Razowski & Becker, 1986

Species of moth

Saphenista lathridia is a species of moth of the family Tortricidae. It is found in Costa Rica.
