= Saphenista absidata =

Scientific classification
- Domain: Eukaryota
- Kingdom: Animalia
- Phylum: Arthropoda
- Class: Insecta
- Order: Lepidoptera
- Family: Tortricidae
- Genus: Saphenista
- Species: S. absidata

Binomial name
- Saphenista absidata Razowski, 1994

Species of moth

Saphenista absidata is a species of moth of the family Tortricidae. It was described by Józef Razowski in 1994. It is found in Sinaloa, Mexico.
