= Luis Chiriboga Izquierdo =

Ecuadorian writer

Luis Alfonso Chiriboga Izquierdo is an Ecuadorian writer. He was born in Puerto Baquerizo on April 29, 1946.

== Career ==
He studied philosophy at the University of Zulia in Maracaibo, Venezuela. He went on to obtain a doctorate from the Sorbonne, and then taught philosophy at the Rafael María Baralt University in the city of Cabimas, Venezuela. He has also been a visiting professor at the Adam Mickiewicz University in Poznan. He has published among others: Los jardines del crepúsculo, Un sol de palabras, Poesía a la Intemperie, En busca de Octavio Paz, and La rosa de los vientos

== Works ==
- 1983 - Los jardines del crepúsculo (poetry)
- 2001 - Un sol de palabras (poetry)
- 2011 - Poesía a la intemperie (poetry)
- 2012 - Oficina 29 (prose)
- 2013 - En busca de Octavio Paz (essay)
- 2018 - La Rosa de los vientos (novel)
- 2019 - Grietas en la Sombra (poetry)
- 2019 - El Gurú y Otras Narraciones Insólitas (prose)
