= Prostygnidae =

Scientific classification
- Domain: Eukaryota
- Kingdom: Animalia
- Phylum: Arthropoda
- Subphylum: Chelicerata
- Class: Arachnida
- Order: Opiliones
- Suborder: Laniatores
- Infraorder: Grassatores
- Superfamily: Gonyleptoidea
- Family: Prostygnidae; Roewer, 1913

Species
- See text

Family of harvestmen/daddy longlegs

Prostygnidae are a neotropical harvestman family of the Suborder Laniatores, in the superfamily Gonyleptoidea.
