= Saphenista semistrigata =

Scientific classification
- Kingdom: Animalia
- Phylum: Arthropoda
- Clade: Pancrustacea
- Class: Insecta
- Order: Lepidoptera
- Family: Tortricidae
- Genus: Saphenista
- Species: S. semistrigata

Binomial name
- Saphenista semistrigata Forbes, 1931

Species of moth

Saphenista semistrigata is a species of moth of the family Tortricidae. It is found in Puerto Rico. Its wings are olive, black, and cream, in a mottled pattern with a defined olive streak running up the wing.
