= Edmundo Chiriboga =

Ecuadorian war hero (1917–1941)

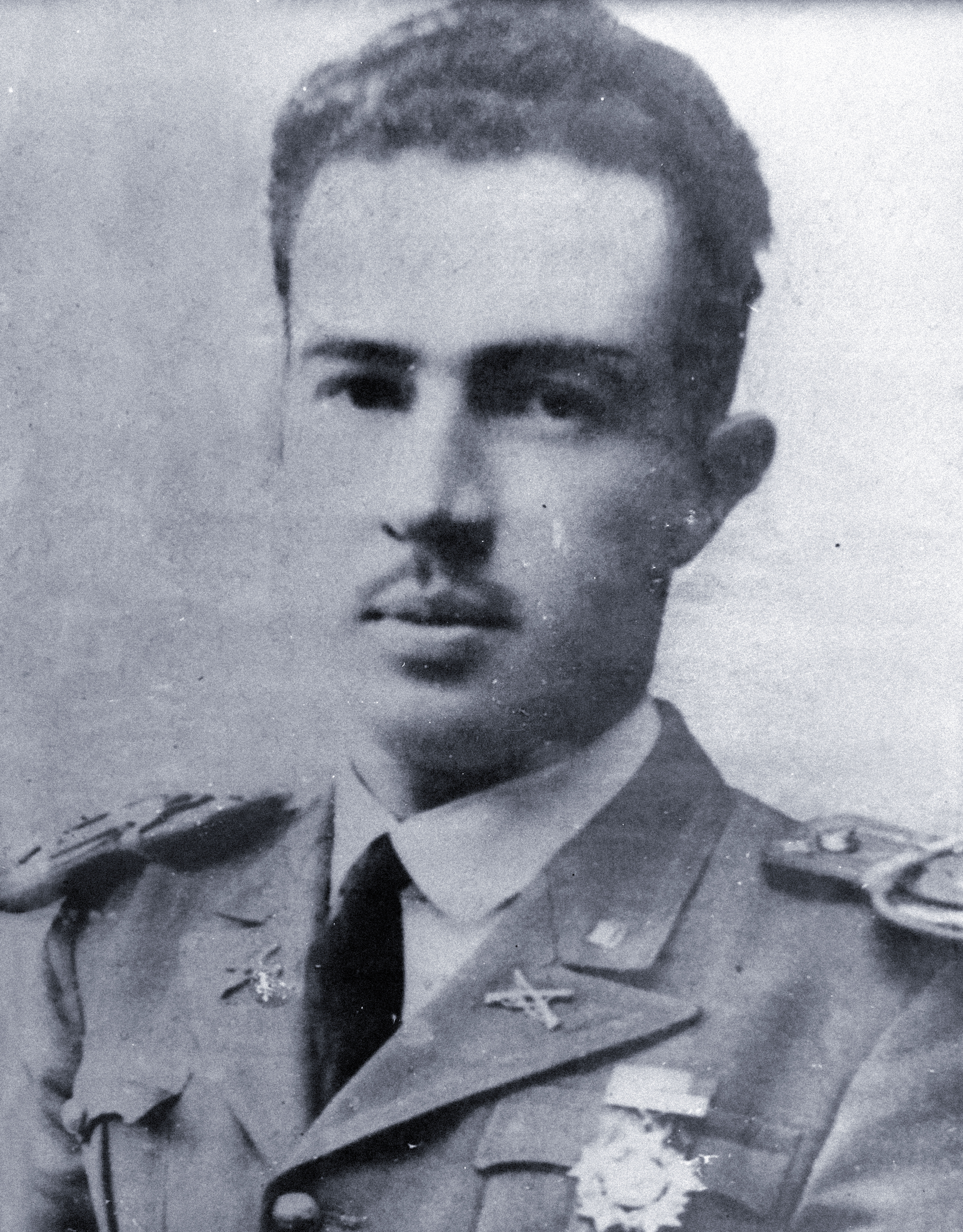
- Born: César Edmundo Chiriboga González; August 17, 1917; Riobamba, Ecuador
- Died: July 30, 1941 (aged 23) Chacras, Ecuador
- Allegiance: Ecuador
- Branch: Ecuadorian Army
- Service years: 1936–1941
- Rank: Captain
- Conflicts: Ecuadorian–Peruvian War: Battle of Chacras †

César Edmundo Chiriboga González (Riobamba, August 17, 1917 — Chacras, July 30, 1941) was an Ecuadorian Army captain who was killed in action during the 1941 Ecuadorian–Peruvian War.

== Early life ==
He was the son of César Augusto Chiriboga Dávalos and Maria González González. His primary education was at the Nicanor Larrea School, and secondary education at the San Felipe Neri School, where he obtained the title of "Baccalaureate in Modern Humanities" on July 18, 1935. Later he traveled to Quito to begin his military life in the Eloy Alfaro Military School.

== Military career ==
In October 1936, he entered the Eloy Alfaro Military School, where he reached the rank of brigadier and second lieutenant; in 1938 he was promoted to Second Lieutenant exercising it in the "Andean Cayambe Battalion" and later he was transferred to Pastaza to the "Rio Corrientes Garrison". On August 12, 1940, he returned to Quito to the 10th Battalion "Infantería del Carchi". He was decorated with the "Abdón Calderón" medal for his services and the following year in October 1941 was sent to Oro Province, to participate in the war between Ecuador and Peru where he already held the rank of Lieutenant.

== Death ==
During the War of 1941, in the Quebrada Seca sector of Chacras, Lieutenant Chiriboga, along with 29 men, confronted Peruvian forces who had surrounded the unit. The Chiriboga Unit ran out of ammunition, and predicting his fate said: "We are Ecuadorians who will die doing our duty." Shortly after they were shot and buried in mass graves, there were 3 survivors. For this act the Government of Ecuador promoted him post-mortem to the rank of captain that year.
