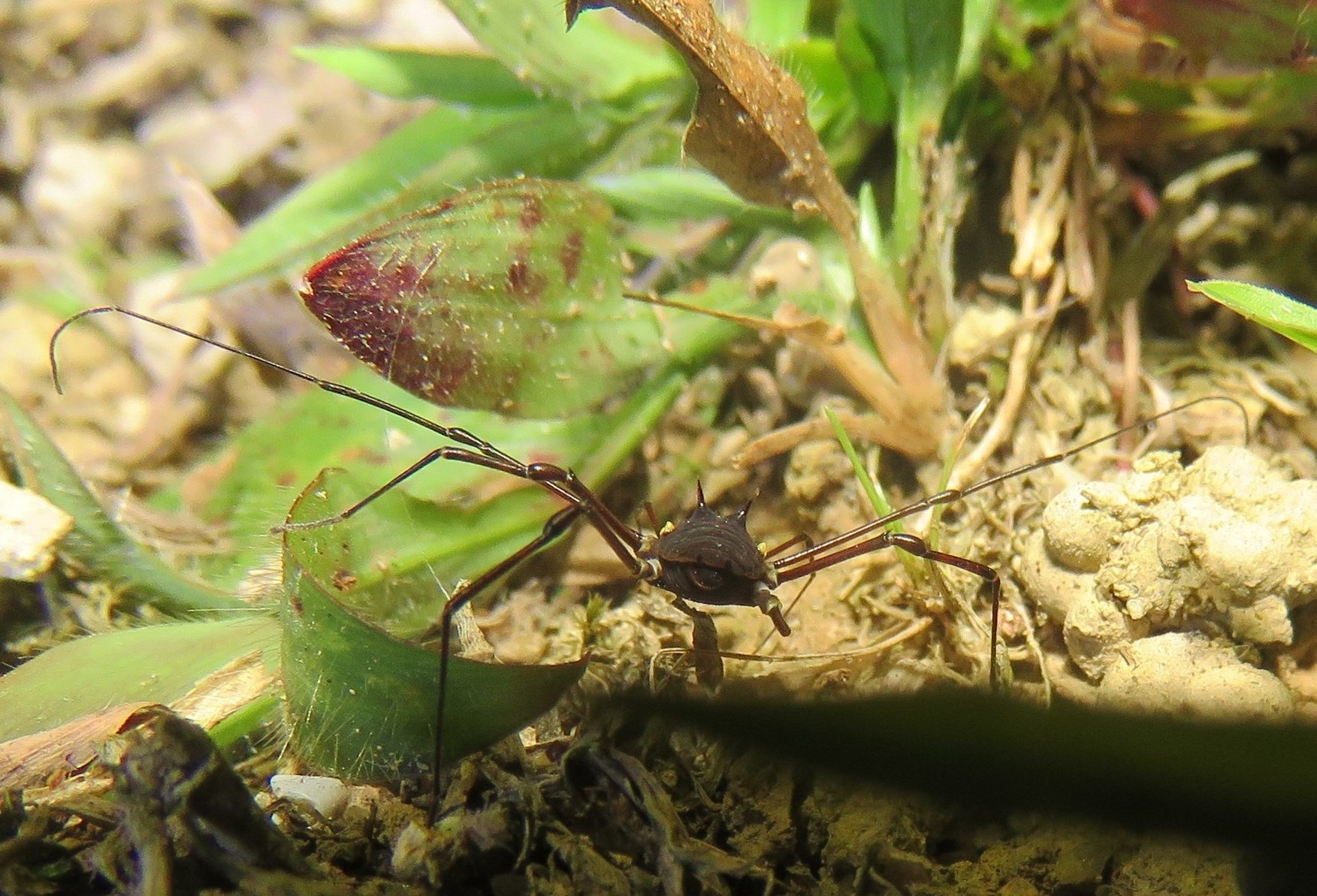

Scientific classification
- Domain: Eukaryota
- Kingdom: Animalia
- Phylum: Arthropoda
- Subphylum: Chelicerata
- Class: Arachnida
- Order: Opiliones
- Family: Nomoclastidae
- Genus: Quindina
- Species: Q. albomarginis

Binomial name
- Quindina albomarginis (Chamberlin, 1925)

Synonyms
- Zygopachylus albomarginis Chamberlin, 1925

= Quindina albomarginis =

Species of harvestman/daddy longlegs

Quindina albomarginis is a species of Neotropical harvestman in the order Opiliones. It is found in the tropical forests of Panama.

== Description ==
As with other harvestmen, Quindina albomarginis has a small body consisting of a cephalothorax fused with an abdomen, raised on four pairs of long legs. The second pair of legs functions as antennae. It has a pair of eyes on either side of the head. The mouthparts are known as stomotheca and can chew solid food in contrast to the spiders, order Araneae, which can only suck fluids from their prey.

== Reproduction ==
The male Quindina albomarginis adopts an unusual strategy at breeding time. He lives on the trunk of a tree where he builds a low-walled enclosure with a level floor about 3 centimetres (1.2 in) across out of mud and fragments of bark. He repairs the area if it gets damaged and prevents the hyphae of fungi from growing across it. When a female approaches and steps into the enclosure they begin a lengthy ritual of leg tapping. She first taps the floor at intervals with one leg and if he accepts her advances he taps her with his legs, otherwise he drives her away with a nip in a soft spot such as a joint in her leg. When accepted, he circles her, tapping her as he does so, and eventually they stand head to head. She grabs his cephalothorax and pulls him forward and he everts his penis and transfers a bundle of sperm into her genital pore. About twenty minutes later, she is ready to deposit her fertilised eggs. The male accompanies her around the enclosure indicating where he wants the eggs placed by further tapping her body and the floor. She bends her legs to partially lower her body and extends her ovipositor to the floor of the enclosure and places an egg there. She then "paddles" with her front feet near the egg which results in it becoming partially buried. She deposits one or two further eggs in the same way then leaves the enclosure.

The male stays on guard. Further females may stray his way and the ritual may be repeated a number of times. If a male approaches he will grapple with it and is usually successful in driving it away. Scouting ants are also repelled, being flicked away. He stays looking after his eggs till they hatch after which he plays no further part in their care.
