= Manaosbiidae =

Scientific classification
- Kingdom: Animalia
- Phylum: Arthropoda
- Subphylum: Chelicerata
- Class: Arachnida
- Order: Opiliones
- Superfamily: Gonyleptoidea
- Family: Manaosbiidae; Roewer, 1943

Genera
- See text

Diversity
- c. 30 genera, c. 50 species

Family of harvestmen/daddy longlegs

The Manaosbiidae are a family of neotropical harvestmen within the suborder Laniatores.

== Name ==
The name of the type genus is combined from Manaus and Ancient Greek bios "living".

== Description ==
Body length ranges from about three to ten millimeters. Most species are dark brown with black mottling. Appendages are in general much lighter, often with dark rings.

== Distribution ==
The Manaosbiidae occur south from Panama, with a southern limit in Mato Grosso do Sul (Brazil). They inhabit lowland Amazonian rainforest up to submontane Andean forests, dry forests in Central America, and riparian forests in Brazil.

== Relationships ==
The relationship of Manaosbiidae with other families within the Gonyleptoidea is unclear.

== Species ==
=== Manaosbiinae ===
- Azulamus Roewer, 1957

- Azulamus scabrissimus Roewer, 1957 – Peru

- Barrona Goodnight & Goodnight, 1942

- Barrona williamsi Goodnight & Goodnight, 1942 – Panama

- Belemnodes Strand, 1942

- Belemnodes scaber (Roewer, 1932)

- Belemulus Roewer, 1932

- Belemulus annulatus Roewer, 1932 – Brazil

- Bugabitia Roewer, 1915

- Bugabitia triacantha Roewer, 1915 – Panama

- Camelianus Roewer, 1912

- Camelianus fuhrmanni Roewer, 1912 – Colombia

- Clavicranaus Roewer, 1915

- Clavicranaus tarsalis Roewer, 1915 – Suriname, Brazil

- Cucutacola Mello-Leitão, 1940

- Cucutacola nigra Mello-Leitão, 1940 – Colombia

- Dibunostra Roewer, 1943

- Dibunostra ypsilon Roewer, 1943 – Venezuela

- Gonogotus Roewer, 1943

- Gonogotus areolatus Roewer, 1943 – Colombia

- Manaosbia Roewer, 1943

- Manaosbia scopulata Roewer, 1943 – Brazil

- Mazarunius Roewer, 1943

- Mazarunius oedipus Roewer, 1943 – Guyana

- Meridia Roewer, 1913

- Meridia palpalis Roewer, 1913 – Venezuela
- Meridia gracilis (Roewer, 1913) – Suriname

- Narcellus Kury & Alonso-Zarazaga, 2011

- Narcellus balthazar (Roewer, 1932) – Windward Islands
- Narcellus montgomeryi (Goodnight & Goodnight, 1947) – Trinidad

- Paramicrocranaus H. Soares, 1970

- Paramicrocranaus difficilis H. Soares, 1970 – Brazil

- Pentacranaus Roewer, 1963

- Pentacranaus niger Roewer, 1963 – Peru

- Poassa Roewer, 1943

- Poassa limbata Roewer, 1943 – Costa Rica

- Poecilocranaus Roewer, 1943

- Poecilocranaus gratiosus Roewer, 1943 – Venezuela

- Rhopalocranaus Roewer, 1913

- Rhopalocranaus albilineatus Roewer, 1932 – Trinidad
- Rhopalocranaus apiculatus Roewer, 1932 – Brazil
- Rhopalocranaus aspersus Roewer, 1932 – Brazil
- Rhopalocranaus atroluteus Roewer, 1913 – Colombia
- Rhopalocranaus bordoni Silhavy, 1979 – Venezuela
- Rhopalocranaus crulsi Mello-Leitão, 1932
- Rhopalocranaus festae Roewer, 1925 – Ecuador
- Rhopalocranaus gracilis Roewer, 1913 – Venezuela
- Rhopalocranaus limbatus (Schenkel, 1953) – Venezuela
- Rhopalocranaus marginatus Roewer, 1913 – French Guiana, Brazil
- Rhopalocranaus robustus Goodnight & Goodnight, 1942 — Guyana
- Rhopalocranaus tenuis (Roewer, 1943) – Suriname
- Rhopalocranaus tuberculatus Goodnight & Goodnight, 1942 – Guyana
- Rhopalocranaus ypsilon Roewer, 1913 – Colombia

- Rhopalocranellus Roewer, 1925

- Rhopalocranellus festae Roewer, 1925 – Ecuador

- Sanvincentia Roewer, 1943

- Sanvincentia tarsalis Roewer, 1943 – Virgin Islands, St. Vincent

- Saramacia Roewer, 1913

- Saramacia alvarengai Kury, 1997 – Brazil
- Saramacia annulata (Mello-Leitão, 1931) – Brazil
- Saramacia aurilimbata Roewer, 1913 – Suriname
- Saramacia lucasae (R. d. L. S. Jim & H. E. M. Soares, 1991) – Brazil

- Semostrus Roewer, 1943

- Semostrus tarsalis Roewer, 1943 – Colombia

- Syncranaus Roewer, 1913

- Syncranaus cribrum Roewer, 1913 – Brazil

- Tegyra Sørensen, 1932

- Tegyra cinnamomea Sørensen, 1932 – Peru

- Zygopachylus Chamberlin, 1925

- Zygopachylus albomarginis Chamberlin, 1925 – Panama

- unknown genus

- unknown genus calcar (Roewer, 1943) – Venezuela
- unknown genus albituberculatus (Roewer, 1943) – Guyana
- unknown genus strinatii (V. Silhavy, 1979) – Venezuela
