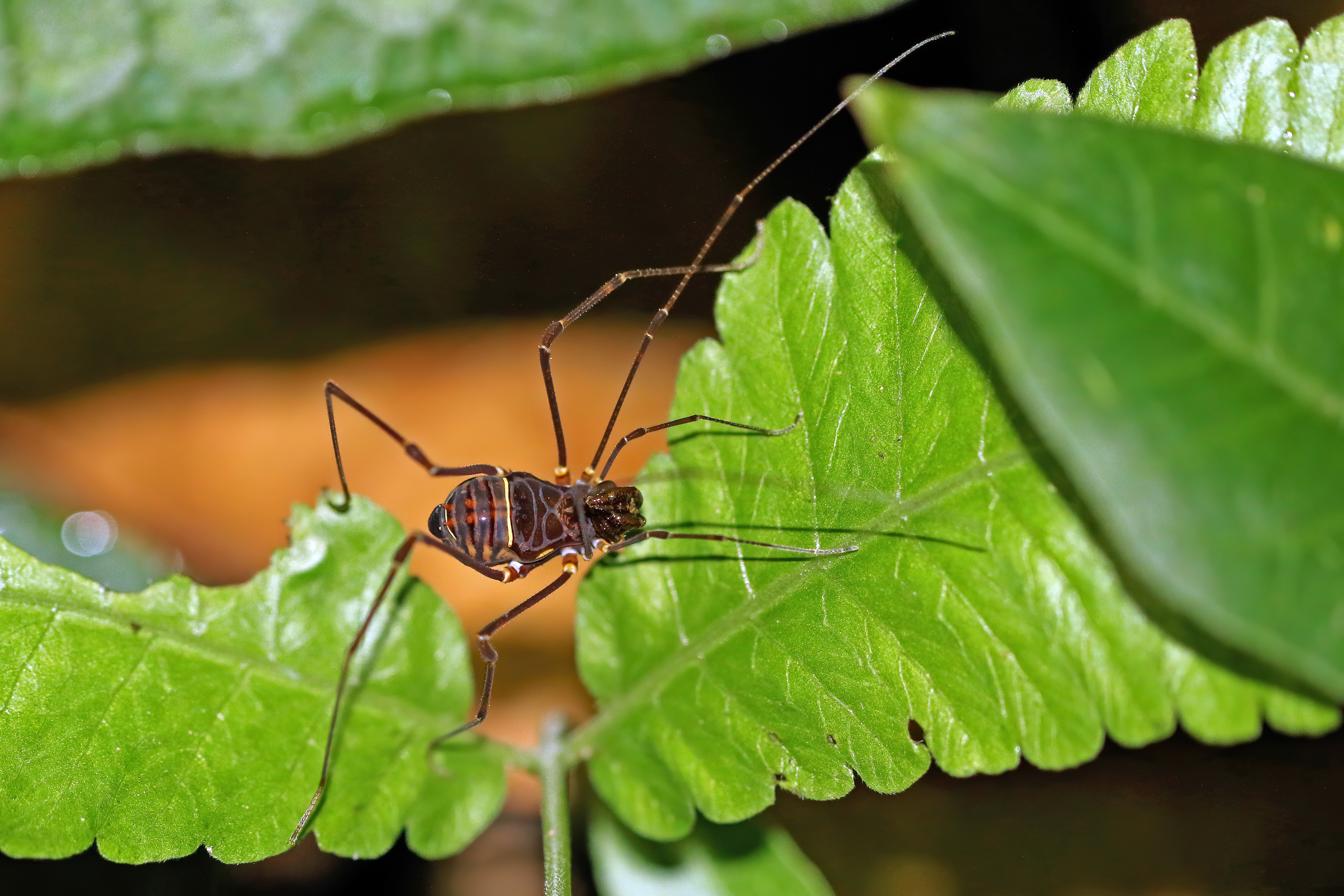
- Santinezia serratotibialis Trinidad

Scientific classification
- Domain: Eukaryota
- Kingdom: Animalia
- Phylum: Arthropoda
- Subphylum: Chelicerata
- Class: Arachnida
- Order: Opiliones
- Suborder: Laniatores
- Infraorder: Grassatores
- Superfamily: Gonyleptoidea
- Family: Cranaidae; Roewer, 1913

Subfamilies
- Cranainae; Heterocranainae; Prostygninae; Stygnicranainae

Diversity
- c. 80 genera, > 140 species

= Cranaidae =

Family of harvestmen/daddy longlegs

The Cranaidae are a family of neotropical harvestmen within the suborder Laniatores.

== Name ==
The name of the type genus is derived from Cranaus, the successor of Cecrops I as king of Attica in Greek mythology.

== Description ==
Body length ranges from about six to sixteen millimeters. The color normally ranges from brown to black greenish, with the legs sometimes lighter to yellowish. Some species feature white stripes on some regions.

== Distribution ==
Most species are found in northern South America, with few species found in Panama and Costa Rica. The diversity of the family is probably explained by the diversity of habitats in the cloud forests of Ecuador and Colombia, ranging from elevations of 500 to 3,500 m. Some species were even collected from elevations as high as 5,000 meters.

== Relationships ==
The four subfamilies constituting the Cranaidae were transferred from Gonyleptidae by Kury (1994), erecting it as a sister group to Cosmetidae and Gonyleptidae. Cranainae and Stygnocranainae are probably closely related.

== Subfamilies ==
See the List of Cranaidae species for a list of currently described species.

- Cranainae — French Guiana, Peru, Ecuador, Colombia, Panama, Brazil, Costa Rica, Trinidad and Venezuela (56 genera, 121 species)
- Heterocranainae — Ecuador, Colombia (1 genus, 2 species)
- Prostygninae — Peru, Ecuador, Venezuela, Colombia (16 genera, 18 species)
- Stygnicranainae — Ecuador, Colombia (3 genera, 6 species)
