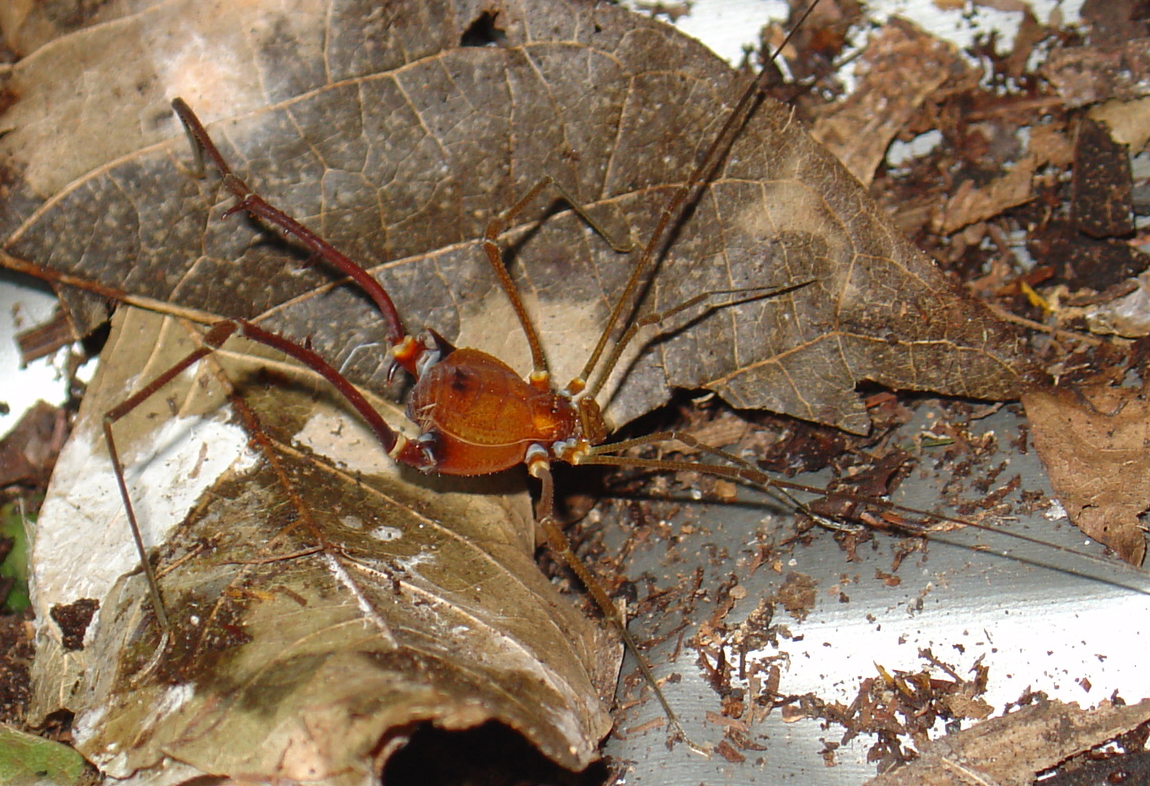
- Metagonyleptes calcar (Gonyleptidae)

Scientific classification
- Domain: Eukaryota
- Kingdom: Animalia
- Phylum: Arthropoda
- Subphylum: Chelicerata
- Class: Arachnida
- Order: Opiliones
- Suborder: Laniatores
- Infraorder: Grassatores
- Superfamily: Gonyleptoidea; Sundevall, 1833

= Gonyleptoidea =

Superfamily of harvestmen/daddy longlegs

Gonyleptoidea is the most diverse superfamily of the Grassatores. It includes around 2,500 species distributed in the Neotropics. They are characterized by the simplified male genitalia, with the glans free subapical in the truncus.

Gonyleptoidea is the only group of harvestmen to show maternal care of offspring.

== Families ==
- Agoristenidae Šilhavý, 1973
- Ampycidae Kury, 2003
- Askawachidae Kury & Carvalho, 2020
- Cosmetidae Koch, 1839
- Cranaidae Roewer, 1913
- Cryptogeobiiidae Kury, 2014
- Gerdesiidae Bragagnolo, Hara & Pinto-da-Rocha, 2015
- Gonyleptidae Sundevall, 1833
- Manaosbiidae Roewer, 1943
- Metasarcidae Kury, 1994
- Nomoclastidae Roewer, 1943
- Otilioleptidae Acosta, 2019
- Prostygnidae Roewer, 1913
- Stygnidae Simon, 1879
- Stygnopsidae Sørensen, 1932
