= Stygophalangium =

Scientific classification
- Kingdom: Animalia
- Phylum: Arthropoda
- Class: Arachnida
- Order: Opiliones (but see text)
- Family: Stygophalangiidae Oudemans, 1933
- Genus: Stygophalangium Oudemans, 1933
- Species: S. karamani

Binomial name
- Stygophalangium karamani Oudemans, 1933

Species of harvestman/daddy longlegs

Stygophalangium karamani is a species of arachnid. Although sometimes classified as a harvestman in the infraorder Eupnoi (Phalangioidea), its identity is uncertain, but it is probably a species of Acari (mites).

== Name ==
The genus name is a combination of Styx, the river of Greek mythology and the harvestman genus Phalangium. The species is named after zoologist Stanko Karaman, who collected the described specimen.
