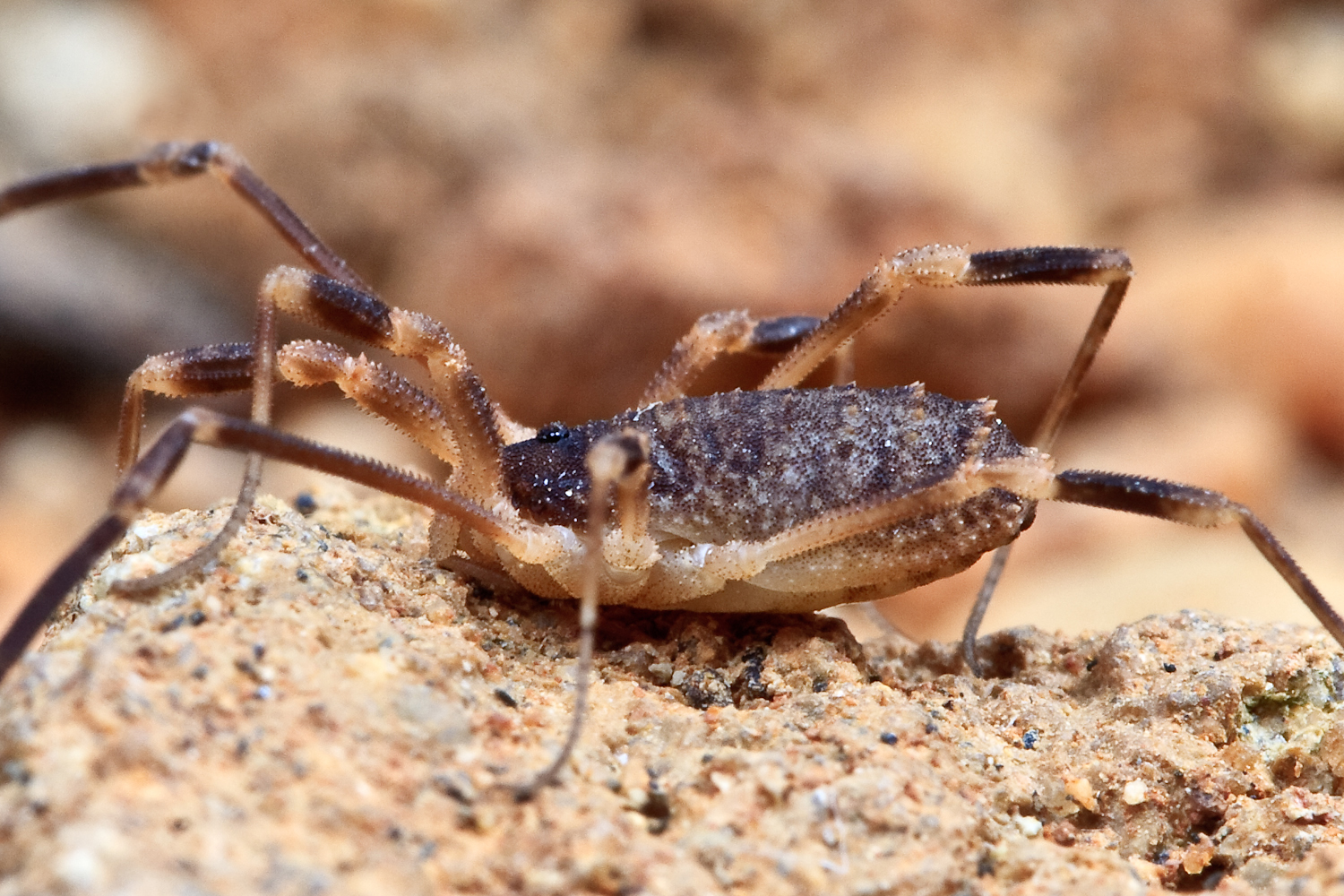
- Dalquestia rugosa (female)

Scientific classification
- Domain: Eukaryota
- Kingdom: Animalia
- Phylum: Arthropoda
- Subphylum: Chelicerata
- Class: Arachnida
- Order: Opiliones
- Suborder: Eupnoi
- Superfamily: Phalangioidea
- Family: Globipedidae
- Genus: Dalquestia; Cokendolpher, 1984

Type species
- Eurybunus formosus Banks, 1910

Species
- See text

Diversity
- 6 species

= Dalquestia =

Genus of harvestmen/daddy longlegs

Dalquestia is a genus of harvestmen in the family Globipedidae with six described species (as of 2023). All species are found in North America.

== Description ==
The genus Dendrolasma was described by Cokendolpher, 1984, with the type species Eurybunus formosus Banks, 1910.

== Species ==
These species belong to the genus Dalquestia:

- Dalquestia concho Cokendolpher, 1984 – Mexico (Chihuahua, Durango)^{c g}
- Dalquestia formosa (Banks, 1910) – USA (Texas); Mexico (Nuevo León)^{i c g b}
- Dalquestia grasshoffi Cokendolpher, 1984 – Mexico (Chihuahua, Hidalgo)^{c g}
- Dalquestia leucopyga Cokendolpher & Sissom, 2000 – Mexico (Tamaulipas)^{c g}
- Dalquestia rothorum Cokendolpher & Stockwell, 1986 – USA (Arizona)^{b c g}
- Dalquestia rugosa (Schenkel, 1951) – USA (California)^{i c g b}

Data sources: i = ITIS, c = Catalogue of Life, g = GBIF, b = Bugguide.net

== Etymology ==
The genus is neuter.
