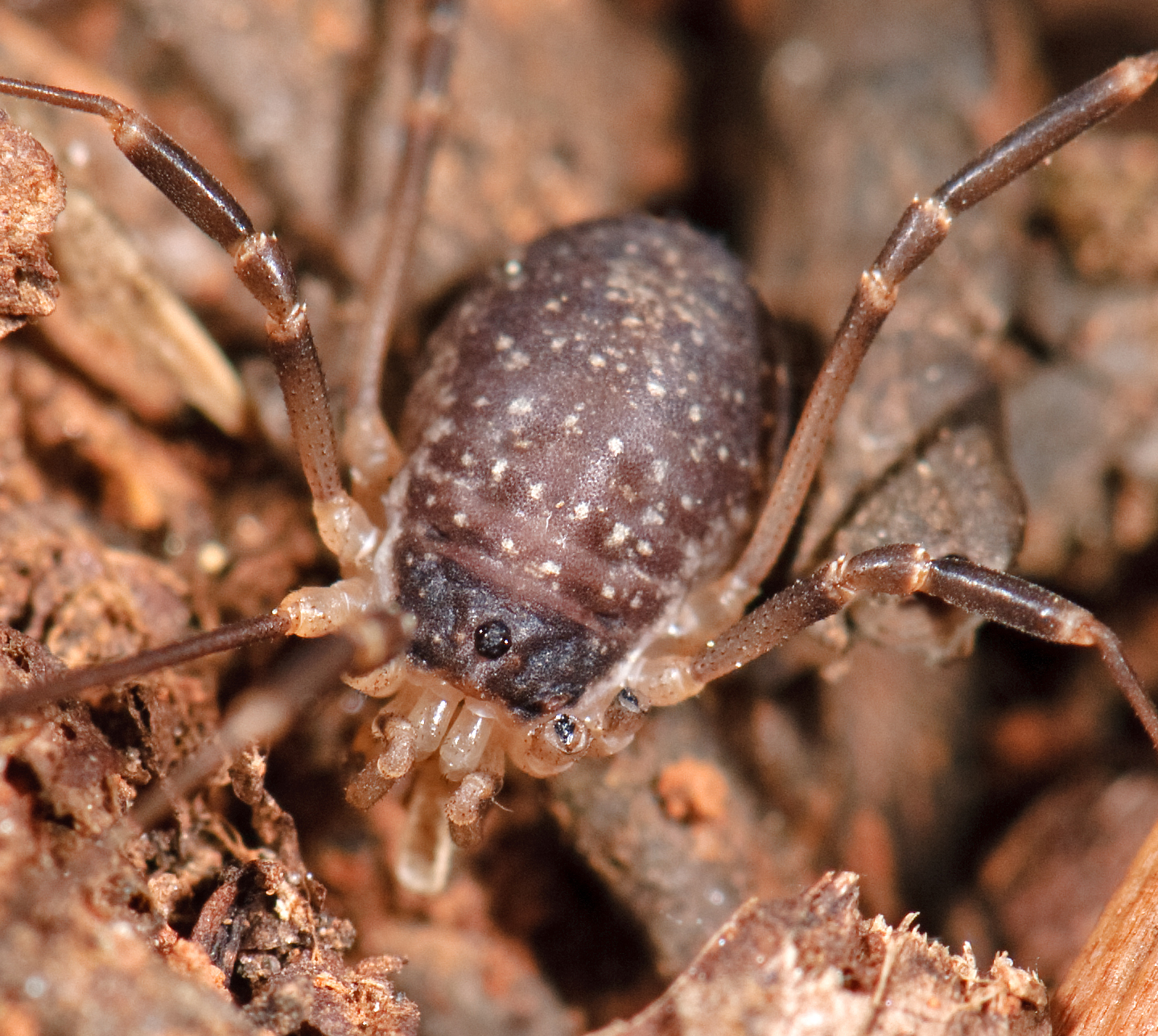
- Dendrolasma mirabile

Scientific classification
- Domain: Eukaryota
- Kingdom: Animalia
- Phylum: Arthropoda
- Subphylum: Chelicerata
- Class: Arachnida
- Order: Opiliones
- Suborder: Eupnoi
- Superfamily: Phalangioidea
- Family: Globipedidae
- Genus: Globipes; Banks, 1893

Type species
- Globipes spinulatus Banks, 1893

Diversity
- 3 species

= Globipes =

Genus of harvestmen/daddy longlegs

Globipes is a genus of harvestmen in the family Globipedidae from North America with three described species (as of 2023). Two are found on the western coast of the USA.

== Description ==
The genus Globipes was described by Nathan Banks, with the type species Globipes spinulatus Banks, 1893.

== Etymology ==
The genus is masculine.

== Species ==
These species belong to the genus Globipes:

- Globipes schultzei Roewer, 1932 – Mexico (Guerrero)
- Globipes simplex (Schenkel, 1951) – USA (California)
- Globipes spinulatus Banks, 1893 – USA (California)
