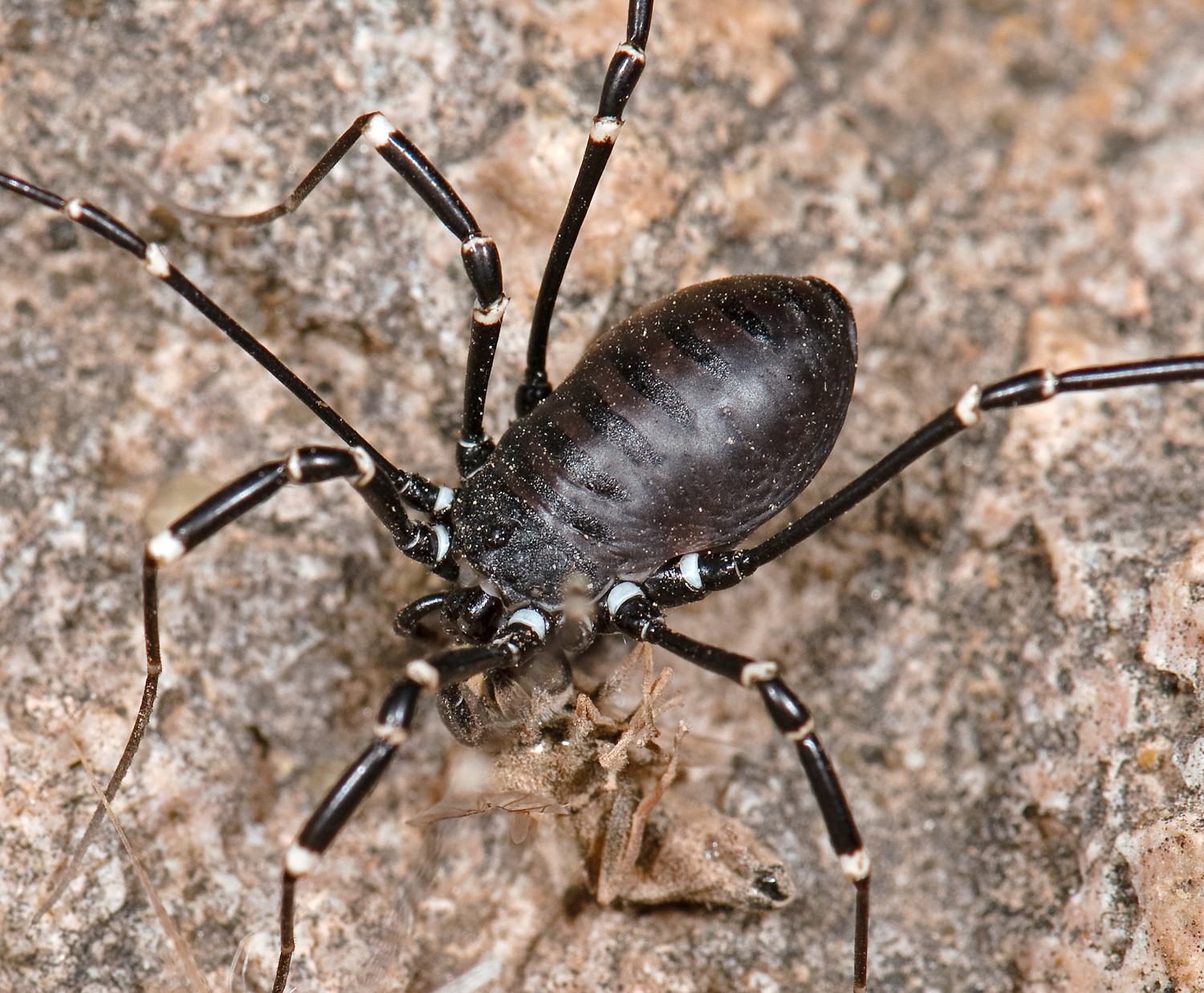

Scientific classification
- Domain: Eukaryota
- Kingdom: Animalia
- Phylum: Arthropoda
- Subphylum: Chelicerata
- Class: Arachnida
- Order: Opiliones
- Suborder: Eupnoi
- Superfamily: Phalangioidea
- Family: Globipedidae
- Genus: Metopilio; Roewer, 1911

Type species
- Metopilio armiger (F.O. Pickard-Cambridge, 1905)

Species
- See text

= Metopilio =

Genus of harvestmen/daddy longlegs

Metopilio is a genus of harvestmen in the family Globipedidae from Mexico and Central America.

== Species ==
- Metopilio acanthipes (F.O.Pickard-Cambridge, 1905)
- Metopilio albispinulatus C.J.Goodnight & M.L.Goodnight, 1944
- Metopilio armatus C.J.Goodnight & M.L.Goodnight, 1953
- Metopilio armigerus (F.O.Pickard-Cambridge, 1905)
- Metopilio australis (Banks, 1909)
- Metopilio cyaneus Roewer, 1956b
- Metopilio diazi C.J.Goodnight & M.L.Goodnight, 1945
- Metopilio foveolatus Roewer, 1956
- Metopilio gertschi (Roewer, 1956)
- Metopilio hispidus Roewer, 1915
- Metopilio horridus (F.O.Pickard-Cambridge, 1905) (= Metopilio cambridgei Mello-Leitão, 1944; but an unnecessary replacement name)
- Metopilio maculatipes (F.O.Pickard-Cambridge, 1905)
- Metopilio mexicanus (Roewer, 1956)
- Metopilio multispinulatus C.J.Goodnight & M.L.Goodnight, 1944
- Metopilio niger C.J.Goodnight & M.L.Goodnight, 1942
- Metopilio ornatipes (Banks, 1909)
- Metopilio spinigerus F.O.Pickard-Cambridge, 1905
- Metopilio spinulatus (Banks, 1898)

[For Metopilio cambridgei Mello-Leitão, 1944, see Metopilio horridus (F.O.Pickard-Cambridge, 1905)]
