= Dalquestia formosa =

Scientific classification
- Domain: Eukaryota
- Kingdom: Animalia
- Phylum: Arthropoda
- Subphylum: Chelicerata
- Class: Arachnida
- Order: Opiliones
- Family: Globipedidae
- Genus: Dalquestia
- Species: D. formosa

Binomial name
- Dalquestia formosa (Banks, 1910)

Synonyms
- Eurybunus formosus Banks, 1910

Species of harvestman/daddy longlegs

Dalquestia formosa is a species of harvestman in the family Globipedidae. It is found in North America.
