= Protolophus tuberculatus =

Scientific classification
- Domain: Eukaryota
- Kingdom: Animalia
- Phylum: Arthropoda
- Subphylum: Chelicerata
- Class: Arachnida
- Order: Opiliones
- Family: Protolophidae
- Genus: Protolophus
- Species: P. tuberculatus

Binomial name
- Protolophus tuberculatus Banks, 1893

Species of harvestman/daddy longlegs

Protolophus tuberculatus is a species of harvestman in the family Protolophidae. It is found in the Western US.
