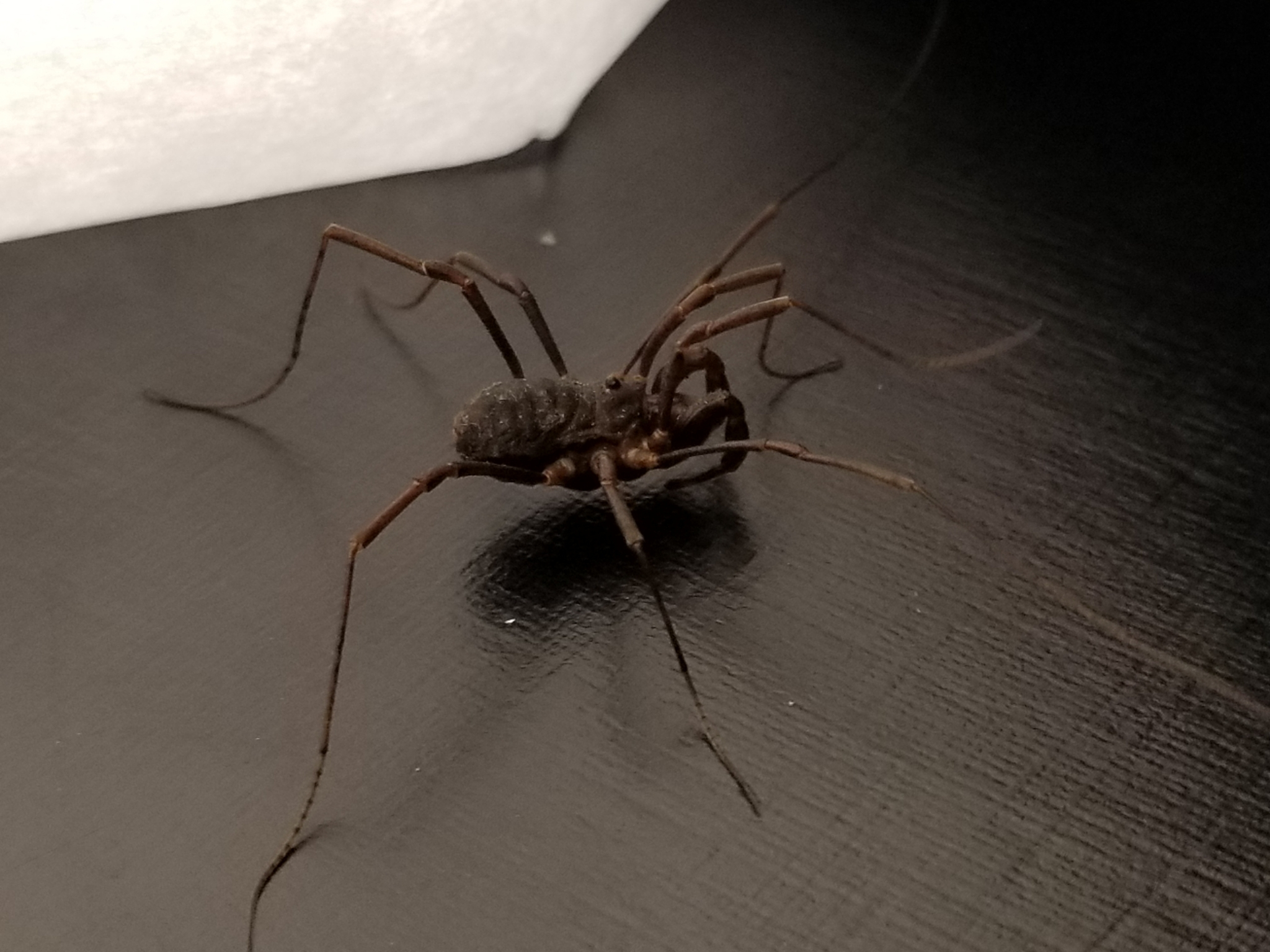

Scientific classification
- Domain: Eukaryota
- Kingdom: Animalia
- Phylum: Arthropoda
- Subphylum: Chelicerata
- Class: Arachnida
- Order: Opiliones
- Family: Protolophidae
- Genus: Protolophus
- Species: P. niger

Binomial name
- Protolophus niger C.J. Goodnight & M.L. Goodnight, 1942

= Protolophus niger =

Species of harvestman/daddy longlegs

Protolophus niger is a species of harvestman in the family Protolophidae. It is found in the western US.
