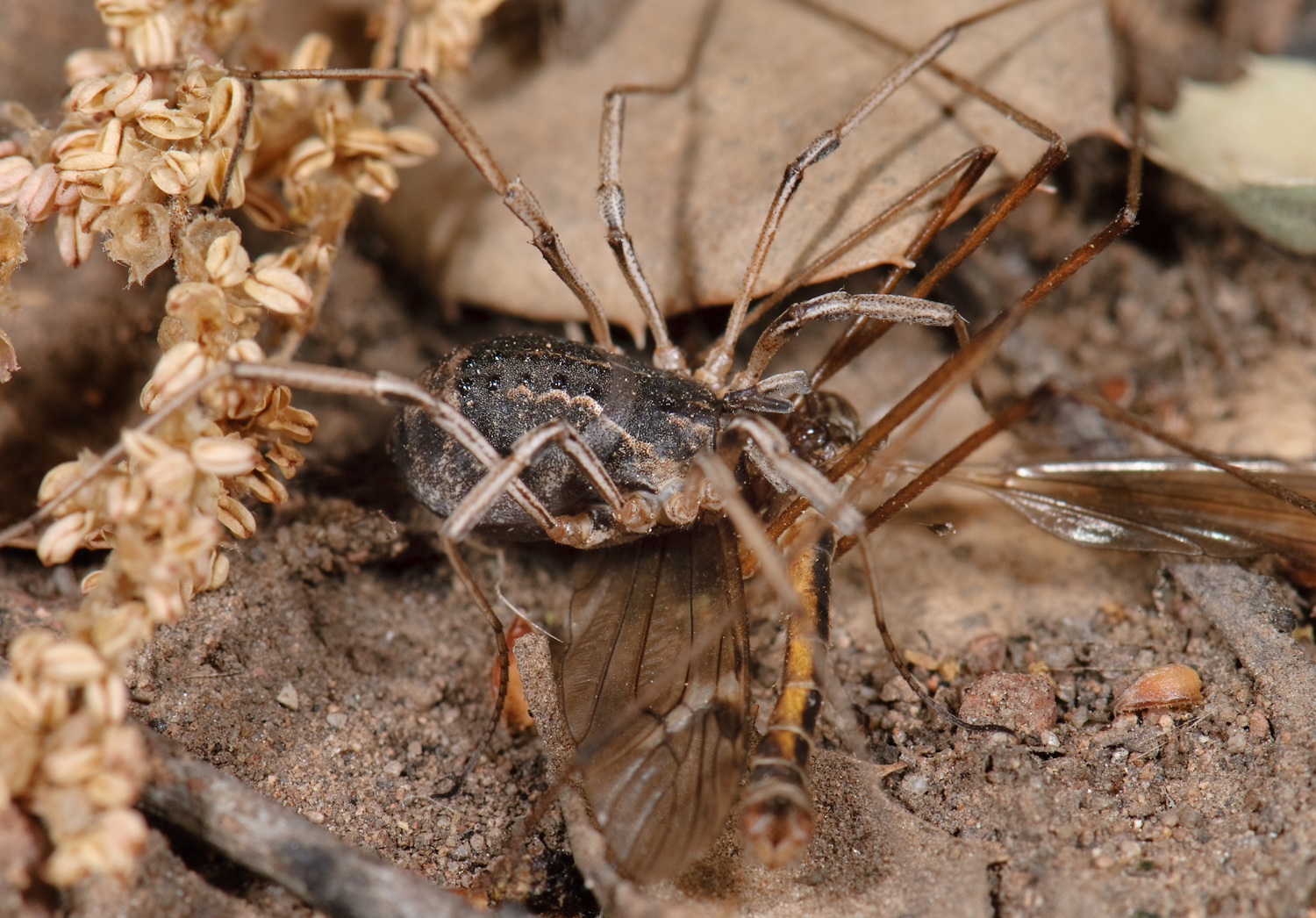

Scientific classification
- Domain: Eukaryota
- Kingdom: Animalia
- Phylum: Arthropoda
- Subphylum: Chelicerata
- Class: Arachnida
- Order: Opiliones
- Family: Protolophidae
- Genus: Protolophus
- Species: P. singularis

Binomial name
- Protolophus singularis Banks, 1893

= Protolophus singularis =

Species of harvestman/daddy longlegs

Protolophus singularis is a species of harvestman in the family Protolophidae. It is found in the Western US.
