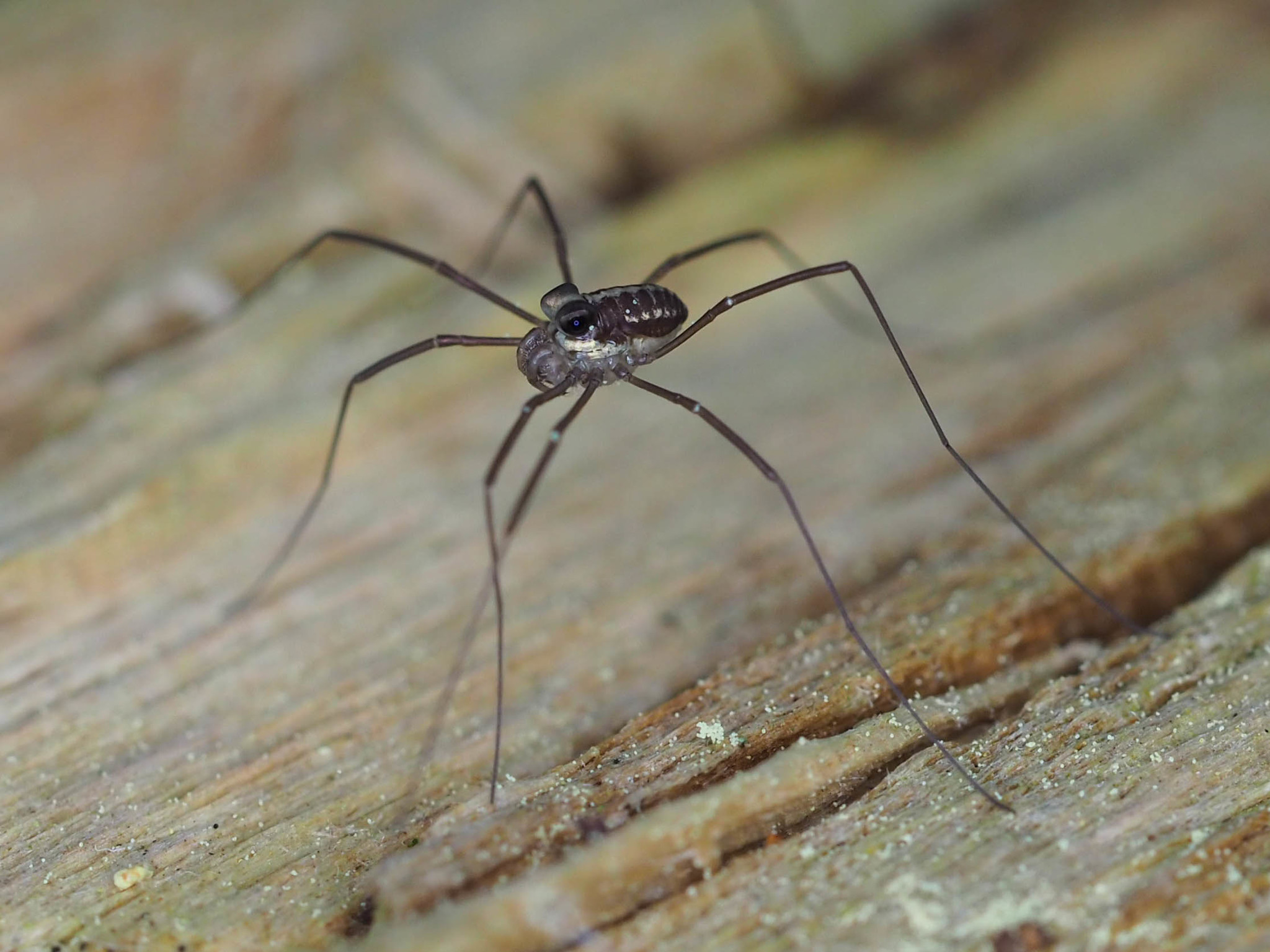
- Caddo agilis

Scientific classification
- Kingdom: Animalia
- Phylum: Arthropoda
- Subphylum: Chelicerata
- Class: Arachnida
- Order: Opiliones
- Suborder: Eupnoi
- Superfamily: Caddoidea; Banks, 1893
- Family: Caddidae; Banks, 1893

Genera
- See text

= Caddidae =

Caddidae Temporal range: Palaeogene–present

Family of harvestmen/daddy longlegs

Caddoidea superfamily of harvestmen arachnids with a single family Caddidae, which now only contains 2 extant species. The family previously contained many more taxa under a previous wider concept, but the familial definition was narrowed after restudy.

They are part of the suborder Eupnoi. They have mostly a body length between one and three millimeters.

== Distribution ==
Caddids are widely but discontinuously distributed. In the subfamily Caddinae, Caddo is found in eastern North America and Japan with the Kuril Islands. Other similar lineages have previously been grouped together ias a wider concept of Caddidae (After Shear, 1974). Notable some previously in a second subfamily Acropsopilioninae have since been restored to their own family Acropsopilionidae. These are now placed within the suborder Dyspnoi, as originally established by Roewer, 1923. The lineage includes Acropsopilio from scattered localities in the Americas, Australia and New Zealand. Also they include Austropsopilio from Chile, eastern Australia & Tasmania and with those from the latter locality being treated by some as Tasmanopilio. Also it now includes Caddella, which is endemic to southern South Africa.
Another genus Hesperopilio, with species from Australia and Chile, has also historically been included in a wider concept of Caddidae, remains in the Suborder Dyspnoi, but has since been transferred to Phalangioidea, although not clearly placed in any established family.

Under the previous wider concept of Caddidae, the complex pattern of biogeography suggested that separation occurred in several steps: during the Neogene (eastern North America and Japan); at the beginning or before the Tertiary (South America and Australia), and during the time of Gondwana (Africa and Australia). However, the diversification of lineages requires future re-interpretation for the updated taxonomic framework.

== Name ==
The family name is derived from "Caddo", a North American indigenous culture, people and language.

== Species ==
- Caddinae Banks, 1892
  - Caddo Banks, 1892 (eastern North America, Japan)

  - Caddo agilis Banks, 1892 – USA, Canada, Japan, Russia (Kuril Islands)
  - Caddo pepperella Shear, 1974 – USA, Japan, South Korea (?)
  - † Caddo dentipalpis (Koch & Berendt) (fossil: Baltic Amber)
