= Protolophus hoffeinsi =

Protolophus hoffeinsi Temporal range: Eocene

Scientific classification
- Kingdom: Animalia
- Phylum: Arthropoda
- Subphylum: Chelicerata
- Class: Arachnida
- Order: Opiliones
- Family: Protolophidae
- Genus: Protolophus
- Species: †P. hoffeinsi

Binomial name
- †Protolophus hoffeinsi Elsaka et al., 2019

Extinct species of arachnid

Protolophus hoffeinsi is an extinct species of Protolophus that inhabited Europe during the Eocene epoch.
