= Prashant Sharma =

Prashant Sharma may refer to:

- Prashant Sharma (politician) (born 1964), an Indian politician from Rajasthan
- Prashant P. Sharma (born 1984), an Indian-American biologist
