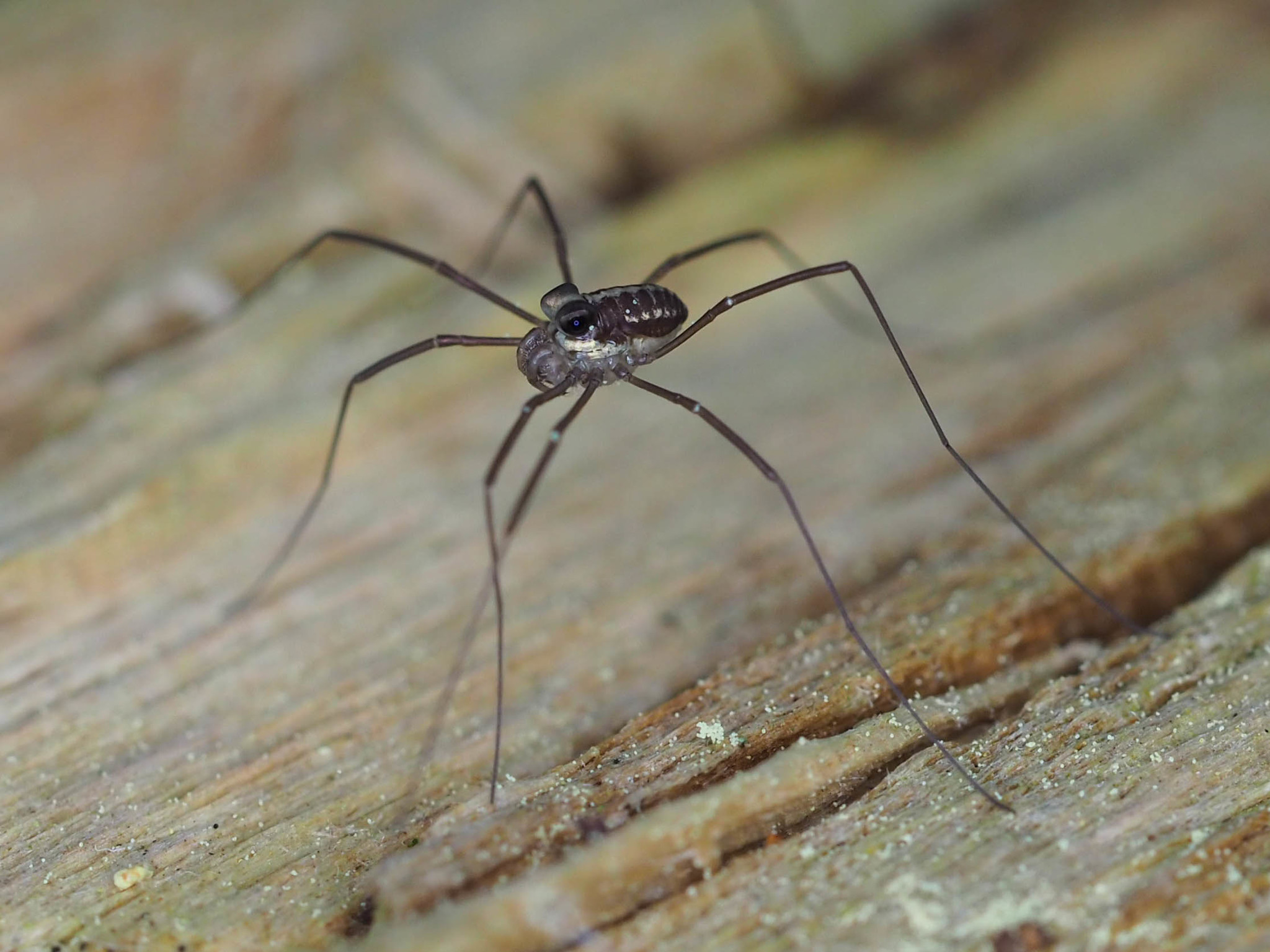

Scientific classification
- Kingdom: Animalia
- Phylum: Arthropoda
- Subphylum: Chelicerata
- Class: Arachnida
- Order: Opiliones
- Family: Caddidae
- Genus: Caddo
- Species: C. agilis

Binomial name
- Caddo agilis Banks, 1892

= Caddo agilis =

Species of harvestman/daddy longlegs

Caddo agilis is a species of harvestman in the family Caddidae. It is found in North America and Japan.
