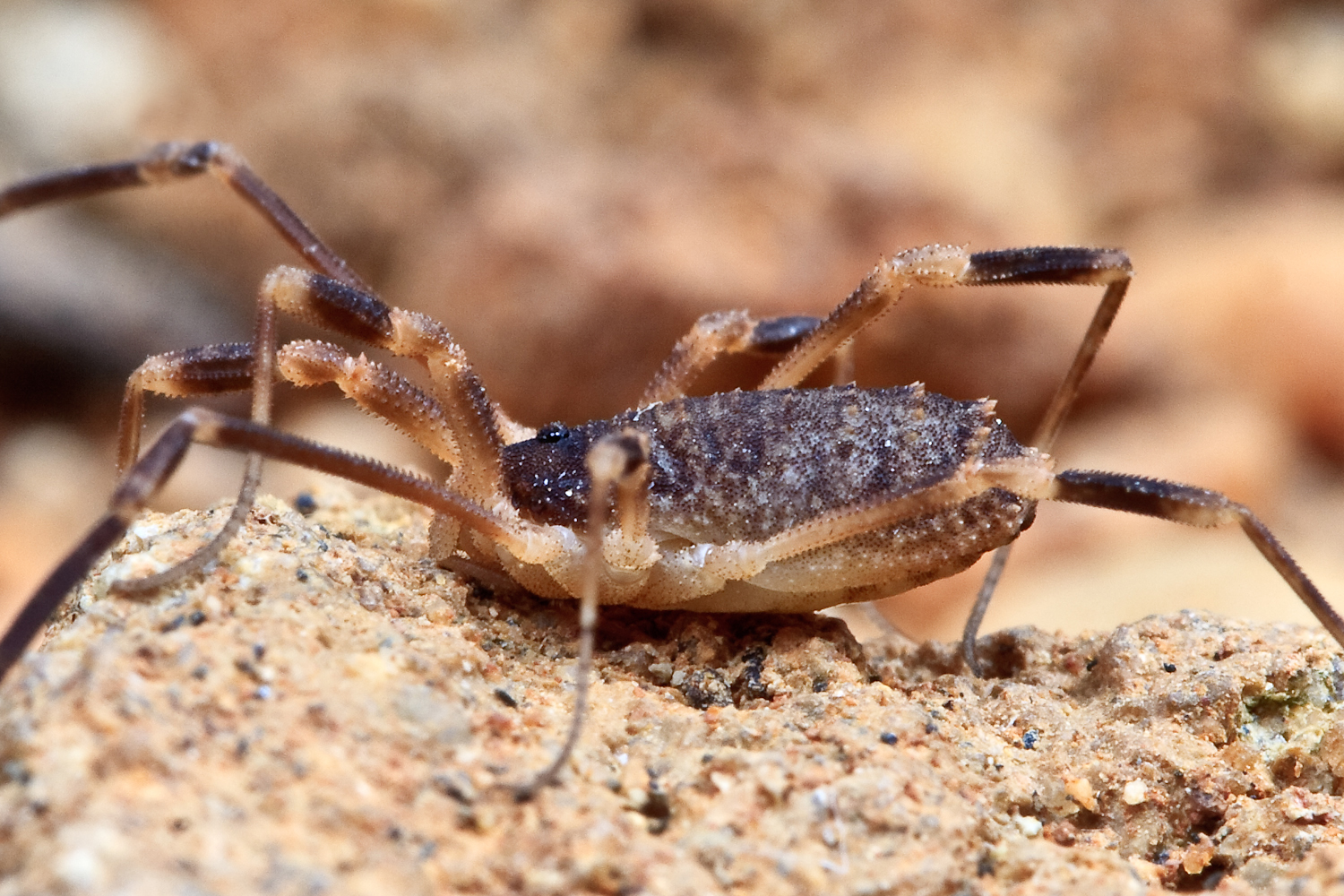

Scientific classification
- Domain: Eukaryota
- Kingdom: Animalia
- Phylum: Arthropoda
- Subphylum: Chelicerata
- Class: Arachnida
- Order: Opiliones
- Family: Globipedidae
- Genus: Dalquestia
- Species: D. rugosa

Binomial name
- Dalquestia rugosa (Schenkel, 1951)

Synonyms
- Globipes rugosa Schenkel, 1951

= Dalquestia rugosa =

Species of harvestman/daddy longlegs

Dalquestia rugosa is a species of harvestman in the family Globipedidae. It is found in North America.
