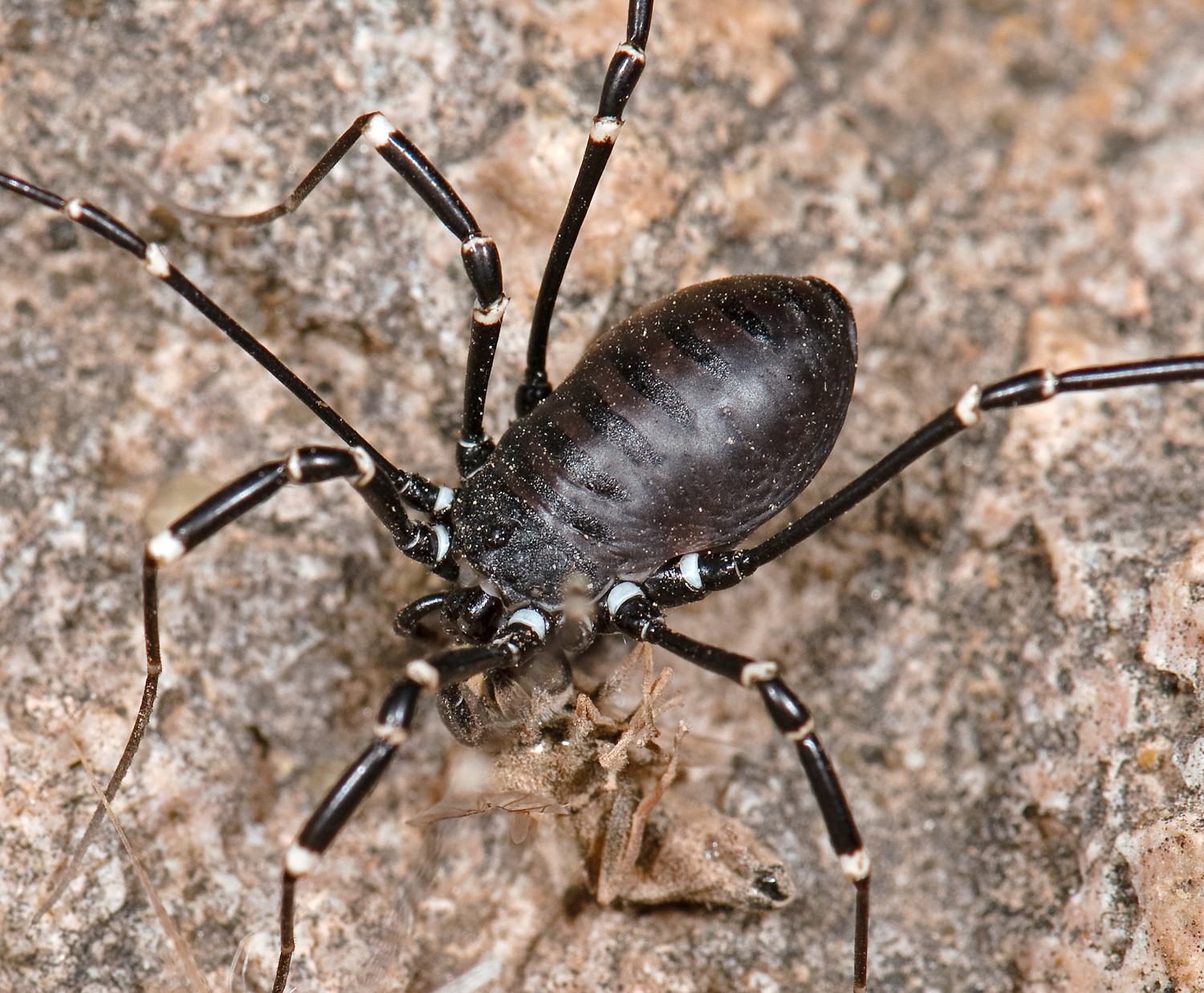

Scientific classification
- Domain: Eukaryota
- Kingdom: Animalia
- Phylum: Arthropoda
- Subphylum: Chelicerata
- Class: Arachnida
- Order: Opiliones
- Family: Globipedidae
- Genus: Eurybunus; Banks, 1893

Species
- See text

= Eurybunus =

Genus of harvestmen/daddy longlegs

Eurybunus is a genus of harvestmen in the family Globipedidae from the Western United States.

== Species ==
- Eurybunus brunneus Banks, 1893
- Eurybunus pallidus C.J.Goodnight & M.L.Goodnight, 1943
- Eurybunus riversi C.J.Goodnight & M.L.Goodnight, 1943
- Eurybunus spinosus Banks, 1895
