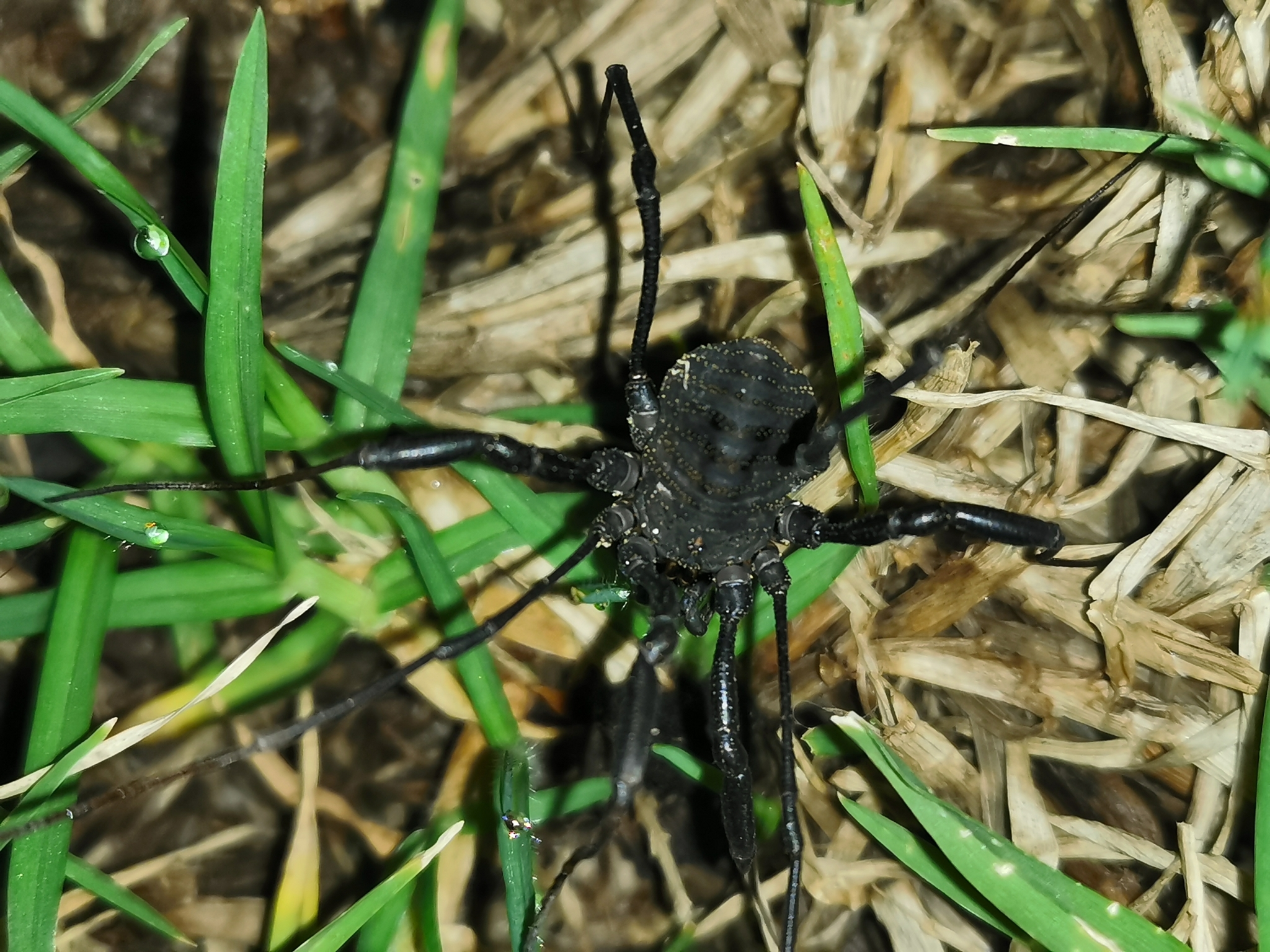

Scientific classification
- Kingdom: Animalia
- Phylum: Arthropoda
- Subphylum: Chelicerata
- Class: Arachnida
- Order: Opiliones
- Family: Globipedidae
- Genus: Diguetinus; Roewer, 1912
- Species: D. raptator

Binomial name
- Diguetinus raptator Roewer, 1912

= Diguetinus =

Genus of harvestmen/daddy longlegs

Diguetinus raptator is a species of harvestmen in a monotypic genus in the family Globipedidae from Jalisco, Mexico.
