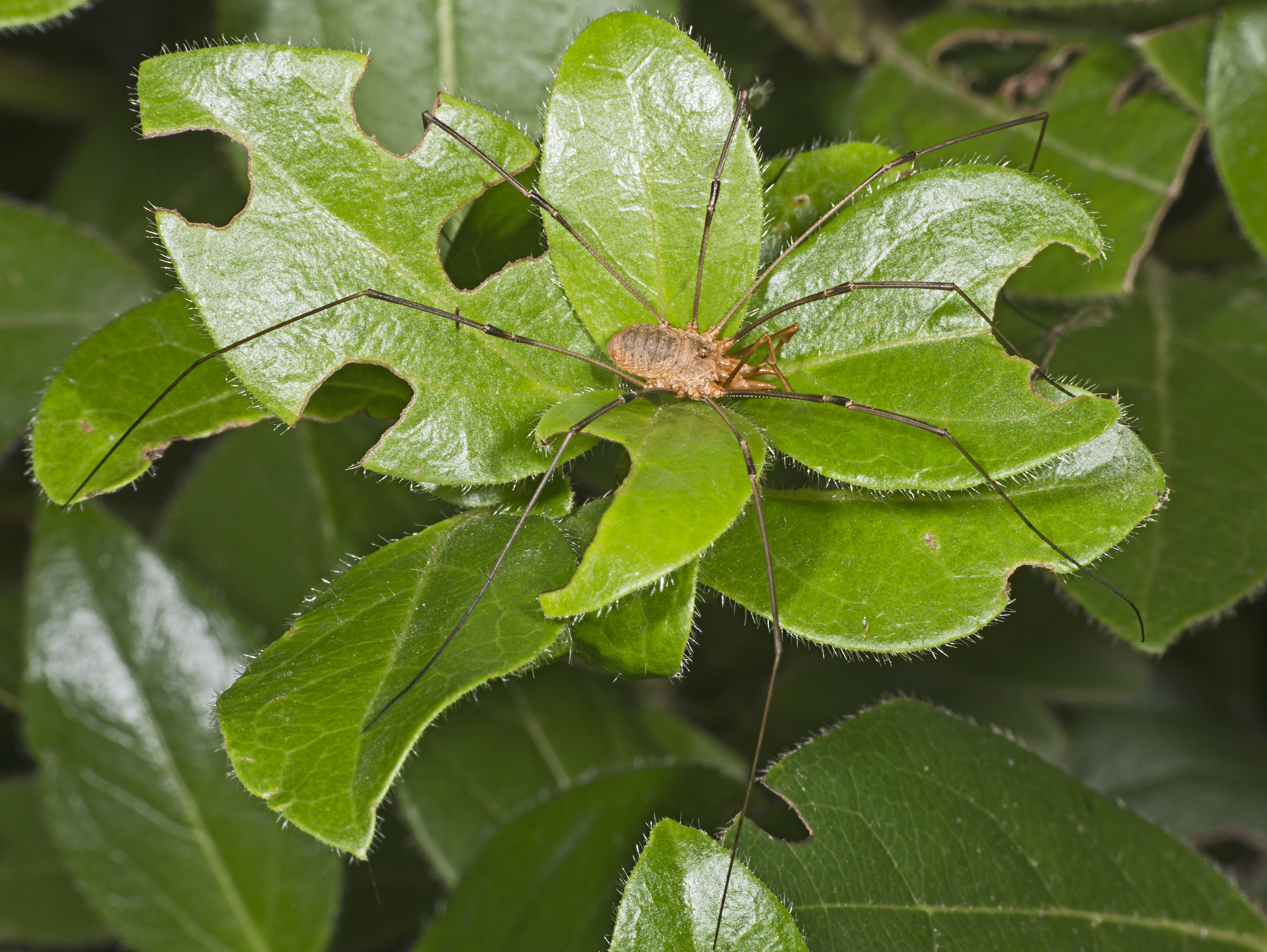
- Male
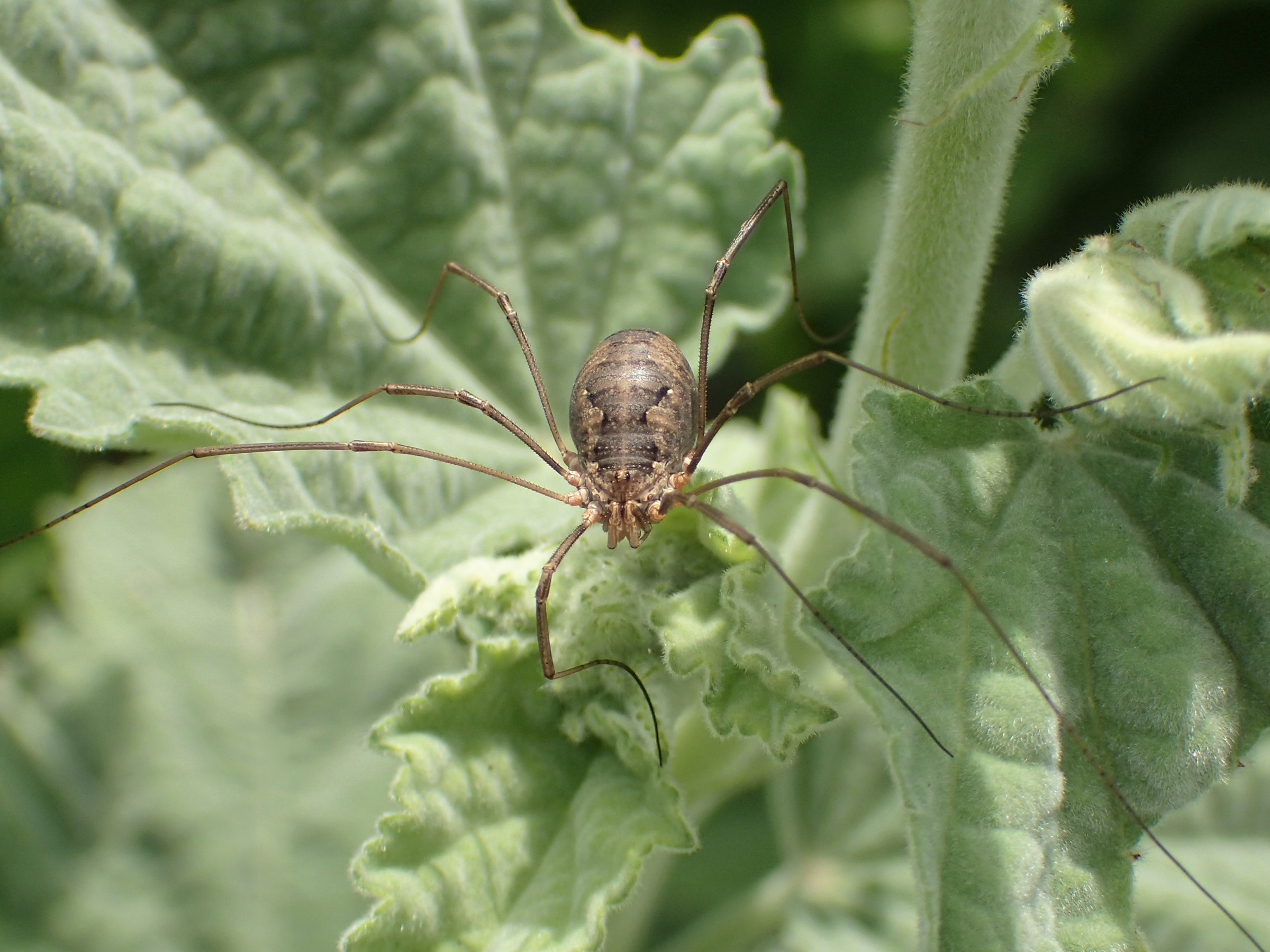
- Female

Scientific classification
- Kingdom: Animalia
- Phylum: Arthropoda
- Subphylum: Chelicerata
- Class: Arachnida
- Order: Opiliones
- Family: Phalangiidae
- Genus: Phalangium
- Species: P. opilio

Binomial name
- Phalangium opilio Linnaeus, 1758

Synonyms
- List: Cerastoma aduncum Koch, 1870; Cerastoma brevicornis Koch, 1839; Cerastoma capricorne Koch, 1869; Cerastoma cornutum (Linnaeus, 1767); Cerastoma curvicornis Koch, 1839; Cerastoma dentatum Koch, 1871; Cerastoma tirolense Koch, 1869; Dentizacheus minor Rambla, 1966; Opilio angulatichelis Roewer, 1952; Opilio molluscus Koch, 1867; Opilio praefectus Koch, 1867; Phalangium brevicorne Simon, 1879; Phalangium cornutum Degeer, 1778; Phalangium cornutum Linnaeus, 1767; Phalangium longicorne Simon, 1882; Phalangium longipalpis Weed, 1890; Platybunus nigrovittatus subsp. hungaricus Szalay, 1949

= Phalangium opilio =

Species of harvestman/daddy longlegs

Phalangium opilio (also known as the common harvestman, brown harvestman and daddy longlegs) is a species of harvestman belonging to the family Phalangiidae.

== Taxonomy ==
P. opilio is a member of the Eupnoi suborder of Opiliones.

== Distribution ==
P. opilio has a mostly Holarctic distribution and is the most widespread harvestman species worldwide, occurring natively in Europe, North and Central Asia, and Asia Minor. The species has been introduced to North America, North Africa and New Zealand from Europe. In North America, it occurs in non-desert regions of southern Canada and the United States.

=== Habitat ===
This species can be found in a wide range of open habitats, including meadows, bogs, and forests. It is also most abundant in anthropogenic habitats, and is thus considered a synanthropic species of harvestmen. In can be found in habitats modified by humans, such as gardens, agroecosystems, hedgerows, lawns, quarries, urban green spaces, walls and bridges. In agricultural settings, P. opilio is common in temperate cropland, living among crops such as corn, alfalfa, small grains, potatoes, cabbage, strawberries, and apple.

P. opilio apparently prefer vertical surfaces, including tree trunks and vertical man-made structures like fences and walls, with a preference for wood substrate due to its low thermal conductivity and slow release of moisture, being a thermophilous and moderately hygrophilous species. However, their preference varies based on the amount of cover available in a certain area. P. opilio tend to be found in shrubs and brushy vegetation when sparse shrub cover exists, but tend to be found on the ground layer when dense cover is present, such as low vegetation and grass. Early instars (immature P. opilio) mostly occur on the ground, but later instars have a broader vertical range. P. opilio have also been observed to take cover in low vegetation, like grass, during rain.

== Description ==
Like other harvestmen, P. opilio have long, slender legs and a short, round body. Adult P. opilio have a body length of 3.5–9 mm (1/8–3/8 in). Males tend to have smaller bodies than females, but have noticeably larger pedipalps and chelicerae with prominent outgrowths (horns) on the dorsal side of the second segment. Both sexes are similarly coloured and are marked light brown and gray, often with a light cream underside.

P. opilio is relatively large compared to other harvestmen species. In individuals of both sexes, the legs, bodies, and eye tubercles are covered with spines. Males can be differentiated from females by their longer pedipalps and the existence of long, forward-pointing processes, appearing similar to horns, on the second segment of their chelicerae. In some European populations, P. opilio male chelicerae and pedipalpal size have significant allometric variation, but it's not clear whether this is continuous or discrete, which would indicate male dimorphism in P. opilio.

As an arachnid species, P. opilio have four pairs of legs. Three of these pairs are for movement, but the longest, second pair is antennae-shaped and primarily used as a sensory appendage to feel their surroundings. Their tarsus, the segment of their legs furthest from their body, have numerous pseudosegments called tarsomeres that make them prehensile, enabling P. opilio to use them in climbing, such as by curling them around twigs; courtship of mates; and male—male combat. Their legs have seven segments, whereas pedipalps have six.

=== Juveniles ===
Immature P. opilio resemble adults, but have shorter legs relative to their bodies and are smaller overall. The cheliceral horns of the males are not noticeable until the molt to the penultimate instar. In Wisconsin populations of P. opilio, seven juvenile stages have been observed. These consist of a non-feeding postembryo (or "larva") stage that emerges from the egg and molts into the first instar within hours of hatching, followed by six instars.

=== Eggs ===
P. opilio's eggs are smooth, spherical in shape, and about 0.55 mm in diameter, laid in clusters ranging from ten to several hundred. As they mature, their color changes from off-white to dark grey-brown. Clutches consist of about 250 eggs in total with embryos that develop at the same time. Each egg has a thin, opaque chorion membrane and a thick, transparent vitelline membrane.

=== Similar species ===
Mitopus morio has a very similar appearance, but P. opilio can be distinguished by the two pale "denticles" (small teeth-like structures) below the anterior margin of the carapace, as well as the long forward-pointing "horns" on the second segment of male P. opilio's chelicerae.

== Behavior ==
Most of their time is spent stationary, but P. opilio have also been observed walking and leg palpating—making tapping movements with their sensory legs—as well as drinking, feeding, and grooming. As is typical of opilionids, the species is nocturnal, observed to exhibit 90% of their total activity between 18:00 and 06:00. Adults of both sexes have been observed to walk more from nightfall to midnight than during the day, and males have been observed to walk for longer in the early morning, until 03:00, possibly to attempt to find females to mate with. P. opilio also exhibit leg palpating only at night, with adult females and nymphs exhibiting more leg palpating than males, possibly as a foraging strategy.

=== Diet ===
P. opilio is a generalist predator and scavenger that feeds on soft-bodied animals found in crops, such as aphids, caterpillars, leafhoppers, beetle larvae, and mites. Sometimes it may also scavenge on hard-bodied animals, such as various arthropods, including other harvestmen.

They are also known to feed on Helicoverpa zea eggs among soybean crops.

=== Life cycle ===
Eggs are laid in moist areas and hatch in three to five months. The juveniles undergo several molts and reach maturity in two to three months. Both the time taken for eggs to hatch and the time taken for juveniles to mature can vary based on temperature, embryos development being fastest between 20–30 °C (68–86 °F) and completely ceasing below 10 °C (50 °F). Phalangium opilio is a univoltine species in Europe, producing one generation per year that overwinters as eggs. Two or more generations may occur within a year in some areas of North America, in which case eggs, immatures, and adults may all overwinter. For example, in Central Europe, one generation matures per year in early summer and late autumn. On the other hand, in Kentucky, they apparently undergo three generations per year, overwintering in the egg stage. In US populations, diapause (overwintering) is not a requirement for hatching; Wisconsin populations of P. opilio have been maintained in captivity with a continuous life cycle, which underlies their use for the study of developmental biology and comparative genomics.

=== Reproduction ===
Like other harvestman species, male and female P. opilio copulate with multiple partners to achieve internal fertilization, and males produce aflagellate sperm. The mating season of P. opilio is three months long, as examined in the cold humid "Dfb" climate subcategory of the Köppen–Geiger map.

When introduced to each other in a laboratory setting, male and female individuals usually mate within few seconds of contact. Female specimens laid one clutch about every three days, producing colonies that overwintered and yielded new adult females that bred and laid eggs in winter. The adult lifespan is 40 to 60 days long. The specimens observed that yielded these findings were collected from the states Massachusetts and Wisconsin in the United States during their breeding season from early June to early September, and kept in a container at 26 °C (79 °F) with moist coconut fiber, food and water.

=== Microhabitat separation and migration ===
When observed in small, fenced-in areas of soybean fields, P. opilio nymphs of different sizes and adults of different sexes inhabited different vertical levels, moving between the ground and the bottom, middle, and top of plants at different times of the day. For most of the day, medium-sized (with a cephalothorax 1.0–1.5 mm (1/16–1/16 in) wide) and large-sized (with a cephalothorax wider than 1.5 mm (1/16 in) nymphs and adults live at bottom and middle elevation on their surrounding plants. At nightfall (21:00), medium-sized nymphs tend to remain on plants at night, whereas larger nymphs and adults of both sexes move to the ground. A theory for this behavior is that medium-sized nymphs stay in vegetation at night to avoid higher predation risk from nocturnal ground predators and other P. opilio. Adult males tend to remain on the ground by 03:00, spending more time there than females and large nymphs that return to the plants by then. At 03:00, a substantial portion of female adults migrated to the top portion of the plants. The same happened with the males at 06:00, three hours later.

== Biology ==
=== Embryonic development ===
In 2022, an embryogenesis staging system, with description of stages of embryonic development, was presented for P. opilio by Guilherme Gainett et al. This was the first modern embryonic staging developed for a species of the order Opiliones, and used as a reference the P. opilio embryo descriptions by Manfred Moritz and Dietrich Winkler, as well as the embryonic staging that they had based their descriptions on, developed by Christian Juberthie for the species Odiellus gallicus, another species of the Phalangiidae family.

=== Developmental genetics ===
P. opilio serves as a model system for the study of developmental biology of arachnids, and the sole model species for the order Opiliones. Foundational work on the developmental biology of this species was established by Manfred Moritz and Dietrich Winkler in the 20th century, and resurrected by Prashant Sharma. Modern genetic studies of P. opilio comprised surveys of Hox genes and leg axis patterning genes. The establishment of gene silencing (RNA interference) in this species made it possible to test the function of genes in establishing the harvestman body plan. Study of P. opilio revealed that the gene dachshund is essential for the transition from a three-segmented chelicera (e.g., found in harvestmen, horseshoe crabs, and sea spiders) to a two-segmented chelicera (e.g., found in solifuges, pseudoscorpions, and spiders). Further investigation of homeobox genes like homothorax, labial, Deformed, and Sex combs reduced revealed the Hox code logic that specifies each appendage identity in the head of arachnids.

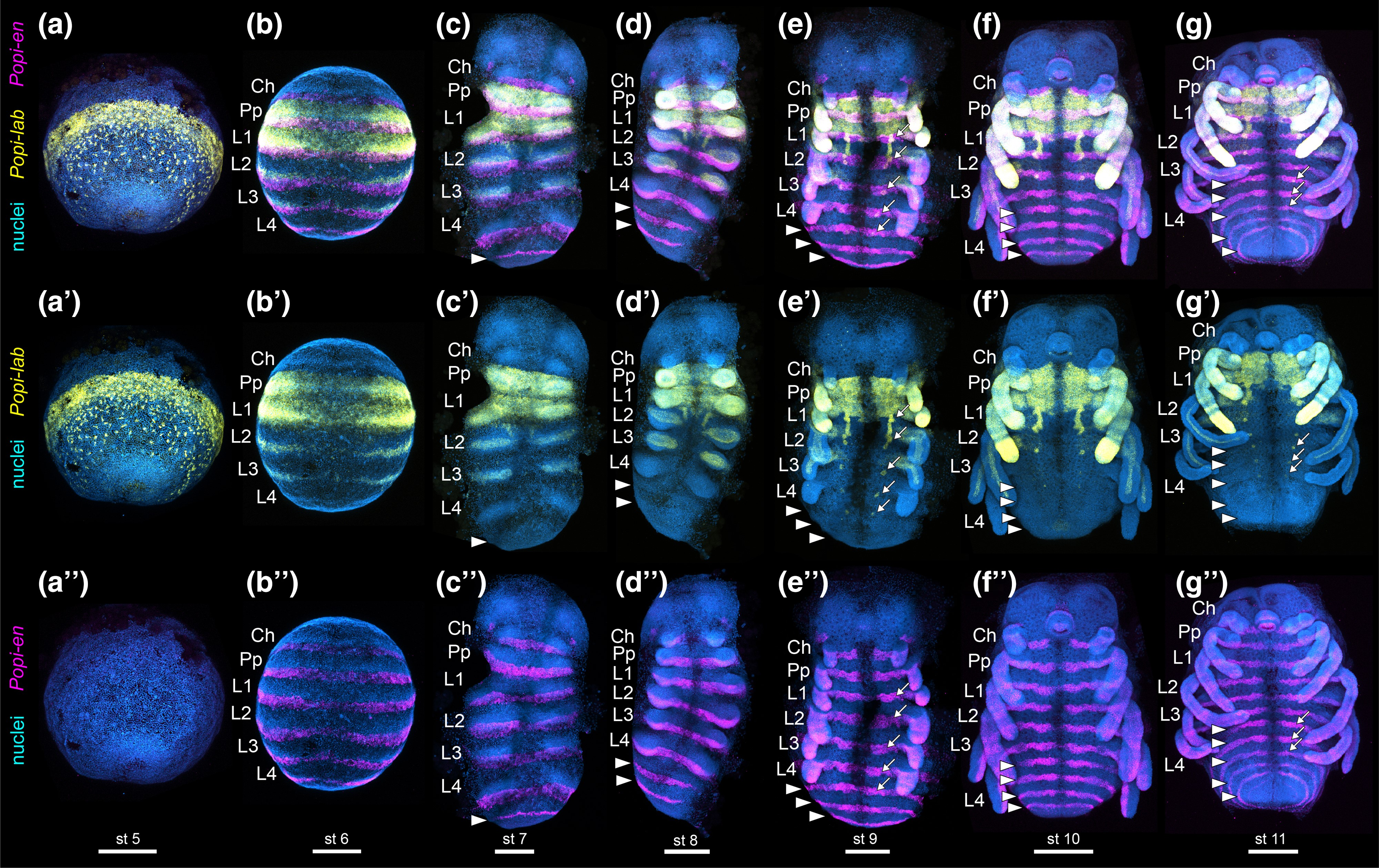
Gene expression during early embryonic development of P. opilio. By Gainett et al. (2023).

=== "Daddy short legs" ===
On August 4, 2021, a journal article was published by Guilherme Gainett et al. regarding their assembly of the first draft genome of P. opilio, created from a colony established from specimens collected in Madison, Wisconsin—the first draft genome ever assembled for a harvestman species. Guilherme Gainett et al. identified and examined the function of the genes Deformed (Dfd) and Sex combs reduced (Scr). These genes are also known as Hox genes, which control development in regions along an embryo's head-tail axis. Knockdown of the Dfd gene, preventing it from being expressed, led to the first two of P. opilio embryos' leg pairs transforming into pedipalps, a transformation known as homeosis, and their sensory leg pair becoming significantly shorter. Knockdown of both Dfd and Scr led to this homeotic transformation occurring in the first three pairs of legs. Knockdown of another gene, Epidermal growth factor receptor (Egfr) also caused shortened legs and the loss of tarsomeres. The resulting specimens with shortened legs have also been referred to as "daddy shortlegs", derived from the colloquial species name "daddy longlegs".

=== Discovery of vestigial eyes ===
It has long been thought that daddy-longlegs have a single pair of eyes on top of the head. Recent work on the development of P. opilio has revealed that this species in fact has six eyes. Two pairs of their eyes are vestigial and correspond to a second pair of median eyes (found today only in sea spiders and embryos of horseshoe crabs) and a pair of reduced lateral eyes (homologous to the lateral eyes of groups like spiders and scorpions). The arrangement of the Opiliones brain is now understood to be more primitive than previously understood, suggesting that arachnid groups like spiders and scorpions have counterintuitively advanced or "derived" neuroanatomy.

=== Contribution to arachnid phylogeny ===
Genomic resources established for P. opilio have shown that Opiliones are in fact not closely related to scorpions, as had long been suggested based on morphology; scorpions are understood to be more closely related to spiders (as part of the clade Arachnopulmonata) on the basis of a shared whole genome duplication that excludes groups like Opiliones, mites, and ticks.

== Relationship to humans ==
=== Research ===
Due to its broad, synanthropic distribution, P. opilio is considered an opportune representative of the order Opiliones. As such, it is actively used to study its embryonic development to examine arachnid development and evolution.

=== Biological pest control in agriculture ===
P. opilio feeds on many insect species considered pests, such that it can provide biological pest control in agricultural settings. It is not solely able to suppress any populations of a pest species, but its existence alongside other generalist predators contributes overall to controlling pest populations. Their value to human agriculture varies due to their generalist feeding habits and consumption of other members of its species, but this may in turn allow their populations to persist even when pest density is low, enabling them to suppress earlier stages of pest outbreaks when they do occur.

For example, since P. opilio preys on the eggs of Helicoverpa zea, a major agricultural pest, it can act as biological pest control for soybean crops. They particularly benefit the seasonal timing of soybean production in Kentucky because their second annual generation occurs in time for them to feed on H. zea eggs.

P. opilio is highly susceptible to some broad spectrum insecticides, so use of such insecticides is discouraged for conservation of P. opilio populations. Some specific products appear to cause less harm to P. opilio, such as Bt toxins.

== Gallery ==
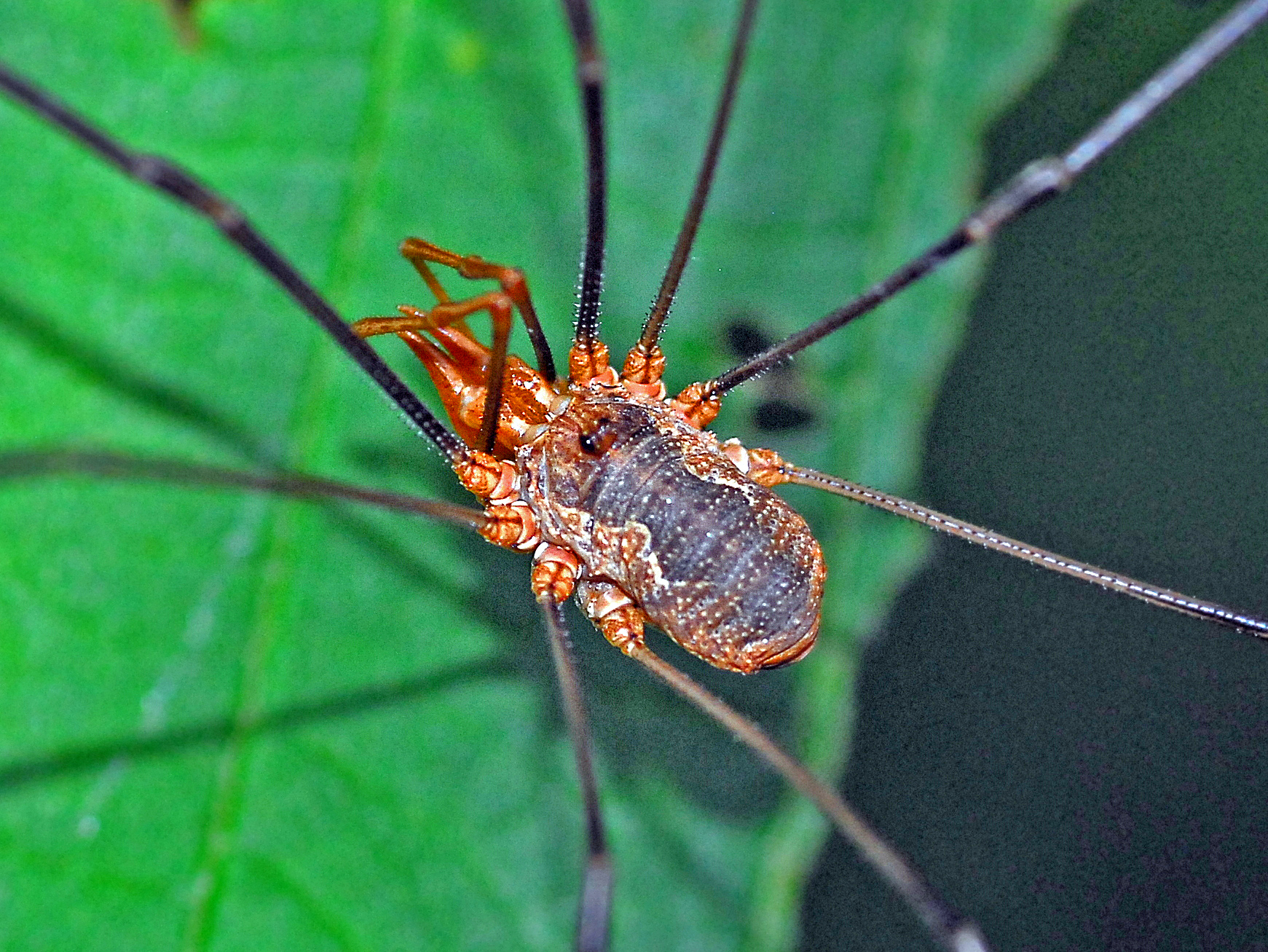
Male showing the "horns" on the chelicerae

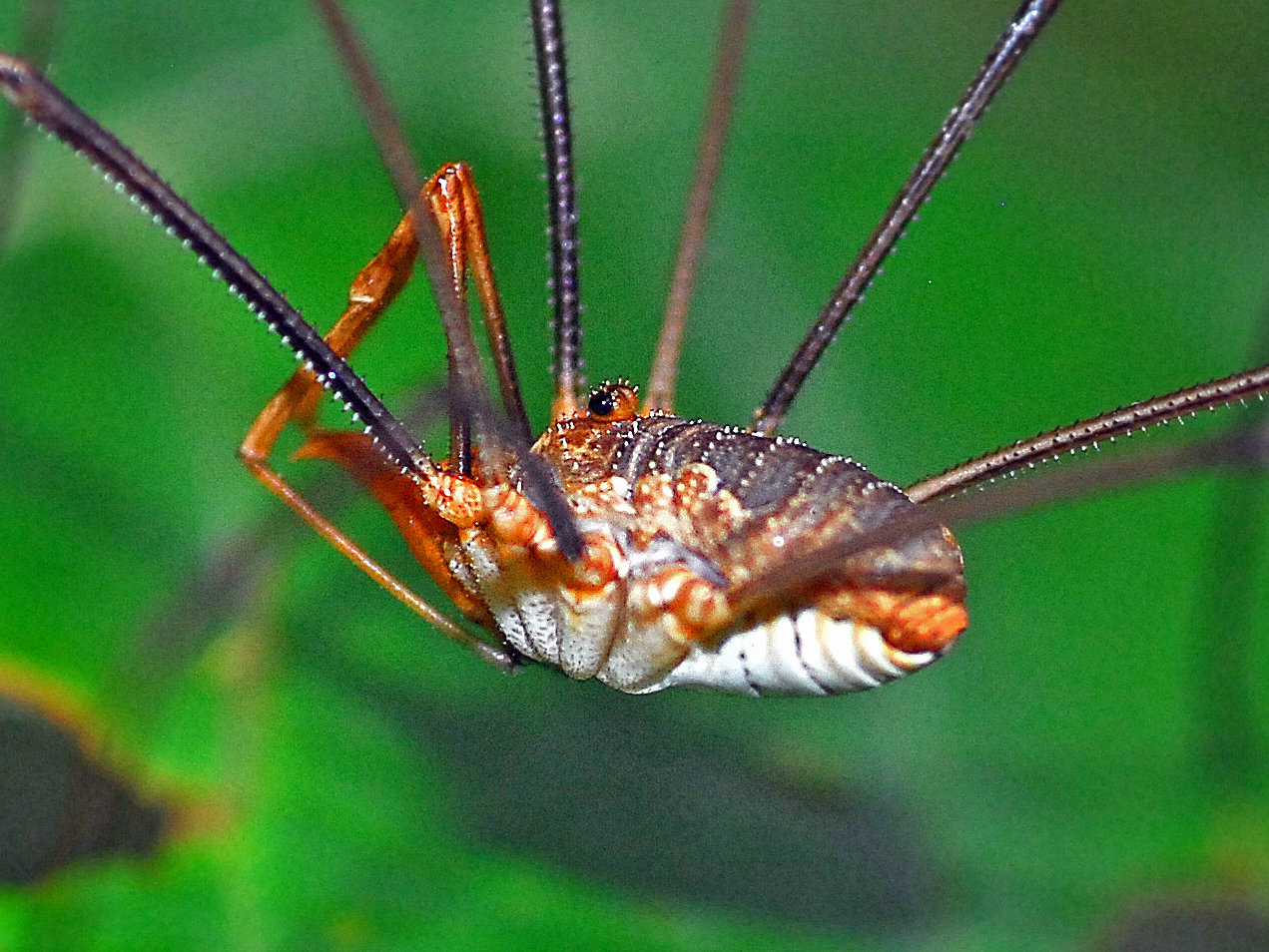
Male side view

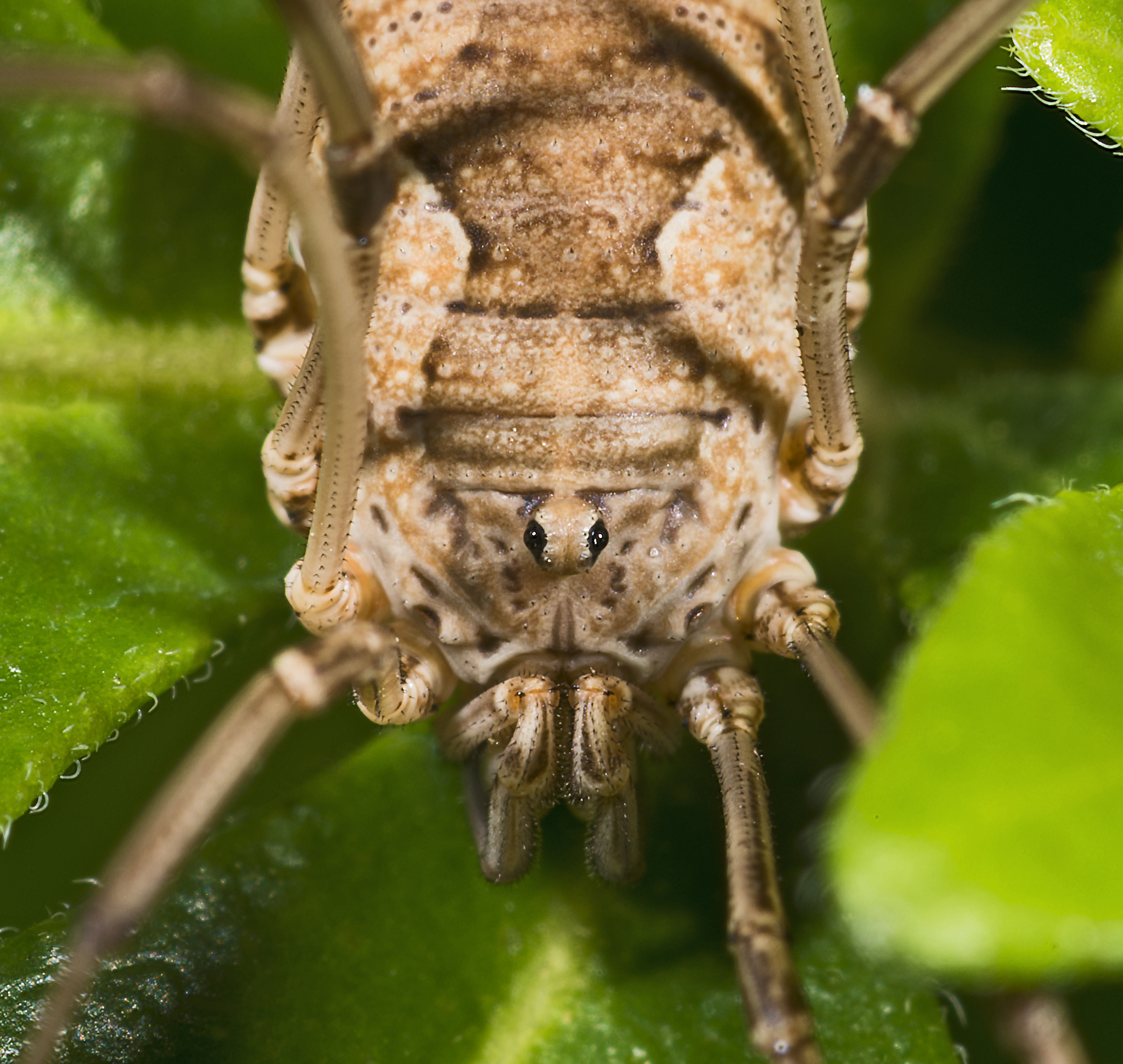
Female

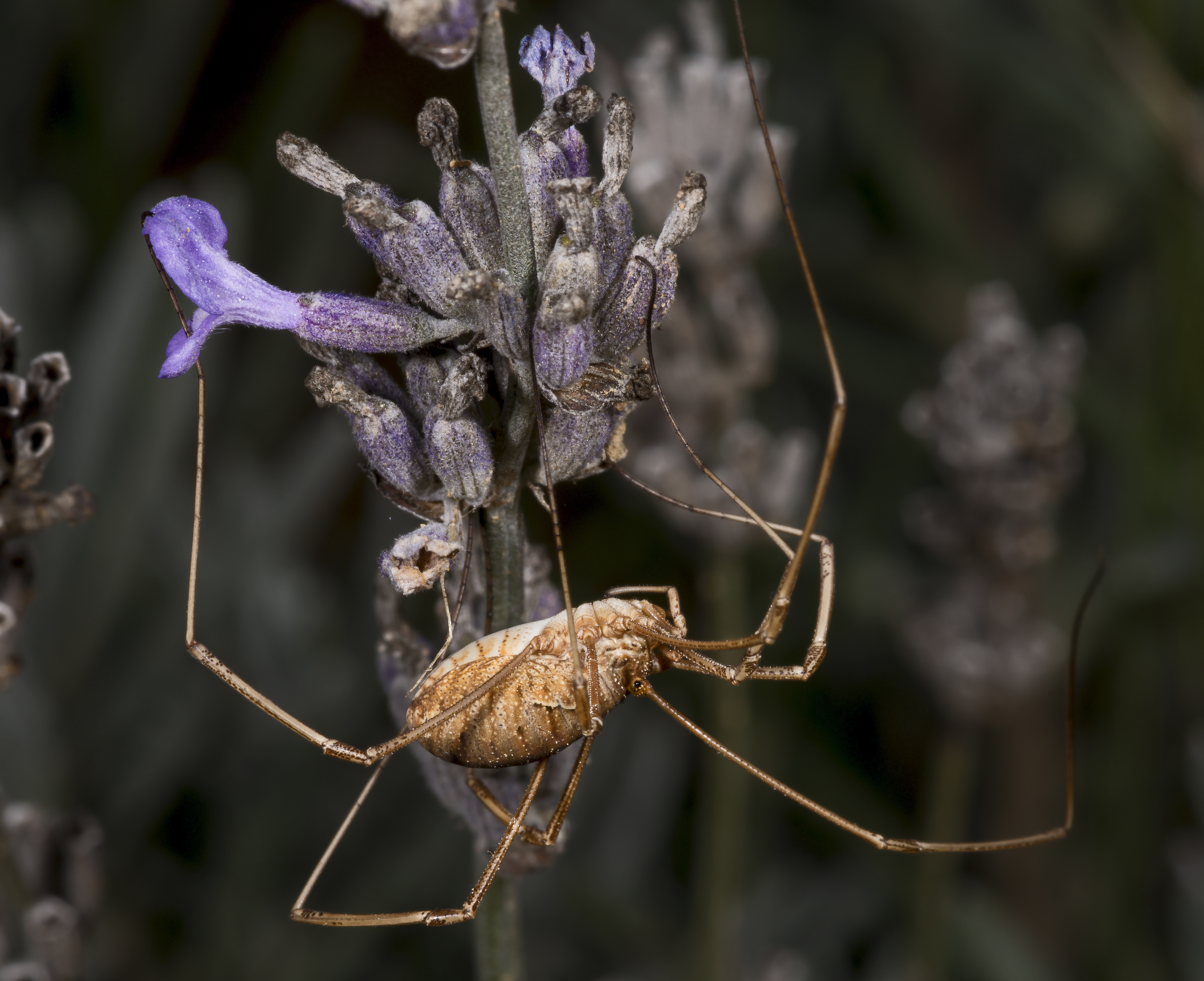
Female side view
