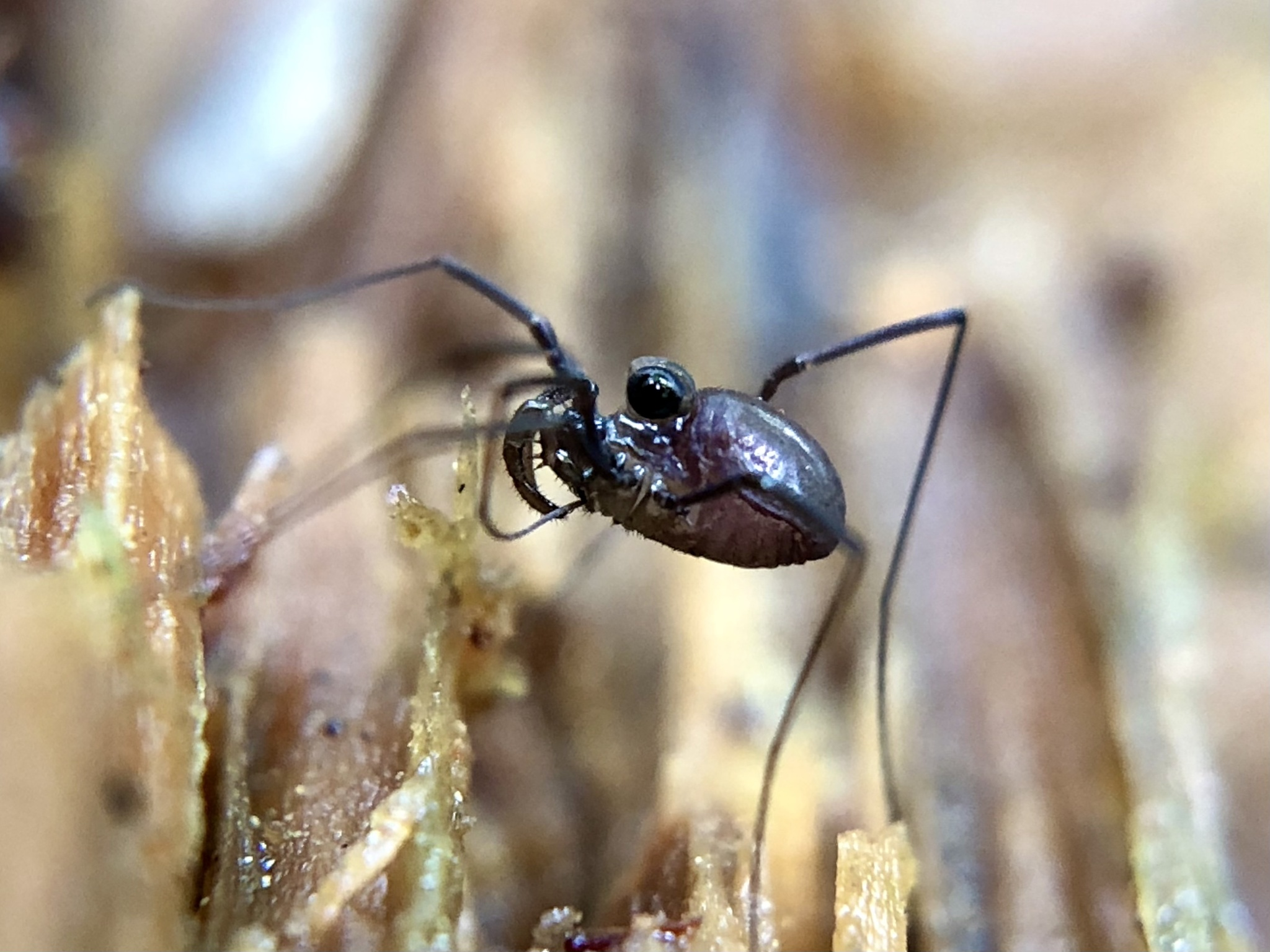

Scientific classification
- Kingdom: Animalia
- Phylum: Arthropoda
- Subphylum: Chelicerata
- Class: Arachnida
- Order: Opiliones
- Family: Caddidae
- Genus: Caddo
- Species: C. pepperella

Binomial name
- Caddo pepperella Shear, 1975

= Caddo pepperella =

Species of harvestman/daddy longlegs

Caddo pepperella is a species of harvestman in the family Caddidae. It is found in North America.

== Etymology ==
The original description by Shear, 1975 states "the specific epithet is derived from the type locality" (p.74) from Pepperell (in Middlesex County, Massachusetts, USA).
