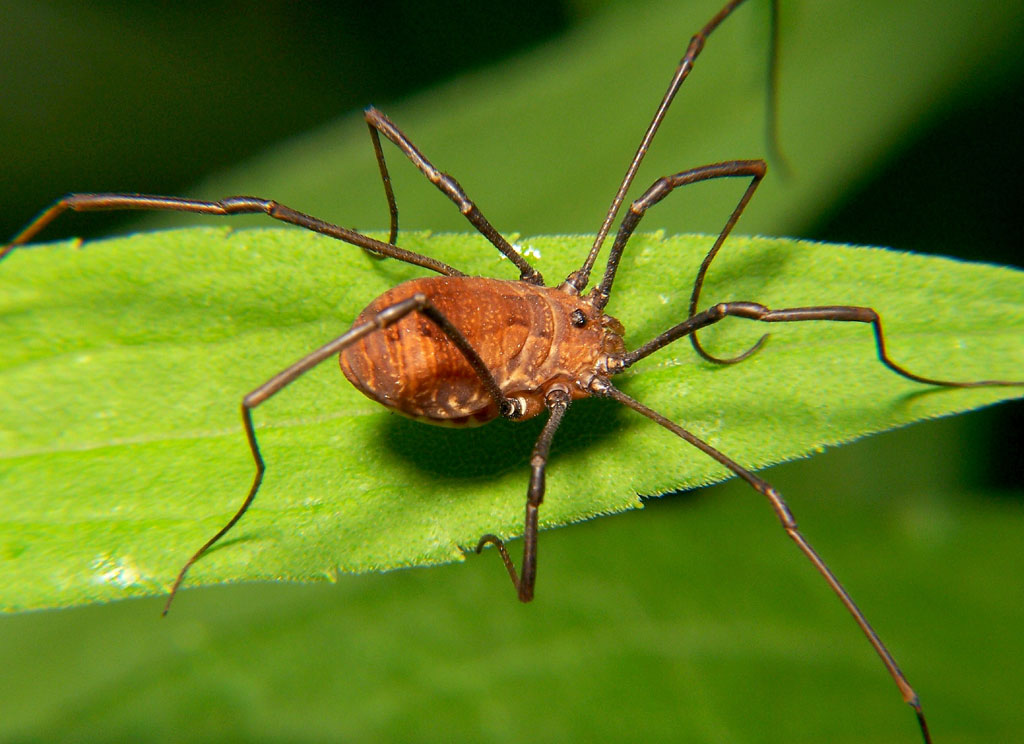
- Hadrobunus grandis

Scientific classification
- Domain: Eukaryota
- Kingdom: Animalia
- Phylum: Arthropoda
- Subphylum: Chelicerata
- Class: Arachnida
- Order: Opiliones
- Family: Sclerosomatidae
- Subfamily: Leiobuninae
- Genus: Hadrobunus; Banks, 1900

Synonyms
- Hadrobrunus Banks, 1900

= Hadrobunus =

Genus of harvestmen

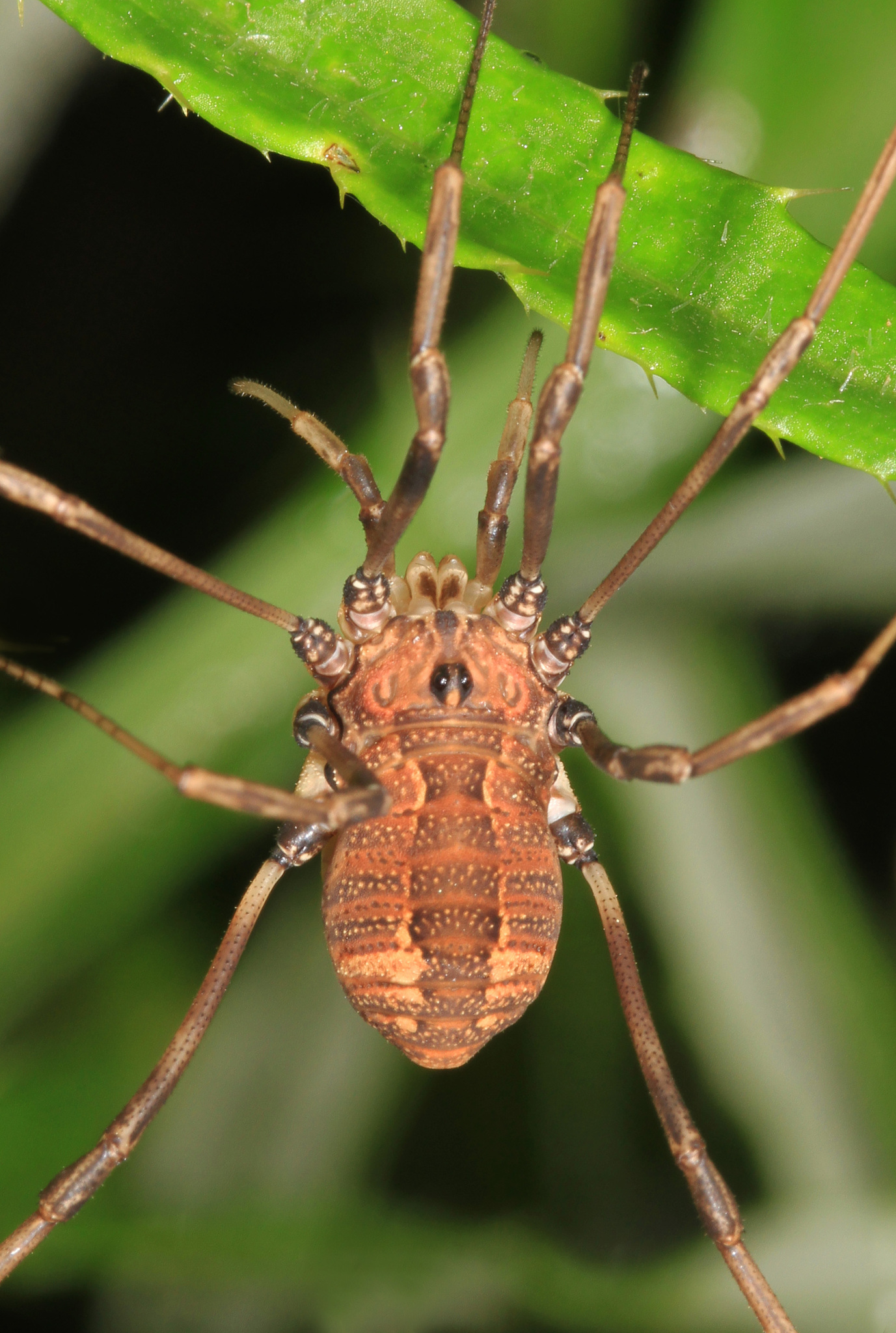
Hadrobunus maculosus, Virginia

Hadrobunus is a genus of harvestmen in the family Sclerosomatidae. There are about six described species in Hadrobunus, found mainly in the eastern United States and Mexico.

== Species ==
These six species belong to the genus Hadrobunus:

- Hadrobunus davisi Goodnight & Goodnight, 1942 (Mexico)
- Hadrobunus fusiformis Shultz, 2010 (Eastern United States)
- Hadrobunus grandis (Say, 1821) (Eastern United States)
- Hadrobunus knighti Goodnight & Goodnight, 1942 (Mexico)
- Hadrobunus maculosus (Wood, 1868) (Eastern United States)
- Hadrobunus nonsacculatus Shultz, 2012 (Eastern United States)
