= Lanthanopilio =

Scientific classification
- Domain: Eukaryota
- Kingdom: Animalia
- Phylum: Arthropoda
- Subphylum: Chelicerata
- Class: Arachnida
- Order: Opiliones
- Family: Globipedidae
- Genus: Lanthanopilio; Cokendolpher & Cokendolpher, 1984
- Species: L. chickeringi

Binomial name
- Lanthanopilio chickeringi (Roewer, 1956)

Genus of harvestmen/daddy longlegs

Lanthanopilio chickeringi is a species of harvestmen in a monotypic genus in the family Globipedidae.
