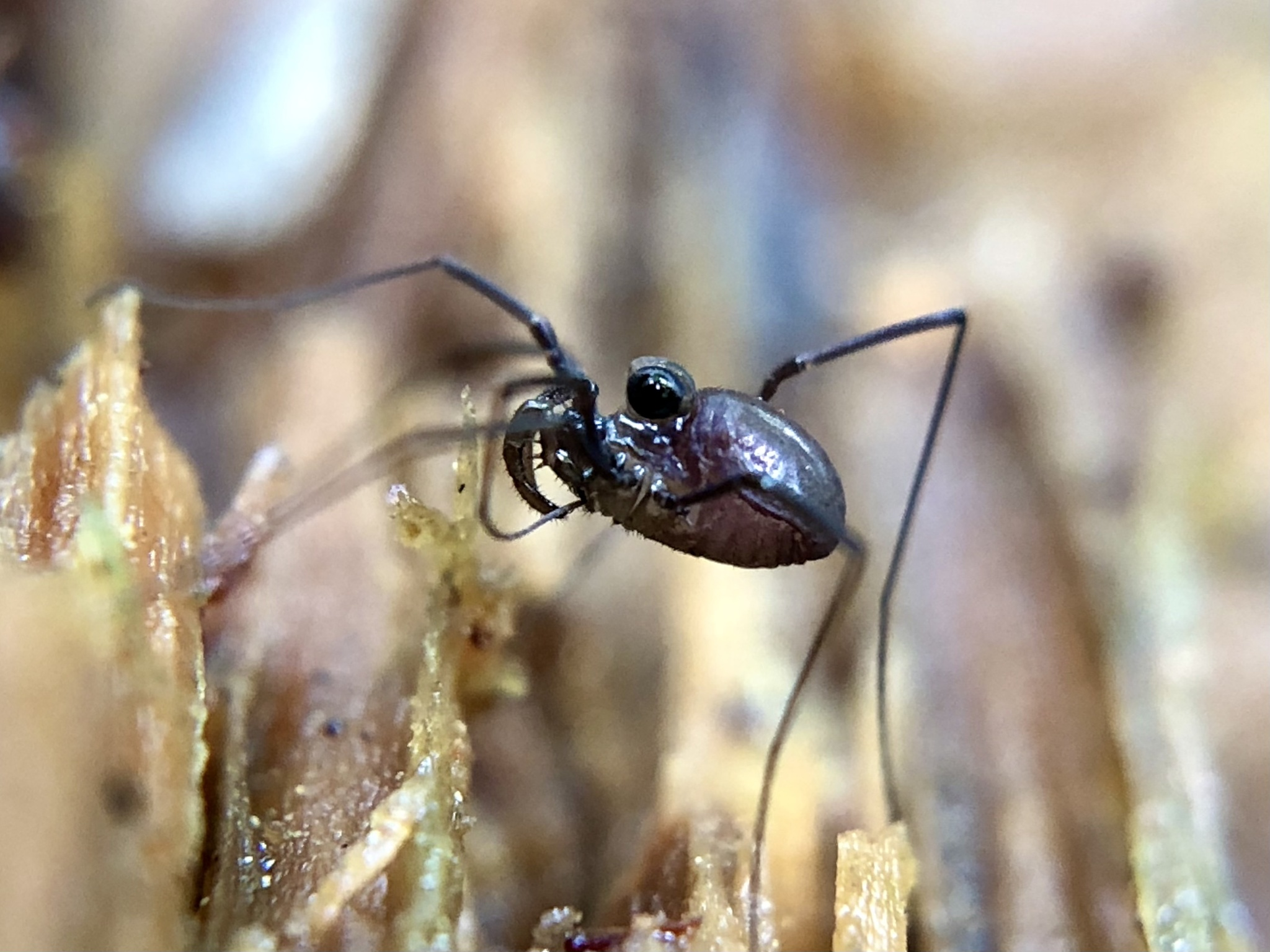
- Caddo pepperella
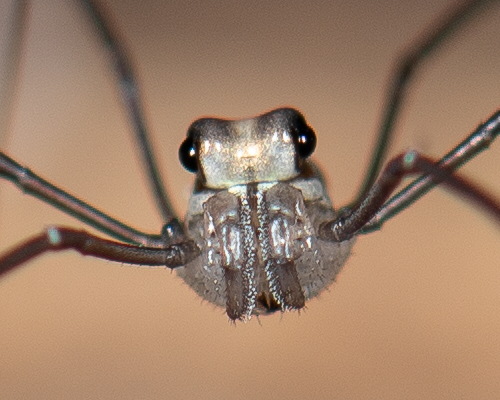
- Close-up view of Caddo agilis showcasing their massive eyes.

Scientific classification
- Kingdom: Animalia
- Phylum: Arthropoda
- Subphylum: Chelicerata
- Class: Arachnida
- Order: Opiliones
- Family: Caddidae
- Genus: Caddo; Banks, 1892

Type species
- Caddo agilis Banks, 1892

Diversity
- 2 species (plus 1 extinct)

= Caddo (harvestman) =

Genus of harvestmen

Caddo is a genus of harvestmen that belongs to the family Caddidae. There are two described species in Caddo. All known species are found in North America and Eastern Asia.

Members of this genus are small with ovular bodies. They are notable for having massive eyes.

== Distribution ==
Both species have a disjunct distribution being found in North America in the eastern United States and Canada and in Eastern Asia in South Korea, Japan and the Kuril Islands of Russia.

=== Origin of disjunct distribution ===
William Shear originally suggested that Caddo pepperella evolved in North America from Caddo agilis as a paedomorphic variant of the species. Caddo pepperella obtained a smaller size possibly adapting to the shorter growing seasons that is associated with the glacial conditions of the Pleistocene epoch. However, the discovery of Caddo pepperella in Japan required an improbable recent dispersal between eastern North America and Japan which is inconsistent with the hypothesis suggested by Shear. Shear would go one countering with the parallel-evolution hypothesis that suggests that Caddo pepperella may evolved independently in North America and Japan during the Pleistocene. However, Seisho Suzuki suggested the habitat-fragmentation hypothesis saying that both species originally inhabited a circumboreal ecosystem that now consists of isolated postglacial fragments in eastern Asia and eastern North America.

Phylogenetic results suggest that these two species were their own distinct species prior to obtaining disjunct distributions.

== Taxonomy ==
=== Taxonomic history ===
The genus was established with the description of Caddo agilis in 1892 by Nathan Banks, an American entomologist. Cyrus R. Crosby would describe two additional species, Caddo boopis and Caddo glaucopis, in 1902 near Ithaca, New York. However, the paper he would publish his descriptions of the species were confusing with a figure of a pedipalp of Caddo boopis being labeled as Caddo glaucopis. This error was made in part by the publication by Banks describing Caddo agilis failing to mention that the type specimen was not a mature specimen. Carl Friedrich Roewer would perpetuate the error made by Crosby when compiling the landmark systematic work Die Weberknechte der Erde (Harvestman of the World). In 1924 Crosby would realize his error and publish a correction synomizing Caddo glaucopis with Caddo agilis.

In 1904, Filippo Silvestri would describe a harvestman from Chile under the name Acropsopilio chilensis that was peculiar for being similar to the genus Caddo. Carl Friedrich Roewer would establish the family Acropsopilionidae for this species incorrectly placing it within the suborder Dyspnoi. In 1948, Clarence J. Goodnight and Goodnight would describe Caddo chomulae from Mexico. The second extant species would be described in 1975 by William Shear, an arachnologist and myriapodologists. In 1958, Seisho Suzuki would report the occurrence of Caddo agilis in Japan.

=== Species ===
There are currently two extant species and one extinct species that belong to the genus Caddo, they are listed below:

- Caddo agilis Banks, 1892 – USA, Canada, Japan, Russia (Kuril Islands)^{i c g b}
- Caddo pepperella Shear, 1975 – USA, Japan, South Korea (?)^{i c g b}
- † Caddo dentipalpis (Koch & Berendt) (Baltic Amber)

Data sources: i = ITIS, c = Catalogue of Life, g = GBIF, b = Bugguide.net
