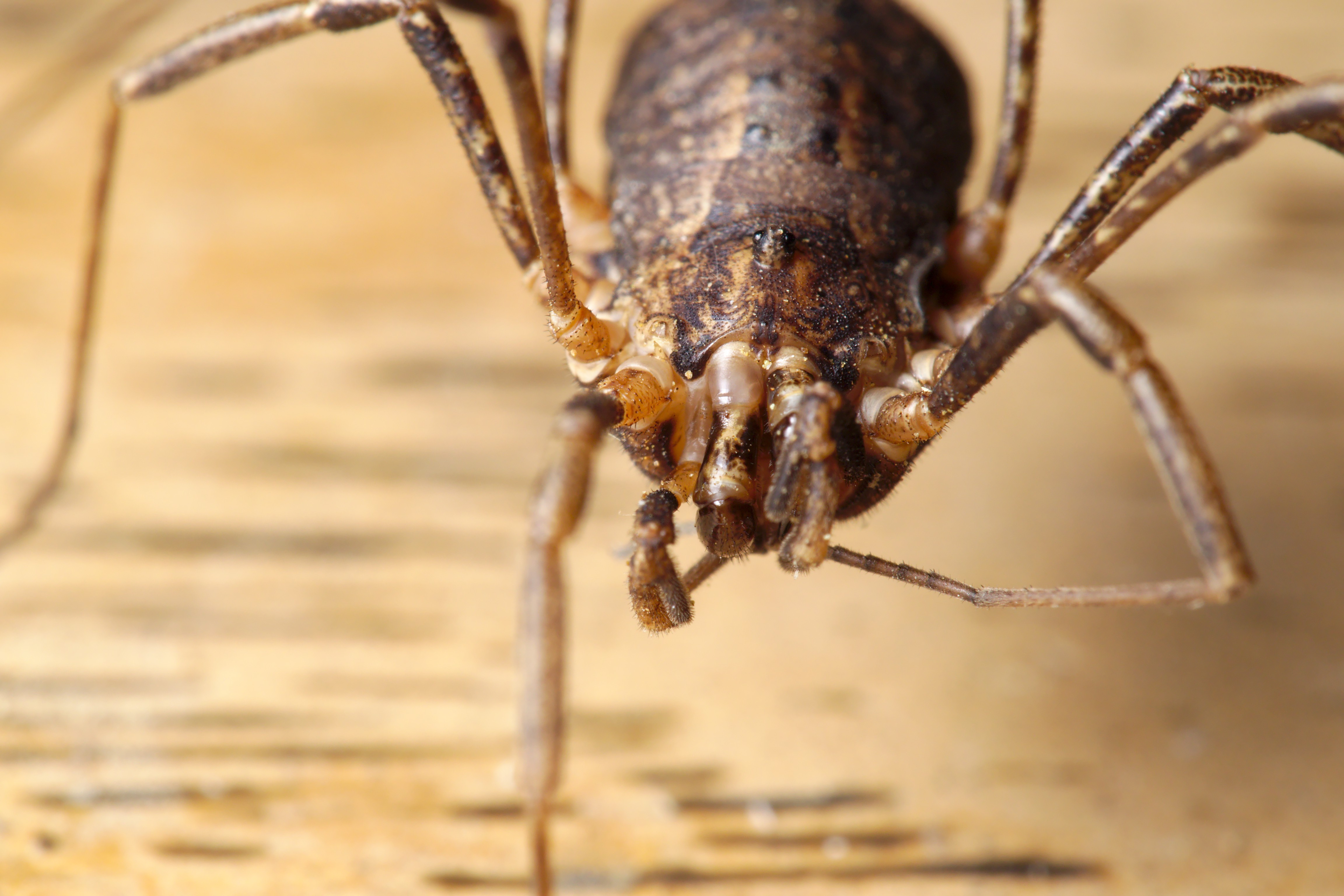
- Protolophus sp.

Scientific classification
- Domain: Eukaryota
- Kingdom: Animalia
- Phylum: Arthropoda
- Subphylum: Chelicerata
- Class: Arachnida
- Order: Opiliones
- Family: Protolophidae
- Genus: Protolophus; Banks, 1893

= Protolophus =

Genus of harvestmen/daddy longlegs

Protolophus is a genus of harvestmen in the family Protolophidae from the Western US.

ITIS Taxonomic note:

- While Protolophidae has been nested within Sclerosomatidae by some workers, it has been traditionally recognized as a separate family (Giribet et al., 2010); although a recent treatment (Kury in Zhang, 2013) does not recognize the family Protolophidae, others do (Hedin et al., 2012; Kury website 'Classification of Opiliones' (2014)).

== Species ==
- Protolophus cockerelli C.J.Goodnight & M.L.Goodnight, 1942
- Protolophus differens C.J.Goodnight & M.L.Goodnight, 1942
- Protolophus dixiensis Chamberlin, 1925
- †Protolophus hoffeinsi Elsaka, Mitov & Dunlop, 2019
- Protolophus longipes Schenkel, 1951
- Protolophus niger C.J.Goodnight & M.L.Goodnight, 1942
- Protolophus rossi C.J.Goodnight & M.L.Goodnight, 1943
- Protolophus singularis Banks, 1893
- Protolophus tuberculatus Banks, 1893
