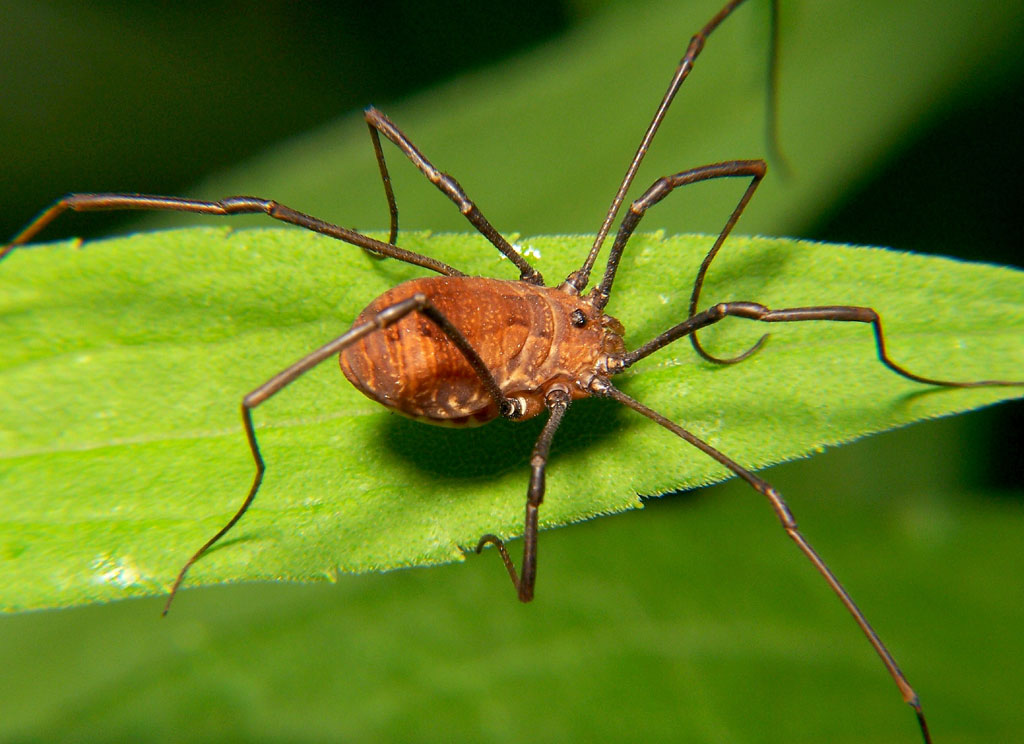
- H. grandis

Scientific classification
- Domain: Eukaryota
- Kingdom: Animalia
- Phylum: Arthropoda
- Subphylum: Chelicerata
- Class: Arachnida
- Order: Opiliones
- Family: Sclerosomatidae
- Genus: Hadrobunus
- Species: H. grandis

Binomial name
- Hadrobunus grandis (Say, 1821)

Synonyms
- Phalangium grandis

= Hadrobunus grandis =

Species of harvestman/daddy longlegs

Hadrobunus grandis is a species of harvestman that occurs in the United States (Georgia, Maryland, North Carolina, Ohio, Indiana, Oklahoma, and Virginia). Adults can be found in early summer. Their backs are brown, with a central marking that can be absent. The legs have a banded appearance. The species is similar to H. maculosus, but the latter has no spines on its back and is darker.
