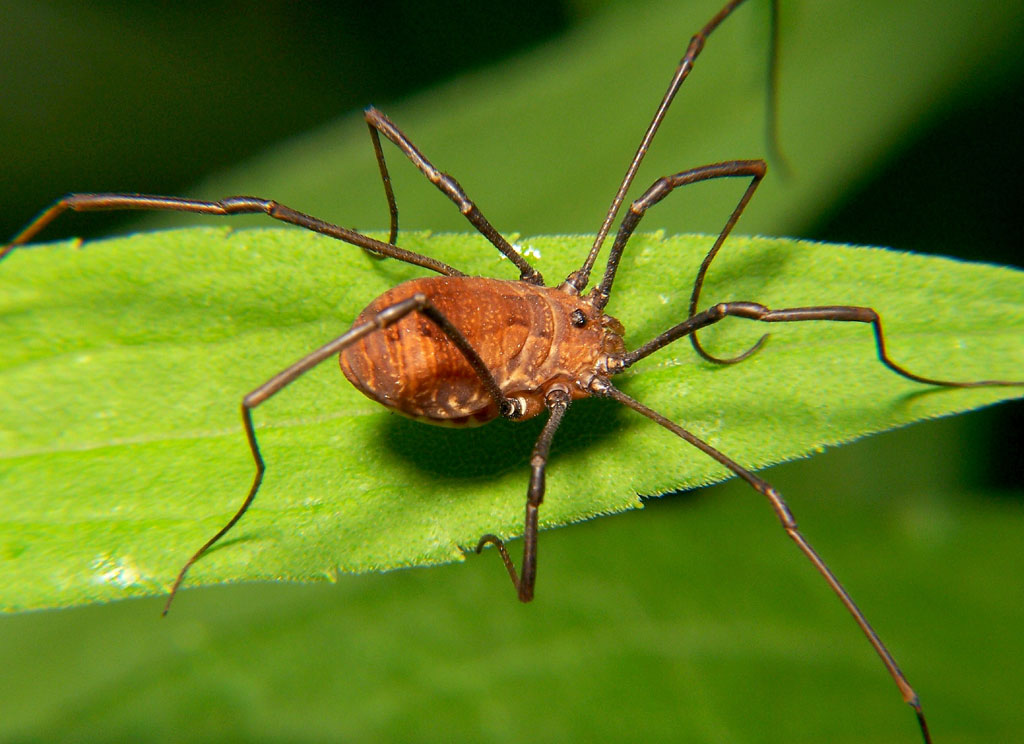
- Hadrobunus grandis

Scientific classification
- Domain: Eukaryota
- Kingdom: Animalia
- Phylum: Arthropoda
- Subphylum: Chelicerata
- Class: Arachnida
- Order: Opiliones
- Suborder: Eupnoi; Hansen & Sørensen, 1904

Superfamilies
- Caddoidea; Phalangioidea

Diversity
- 6 families, > 1,700 species

= Eupnoi =

Eupnoi Temporal range: Devonian–present

Suborder of harvestmen/daddy longlegs

The Eupnoi are a suborder of harvestmen, with more than 200 genera, and about 1,700 described species.

They consist of two superfamilies, the Phalangioidea with many long-legged species common to northern temperate regions, and the small group Caddoidea, which have prominent eyes and spiny pedipalps.

Examples of this suborder include Hadrobunus grandis (Sclerosomatidae), Phalangium opilio and Dicranopalpus ramosus (Phalangiidae).

== Distribution ==
Caddoidea are mostly found in temperate zones of both hemispheres; however, they are known from the Palearctic only from Japan, and from Baltic amber (about 40 million years old). One species known from Japan is also found in North America, where several more species are found. Other species occur in Southern South America, Venezuela, New Zealand and Australia.

Neopilionidae show a Gondwanan distribution, with species found in South America, South Africa and Australia.

Sclerosomatidae are divided into several subfamilies, with Gagrellinae found in the Indo-Malayan and neotropical region, Gyinae at high elevations in the Caucasus, Alps and Nepal, Leiobuninae in the holarctic region down to Costa Rica, and Sclerosomatinae only in the Palearctic.

In the Phalangiidae, the Phalangiinae are most diverse in the Mediterranean, with several endemic genera in nearby coastal Africa. Although there are several Phalangiinae in the Nearctic, they are all introduced. Opilioninae are mostly palearctic, with a few species found in Southeast Asia. Oligolophinae are holarctic, with most species found in Europe. Platybuninae are also found from Europe to the Caucasus, with one find from Sumatra.

== Relationships ==
Two different views exist at the moment: in the traditional view Eupnoi and Dyspnoi form a clade, with Laniatores as a sister group; however recently it has been proposed that Eupnoi are sister to a clade formed by Dyspnoi and Laniatores.

== Systematics ==
Although the two recognized superfamilies Caddoidea and Phalangoidea are probably monophyletic, the limits of families and subfamilies are uncertain in many cases, and are in urgent need of further study.

Genus and species numbers are approximate for after 2020.

- Caddoidea
  - Caddidae (1 genus)
- Phalangioidea
  - Globipedidae (6 genera)
  - Neopilionidae (19 genera)
  - Phalangiidae (about 50 genera)
  - Protolophidae
  - Sclerosomatidae (about 150 genera)
  - - Hesperopilio (1 genus, unplaced to family)

The supposed family "Stygophalangiidae", with its sole described species Stygophalangium karamani Oudemans, 1933 from former Yugoslavia is not a harvestman, but very likely a species of mite. For Monoscutidae, See transfer to the Neopilionidae Enantiobuninae by Taylor (2011).

== See also ==
- Harvestman phylogeny
