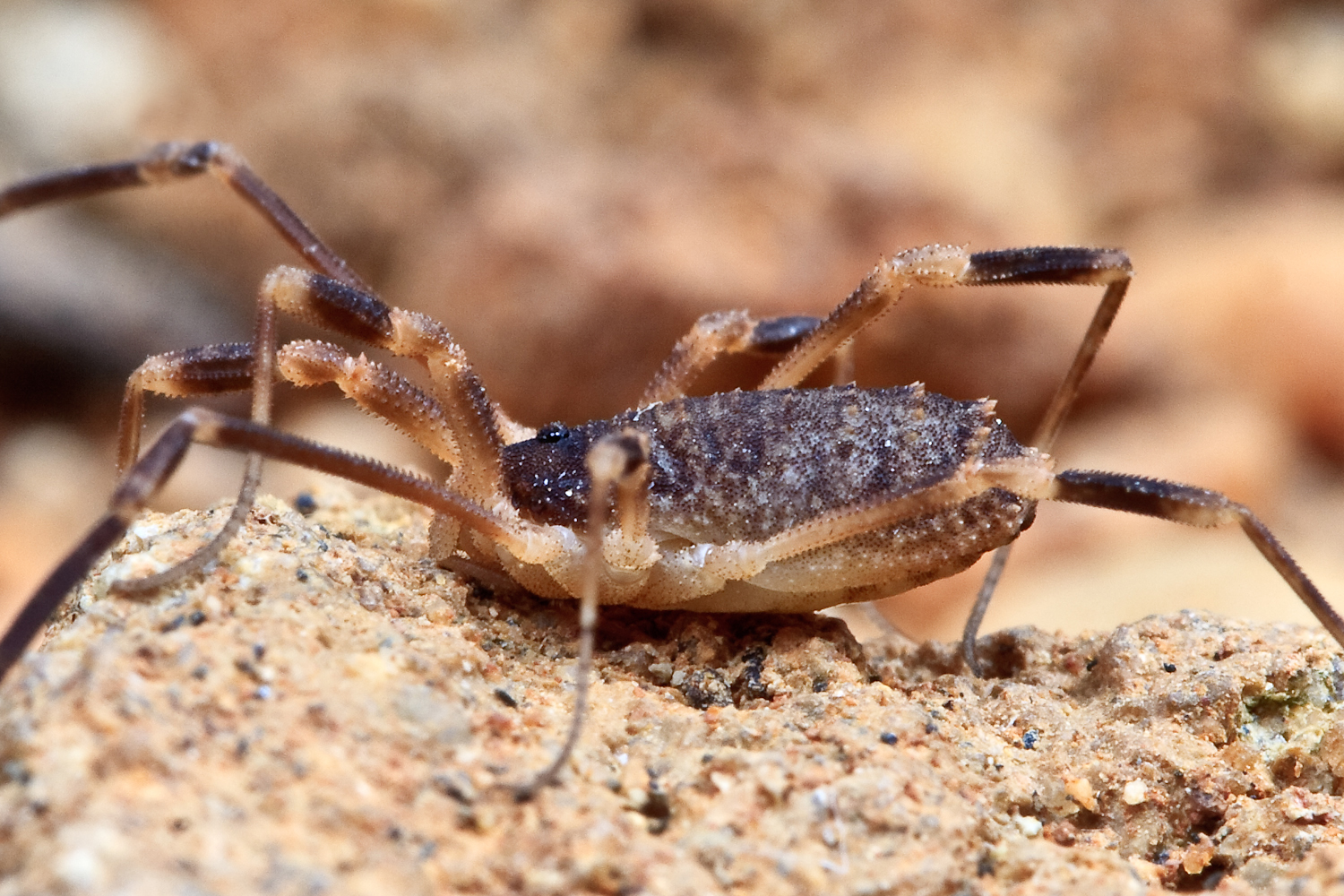
- Dalquestia rugosa

Scientific classification
- Domain: Eukaryota
- Kingdom: Animalia
- Phylum: Arthropoda
- Subphylum: Chelicerata
- Class: Arachnida
- Order: Opiliones
- Suborder: Eupnoi
- Superfamily: Phalangioidea
- Family: Globipedidae; Kury & Cokendolpher, 2020

Genera
- See text

= Globipedidae =

Family of harvestmen/daddy longlegs

The harvestman family Globipedidae is a small lineage comprising 6 genera and some 33 species. They occur in various parts of North America and Central America. They were formerly included as a subfamily of Sclerosomatidae.

== Genera ==
- Dalquestia Cokendolpher, 1984 – USA, Mexico (6 species)
- Diguetinus Roewer, 1912 – Mexico (Jalisco) (1 species)
- Eurybunus Banks, 1893 – USA (Western States), (4 species)
- Globipes Banks, 1893 – USA, Mexico (3 species)
- Lanthanopilio Cokendolpher & Cokendolpher, 1984 – Costa Rica (1 species)
- Metopilio Roewer, 1911 – Mexico and Central America (18 species)
