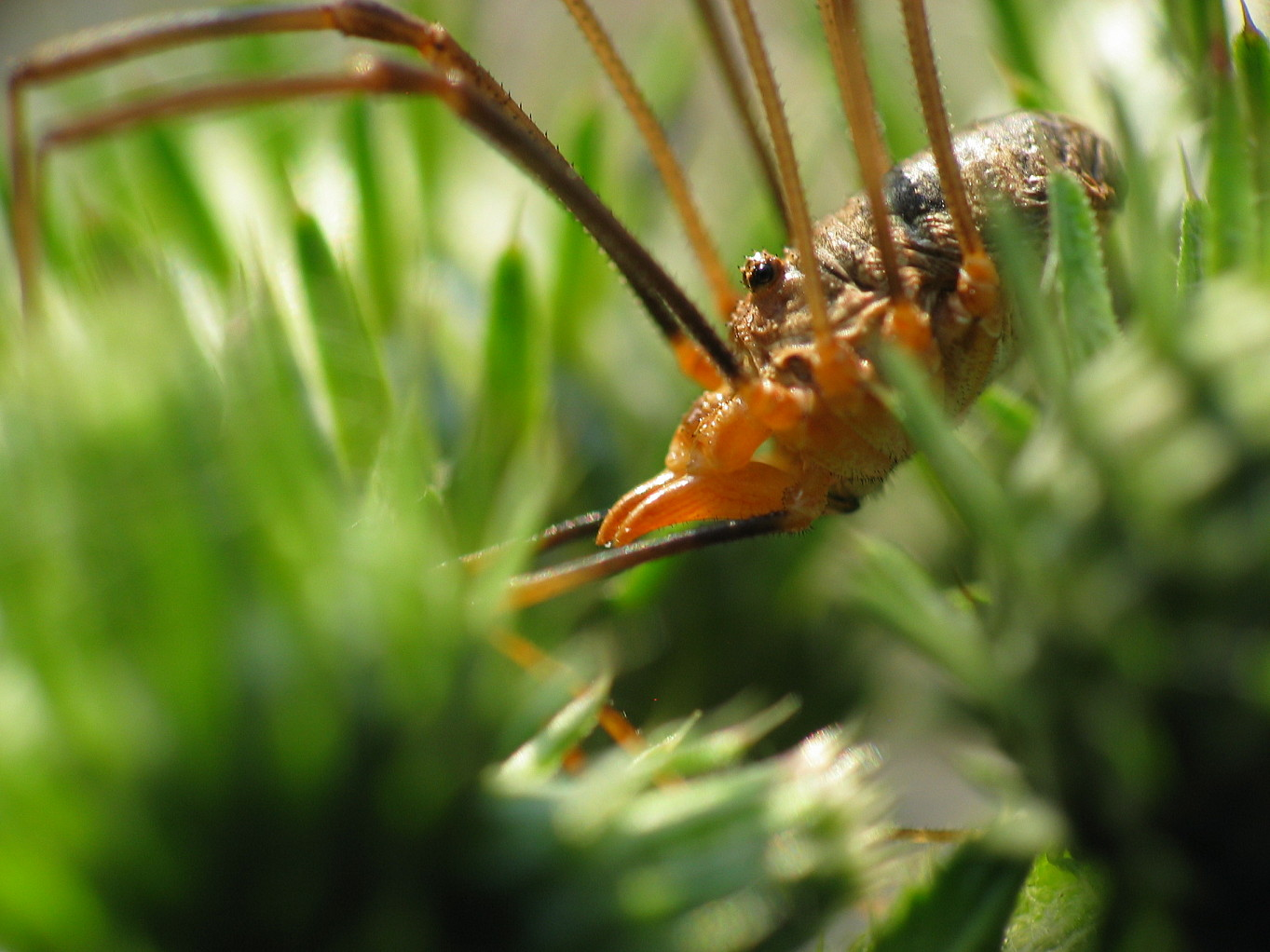
- Male Phalangium opilio

Scientific classification
- Kingdom: Animalia
- Phylum: Arthropoda
- Subphylum: Chelicerata
- Class: Arachnida
- Order: Opiliones
- Family: Phalangiidae
- Genus: Phalangium; Linnaeus, 1758

Type species
- Phalangium iberica Schenkel, 1939

Synonyms
- Cerastoma

= Phalangium =

Genus of harvestmen/daddy longlegs

Phalangium is a genus of harvestmen that occur mostly in the Old World. The best known species is Phalangium opilio, which is so common in many temperate regions that it is simply called "harvestman".

== Species ==
The genus Phalangium contains the following species:

- Phalangium aegyptiacum Savigny, 1816 (Egypt)
- Phalangium bilineatum Fabricius, 1779
- Phalangium cancroides Müller, 1776
- Phalangium clavipus Roewer, 1911 (Mallorca)
- Phalangium conigerum Sørensen, 1912
- Phalangium coronatum Fabricius, 1779
- Phalangium crassum Dufour, 1831
- Phalangium cristatum Olivier, 1791
- Phalangium grossipes Müller, 1776
- Phalangium iberica Schenkel, 1939 (Spain)
- Phalangium incanum C. L. Koch, 1839
- Phalangium licenti Schenkel, 1953
- Phalangium ligusticum (Roewer, 1923) (Liguria, Italy)
- Phalangium lineola Dufour, 1831
- Phalangium litorale Störm, 1762
- Phalangium lupatum Eichwald, 1830
- Phalangium mamillatum Gervais, 1844 (Spain)
- Phalangium mesomelas Soerensen, 1910 (Kilimanjaro)
- Phalangium minutum Meade, 1861
- Phalangium mucronatum Müller, 1776
- Phalangium muscorum Latreille, 1802
- Phalangium opilio Linnaeus, 1761 (Holarctic)
- Phalangium ortoni Wood, 1869 (Ecuador)
- Phalangium pallidum Müller, 1776
- Phalangium palmatum Herbst, 1797
- Phalangium punctipes (L. Koch, 1878) (Armenia)
- Phalangium pygnogonum Müller, 1776
- Phalangium riedeli Starega, 1973
- Phalangium rubens Hermann, 1804
- Phalangium rudipalpe Gervais, 1849
- Phalangium savignyi Savignyi, 1826 (Egypt, Italy)
- Phalangium spiniferum Cantor, 1842 (Zhoushan, China)
- Phalangium targionii (Canestrini, 1871) (Mediterranean)
- Phalangium tricuspidatum Dufour, 1831
- Phalangium uncatum Hermann, 1804 (Austria)

== Valid species (as of 2014) ==
Of the 35 species listed above, 6 are valid [P. ligusticum, P. opilio (originally described in 1758, not 1761), P. punctipes, P. riedeli, P. savignyi (originally described by Audouin, not Savigny) & P. targionii], 3 belong to different genera of the opiliones, 4 belong to different arachnid orders, 2 are species inquirenda and 20 are nomina dubia.

The type species is P. opilio, not P. iberica [which has been synonymised with Metaphalangium cirtanum (CL Koch, 1839)], as designated by Latreille in 1810.

In addition to the 6 valid names from the above list, the genus Bactrophalangium (with its 2 species) has been synonymized into Phalangium, 8 species have been described since 2005 and one species described in 1953 is missing from the above list, making a total of 17 species currently recognized as valid.
