= Prashant P. Sharma =

Indian-American invertebrate biologist

- Born: March 15, 1984 (age 42)
- Education: AB, Harvard University; PhD, Harvard University

Prashant P. Sharma is an Indian-American invertebrate biologist and a professor of Integrative Biology at the University of Wisconsin-Madison.

== Education ==
Sharma attended Harvard University and completed his undergraduate training in 2006. He earned his Ph.D. from Harvard University in 2012. He was a National Science Foundation postdoctoral fellow at the American Museum of Natural History.

== Career ==
Sharma joined the University of Wisconsin-Madison in 2015. His research group works on phylogenomics, evolutionary developmental biology, and comparative genomics of ancient invertebrate groups, with emphasis on chelicerate arthropods. He is the director of the Zoological Museum of the University of Wisconsin-Madison. He received a distinguished Class of 1955 Teaching Excellence Award and a James R. Underkofler Teaching Excellent Award.

His early work focused on the systematics and biogeography of the armored harvestmen (Laniatores) from the South Pacific. In 2011, he described three new families of harvestmen from the Paleotropics and showed that one family of armored harvestmen is capable of extreme dispersal, in contrast to the rest of this arachnid order. His research group later discovered a suborder of fossil daddy-long-legs with four eyes called Tetraophthalmi, whereas all living species only have two eyes.

His group is best known for using genome duplications to understand the relationships of arachnids. He proposed a grouping of arachnids with book lungs as well as pseudoscorpions, which is called "Arachnopulmonata" and is united by a shared whole genome duplication. He proposed that horseshoe crabs are part of Arachnida and that arachnids independently colonized land more than once, using both genomes and fossils. His team sequenced the first chromosome-level genome of sea spiders and showed that they lack abdomens because of gene loss.

He has contributed to the understanding of phylogenetic relationships of minor chelicerate orders, especially scorpions. His team's research led to a modern classification of scorpion families based on genome-scale data. He showed that the diversification of scorpions' mammal-targeting venom peptides is relatively recent and coincided with the diversification of mammal orders. His group generated the first phylogenetic tree of Solifugae (sun spiders) and established two suborders to accommodate their relationships. He applied phylogenomic tools to create a robust phylogenetic tree for Pycnogonida (sea spiders) and showed that they have weathered mass extinction events better than most marine invertebrates. In addition, he led efforts to establish the first molecular phylogeny of Amblypygi (whip spiders), through the rediscovery of a relictual lineage called Paracharontidae after over a century.

His laboratory works on the genetics and development of daddy-long-legs (Opiliones or "harvestmen") and spiders. He previously showed that spiders recycled leg-patterning genes to make the segments of their heads, an example of an evolutionary process called cooption. His team later showed that a gene duplicate restricted to Arachnopulmonata is responsible for making all eye types of spiders. His group sequenced the first Opiliones genome and created "daddy-short-legs" using gene silencing to understand how daddy-long-legs make their long legs. He also showed that modern daddy-long-legs have six eyes, contrary to the textbook understanding of Opiliones vision.

== Eponyms ==
The following species are named after Sharma.

- Petrobunoides sharmai is the oldest known fossil of Laniatores (Opiliones).
- Austropurcellia sharmai
- Troglosiro sharmai
