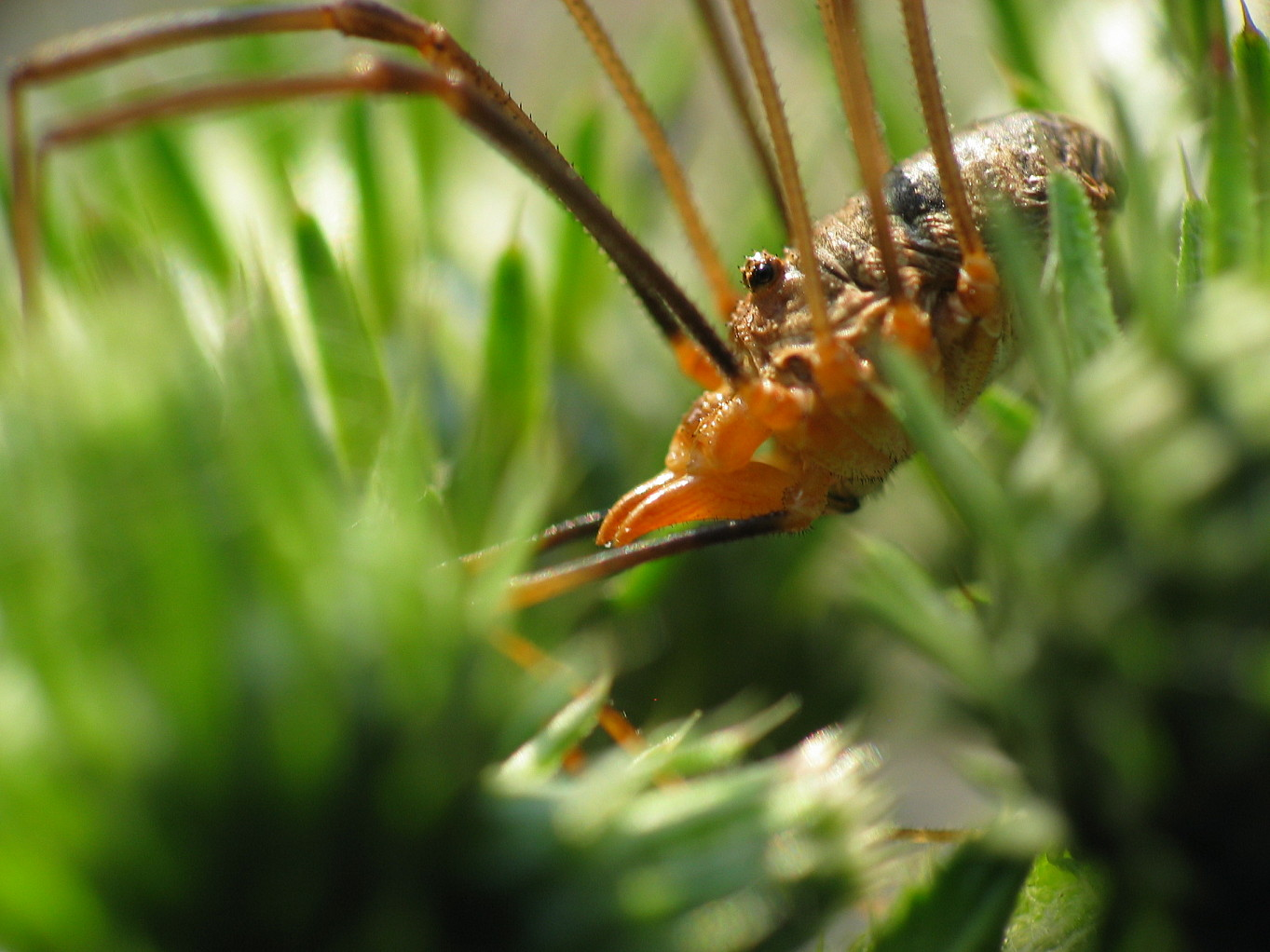
- Male Phalangium opilio

Scientific classification
- Domain: Eukaryota
- Kingdom: Animalia
- Phylum: Arthropoda
- Subphylum: Chelicerata
- Class: Arachnida
- Order: Opiliones
- Suborder: Eupnoi
- Superfamily: Phalangioidea; Latrelle, 1802

Families
- See text

= Phalangioidea =

Superfamily of harvestmen/daddy longlegs

Phalangioidea is a superfamily of the harvestman suborder Eupnoi with five recognized families and more than 1,500 species.

It is not to be confused with the similar spelled subfamily Phalangodoidea, which is also a harvestman superfamily, but within the suborder Laniatores.

== Families ==
- Globipedidae (6 genera, 34 species)
- Neopilionidae (19 genera, 78 species)
- Phalangiidae (49 genera, 381 species)
- Protolophidae (1 genus Protolophus) Banks, 1893
- Sclerosomatidae (148 genera, 1273 species)
