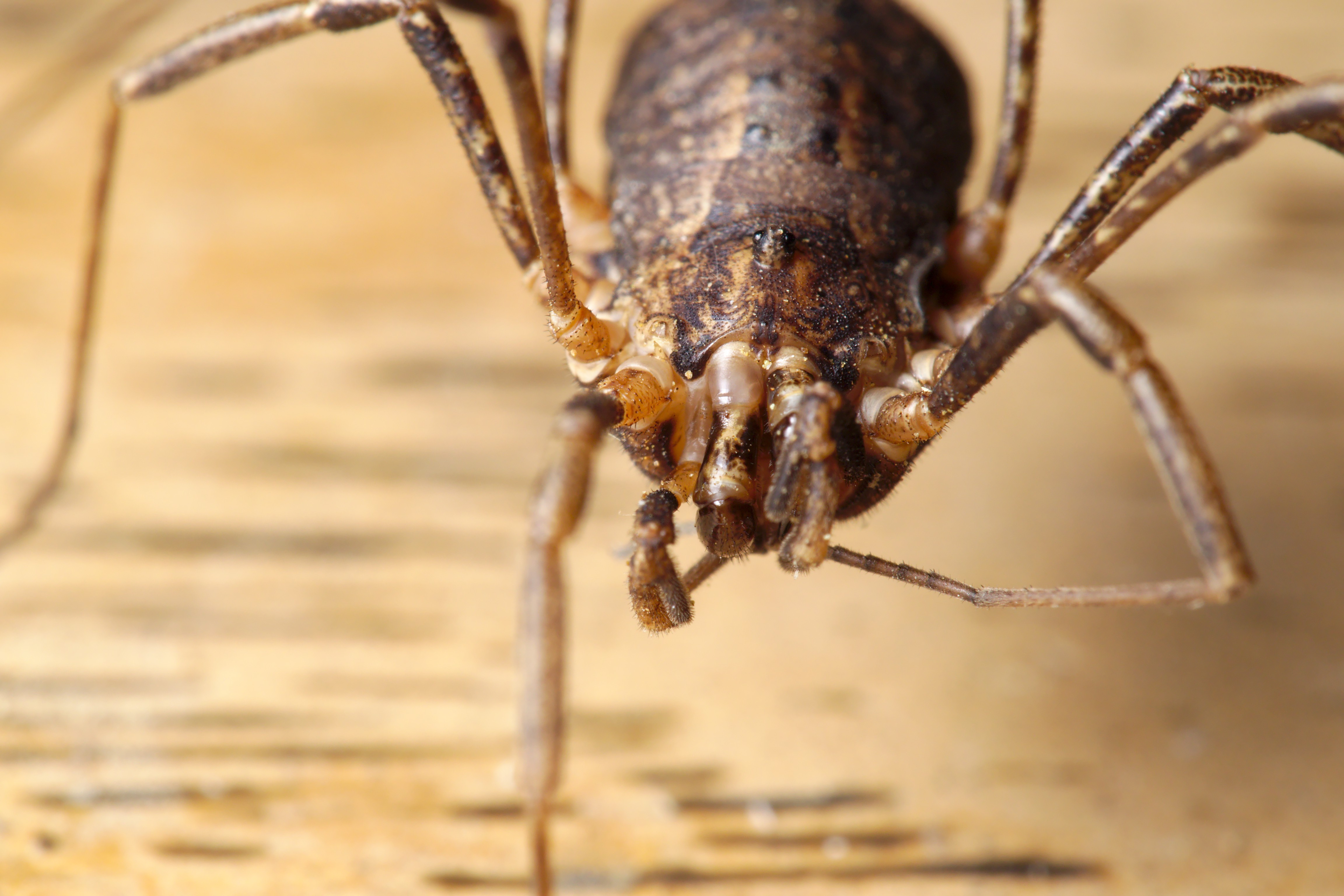
- Protolophus

Scientific classification
- Domain: Eukaryota
- Kingdom: Animalia
- Phylum: Arthropoda
- Subphylum: Chelicerata
- Class: Arachnida
- Order: Opiliones
- Superfamily: Phalangioidea
- Family: Protolophidae; Banks, 1893

= Protolophidae =

Family of harvestmen/daddy longlegs

Protolophidae is a family of harvestmen in the order Opiliones. There is at least one genus, Protolophus, and about six described species in Protolophidae found in Western North America.

ITIS Taxonomic note:

- While Protolophidae has been nested within Sclerosomatidae by some workers, it has been traditionally recognized as a separate family (Giribet et al., 2010); although a recent treatment (Kury in Zhang, 2013) does not recognize the family Protolophidae, others do (Hedin et al., 2012; Kury website 'Classification of Opiliones' (2014)).
