= List of Triaenonychidae species =

This is a list of the described species of the harvestman family Triaenonychidae. The data is taken from Joel Hallan's Biology Catalog, plus some later updates.

== Adaeinae Pocock, 1902 ==
- Adaeulum Roewer, 1915

- Adaeulum areolatum (Pocock, 1903) — South Africa
- Adaeulum bicolor Lawrence, 1931 — South Africa
- Adaeulum brevidentatum Lawrence, 1934 — South Africa
- Adaeulum coronatum Kauri, 1961 — South Africa
- Adaeulum godfreyi Lawrence, 1931 — South Africa [inc. synonomy of Adaeulum coxidens)
- Adaeulum humifer Lawrence, 1963 — South Africa
- Adaeulum monticola Lawrence, 1939 — South Africa
- Adaeulum moruliferum Lawrence, 1938 — South Africa
- Adaeulum robustum Lawrence, 1937 — South Africa
- Adaeulum supervidens Lawrence, 1933 — South Africa
- Adaeulum warreni Lawrence, 1933 — South Africa

- Adaeum Karsch, 1880

- Adaeum asperatum Karsch, 1880 — South Africa
- Adaeum capense (Roewer, 1915) — South Africa
- Adaeum granulosum Lawrence, 1931 — South Africa
- Adaeum hewitti Roewer, 1931 — South Africa
- Adaeum latens Loman, 1898 — South Africa
- Adaeum obtectum Loman, 1898 — South Africa
- Adaeum spatulatum Lawrence, 1931 — South Africa
- Adaeum squamatum Lawrence, 1931 — South Africa

(Note: For New Zealand species previously in Adaeum, see instead under Triregia and Algidia).

- Cryptadaeum Lawrence, 1931

- Cryptadaeum capense Lawrence, 1931 — South Africa

- Dingupa Forster, 1952

- Dingupa glauerti Forster, 1952 — Australia (Western Australia)

- Heteradaeum Lawrence, 1963

- Heteradaeum exiguum Lawrence, 1963 — South Africa

- Larifuga Loman, 1898

- Larifuga avus Starega, 1989 — South Africa
- Larifuga calcaratus Lawrence, 1931 — South Africa
- Larifuga capensis Lawrence, 1931 — South Africa
- Larifuga dentifer Lawrence, 1931 — South Africa
- Larifuga granulosus Lawrence, 1931 — South Africa
- Larifuga mantoni Lawrence, 1934 — South Africa
- Larifuga montanus Lawrence, 1931 — South Africa
- Larifuga onerarius Kauri, 1961 — South Africa
- Larifuga rugosus (Guérin-Méneville, 1838) — South Africa
- Larifuga weberi Loman, 1898 — South Africa

- Larifugella Staręga, 1992

- Larifugella afra Lawrence, 1933 — South Africa
- Larifugella longipalpis Lawrence, 1934 — South Africa
- Larifugella natalensis (Lawrence, 1931) — South Africa
- Larifugella valida Lawrence, 1963 — South Africa
- Larifugella zuluana Lawrence, 1937 — South Africa

(Note: The name Larifugella was previously published by Lawrence, 1933, but unavailable because published after 1930 without fixation of a type species).

- Micradaeum Lawrence, 1931

- Micradaeum rugosum Lawrence, 1931 — South Africa

- Montadaeum Lawrence, 1931

- Montadaeum purcelli Lawrence, 1931 — South Africa

- Paradaeum Lawrence, 1931

- Paradaeum rattrayi Lawrence, 1931 — South Africa

== Triaenonychinae ==
Triaenonychinae Sørensen, in L. Koch 1886

- Acumontia Loman, 1898

- Acumontia alluaudi (Roewer, 1914) — Madagascar
- Acumontia armata Loman, 1898 — Madagascar
- Acumontia capitata (Lawrence, 1959)
- Acumontia cowani Pocock, 1903 — Madagascar
- Acumontia draconensis Lawrence, 1939 — South Africa
- Acumontia echinata Pocock, 1903 — Madagascar
- Acumontia flavispinus (Lawrence, 1959)
- Acumontia hystrix (Lawrence, 1959)
- Acumontia lomani (Roewer, 1914) — Madagascar
- Acumontia lomani (Roewer, 1914) — Madagascar (preoccupied)
- Acumontia longipes Lawrence, 1959
- Acumontia majori Pocock, 1902
- Acumontia milloti (Lawrence, 1959)
- Acumontia natalensis Lawrence, 1931 — South Africa
- Acumontia pococki Roewer, 1914 — Madagascar
- Acumontia roberti Pocock, 1903 — Madagascar
- Acumontia roeweri Starega, 1992
- Acumontia rostrata Pocock, 1902 — Madagascar
- Acumontia soerenseni (Roewer, 1914) — Madagascar
- Acumontia spinifrons (Roewer, 1914) — Madagascar
- Acumontia venator (Roewer, 1931) — Madagascar

- Allonuncia Hickman, 1958

- Allonuncia grandis Hickman, 1958

- Amatola Lawrence, 1931

- Amatola armata (Lawrence, 1938) — South Africa
- Amatola dentifrons Lawrence, 1931 — South Africa
- Amatola durbanica (Lawrence, 1937) — South Africa
- Amatola maritima (Lawrence, 1937) — South Africa
- Amatola setifemur (Lawrence, 1931) — South Africa
- Amatola unidentata (Lawrence, 1937) — South Africa

- Ankaratrix Lawrence, 1959

- Ankaratrix cancrops Lawrence, 1959
- Ankaratrix illota Lawrence, 1959

- Ankylonuncia Hickman, 1958

- Ankylonuncia barrowensis Hickman, 1958
- Ankylonuncia fallax Hickman, 1958
- Ankylonuncia mestoni Hickman, 1958

- Antongila Roewer, 1931

- Antongila spinigera Roewer, 1931 — Madagascar

- Austromontia Lawrence, 1931

- Austromontia bidentata Lawrence, 1934 — South Africa
- Austromontia caledonica Lawrence, 1931 — South Africa
- Austromontia capensis Lawrence, 1931 — South Africa
- Austromontia formosa Lawrence, 1963
- Austromontia litoralis Lawrence, 1934 — South Africa
- Austromontia silvatica Lawrence, 1931 — South Africa

- Austronuncia Lawrence, 1931

- Austronuncia leleupi Lawrence, 1963
- Austronuncia spinipalpis Lawrence, 1931 — South Africa

- Bezavonia Roewer, 1949

- Bezavonia remyi Roewer, 1949 — Madagascar

- Biacumontia Lawrence, 1931

- Biacumontia cornuta Lawrence, 1931 — South Africa
- Biacumontia elata Kauri, 1961
- Biacumontia fissidens Lawrence, 1931 — South Africa
- Biacumontia maculata Lawrence, 1938 — South Africa
- Biacumontia paucidens Lawrence, 1931 — South Africa
- Biacumontia truncatidens Lawrence, 1931 — South Africa
- Biacumontia variegata Lawrence, 1934 — South Africa

- Brasiloctis Mello-Leitão, 1938

- Brasiloctis bucki Mello-Leitão, 1938 — Brazil

- Breviacantha Kauri, 1954

- Breviacantha gisleni Kauri, 1954

- Bryonuncia Hickman, 1958

- Bryonuncia distincta Hickman, 1958

- Callihamina Roewer, 1942

- Callihamina adelaidia Roewer, 1942 — South Australia

- Callihamus Roewer, 1931

- Callihamus badius Roewer, 1931 — Australia

- Calliuncus Roewer, 1931

- Calliuncus ephippiatus Roewer, 1931
- Calliuncus glaber Kauri, 1954
- Calliuncus labyrinthus Hunt, 1972
- Calliuncus odoratus Hickman, 1958
- Calliuncus vulsus Hickman, 1959

- Ceratomontia Roewer, 1915
- Ceratomontia annae Lawrence, 1934 — South Africa

- Ceratomontia argentina Canals, 1939 — Argentina, Brazil, Uruguay
- Ceratomontia brasiliana Maury, 1999
- Ceratomontia capensis Roewer, 1915 — South Africa
- Ceratomontia centralis Maury & Roig Alsina, 1985 — Argentina
- Ceratomontia cheliplus Roewer, 1931 — South Africa
- Ceratomontia fluvialis Lawrence, 1931 — South Africa
- Ceratomontia irregularis Lawrence, 1931 — South Africa
- Ceratomontia karooensis Lawrence, 1931 — South Africa
- Ceratomontia mendocina Maury & Roig Alsina, 1985 — Argentina
- Ceratomontia minor Lawrence, 1931 — South Africa
- Ceratomontia namaqua Lawrence, 1934 — South Africa
- Ceratomontia nasuta Lawrence, 1934 — South Africa
- Ceratomontia pusilla Lawrence, 1934 — South Africa
- Ceratomontia reticulata Lawrence, 1934 — South Africa
- Ceratomontia rumpiana Lawrence, 1937 — Natal
- Ceratomontia ruticola Lawrence, 1934 — South Africa
- Ceratomontia sanguinea Lawrence, 1934 — South Africa
- Ceratomontia setosa Lawrence, 1931 — South Africa
- Ceratomontia starengai Porto & Pérez-González, 2023
- Ceratomontia tabulae Lawrence, 1931 — South Africa
- Ceratomontia thorni Lawrence, 1934 — South Africa
- Ceratomontia werneri Roewer, 1931 — South Africa

Note: Not Ceratomontia hewitti Lawrence, 1931 which is a junior synonym of Ceratomontia cheliplus Roewer, 1931 per Staręga (1992: 284).

- Cluniella Forster, 1955

- Cluniella distincta Forster, 1955
- Cluniella minuta Forster, 1955
- Cluniella ornata Forster, 1955

- Decarynella Fage, 1945

- Decarynella gracillipes Fage, 1945 — Madagascar

- Diaenobunus Roewer, 1914

- Diaenobunus armatus Roewer, 1914 — New Caledonia

- Diasia Sørensen, 1902

- Diasia araucana E. A. Maury, 1987 — Chile
- Diasia michaelseni Sørensen, 1902 — Chile, Argentina
- Diasia platnicki E. A. Maury, 1987 — Chile

- Equitius Simon, 1880

- Equitius doriae Simon, 1880 — New South Wales
- Equitius altus (Forster, 1955)
- Equitius formidabilis G. S. Hunt, 1985 — New South Wales
- Equitius manicatum (Roewer, 1920) — Queensland
- Equitius montanus G. S. Hunt, 1985 — New South Wales
- Equitius meyersi (Phillips & Grimmett, 1932) — New Zealand
- Equitius richardsae G. S. Hunt, 1985 — New South Wales
- Equitius rotundum (Forster, 1955)
- Equitius spinatus (Pocock, 1903) —New South Wales
- Equitius tambourineus (Roewer, 1920) — Queensland

- Graemontia Lawrence, 1931

- Graemontia bicornigera Lawrence, 1963
- Graemontia bifidens Lawrence, 1931 — South Africa
- Graemontia decorata Lawrence, 1938 — South Africa
- Graemontia dentichelis Lawrence, 1931 — South Africa
- Graemontia erecta Kauri, 1961
- Graemontia natalensis Lawrence, 1937 — Natal

- Gunvoria Kauri, 1961

- Gunvoria spatulata Kauri, 1961

- Hedwiga Roewer, 1931

- Hedwiga manubriata Roewer, 1931 — New Zealand

- Hendea Roewer, 1931

- Hendea hendei Roewer, 1931 — New Zealand
- Hendea aurora Forster, 1965
- Hendea bucculenta Forster, 1954
- Hendea coatesi Forster, 1965
- Hendea fiordensis Forster, 1954
- Hendea maini Forster, 1965
- Hendea maitaia Forster, 1954
- Hendea myersi Forster, 1954

- Hendea myersi myersi Forster, 1954
- Hendea myersi assimilis Forster, 1954
- Hendea myersi cavernicola Forster, 1954
- Hendea myersi ochrea Forster, 1954
- Hendea myersi roeweri Forster, 1954

- Hendea nelsonensis Forster, 1954
- Hendea oconnori Forster, 1954
- Hendea phillippsi Forster, 1954

- Hendea phillippsi phillippsi Forster, 1954
- Hendea phillippsi stiphra Forster, 1954

- Hendea spina Forster, 1965
- Hendea takaka Forster, 1965
- Hendea townsendi Forster, 1965

- Hendeola Forster, 1954

- Hendeola bullata Forster, 1954

- Hendeola bullata bullata Forster, 1954
- Hendeola bullata pterna Forster, 1954

- Hendeola woodwardi Forster, 1954

- Heteronuncia Roewer, 1920

- Heteronuncia robusta Roewer, 1920 — Queensland

- Hickmanoxyomma G. S. Hunt, 1990

- Hickmanoxyomma cavaticum (Hickman, 1958)
- Hickmanoxyomma clarkei G. S. Hunt, 1990 — Tasmania
- Hickmanoxyomma cristatum G. S. Hunt, 1990 — Tasmania
- Hickmanoxyomma eberhardi G. S. Hunt, 1990 — Tasmania
- Hickmanoxyomma gibbergunyar G. S. Hunt, 1990 — Tasmania
- Hickmanoxyomma goedei G. S. Hunt, 1990 — Tasmania
- Hickmanoxyomma tasmanicum (Roewer, 1915) — Tasmania

- Holonuncia Forster, 1955

- Holonuncia cavernicola Forster, 1955
- Holonuncia dewae G. S. Hunt, 1992 — New South Wales
- Holonuncia dispar G. S. Hunt, 1992 — New South Wales
- Holonuncia enigma G. S. Hunt, 1992 — New South Wales
- Holonuncia francesae G. S. Hunt, 1992 — New South Wales
- Holonuncia hamiltonsmithi G. S. Hunt, 1992 — Victoria
- Holonuncia kaputarensis G. S. Hunt, 1992 — New South Wales
- Holonuncia katoomba G. S. Hunt, 1992 — New South Wales
- Holonuncia recta G. S. Hunt, 1992 — Australian Capital Territory
- Holonuncia seriata (Roewer, 1914) — New South Wales
- Holonuncia sussa G. S. Hunt, 1992 — New South Wales
- Holonuncia tuberculata (Roewer, 1915) — New South Wales
- Holonuncia weejasperensis G. S. Hunt, 1992 — New South Wales

- Hovanuncia Lawrence, 1959

- Hovanuncia bidentata Lawrence, 1959
- Hovanuncia monticola Lawrence, 1959
- Hovanuncia pupilla (Lawrence, 1959)

- Ivohibea Lawrence, 1959

- Ivohibea cavernicola Lawrence, 1959

- Lawrencella Strand, 1932

- Lawrencella inermis (Lawrence, 1931) — South Africa

- Leionuncia Hickman, 1958

- Leionuncia levis Hickman, 1958

- Lispomontia Lawrence, 1937

- Lispomontia coxidens Lawrence, 1937 — Natal

- Lomanella Pocock, 1903

- Lomanella raniceps Pocock, 1903 — Tasmania
- Lomanella atrolutea Roewer, 1915 — Tasmania
- Lomanella alata G. S. Hunt & J. L. Hickman, 1993 — Tasmania
- Lomanella ambulatorio G. S. Hunt & J. L. Hickman, 1993 — New South Wales
- Lomanella balooki G. S. Hunt & J. L. Hickman, 1993 — Victoria
- Lomanella blacki G. S. Hunt & J. L. Hickman, 1993 — Victoria
- Lomanella browni G. S. Hunt & J. L. Hickman, 1993 — Tasmania
- Lomanella exigua Hickman, 1958
- Lomanella inermis (Roewer, 1931) — Tasmania
- Lomanella insolentia G. S. Hunt & J. L. Hickman, 1993 — New South Wales
- Lomanella kallista Forster, 1949 — Australia
- Lomanella parva Forster, 1955
- Lomanella peltonychium G. S. Hunt & J. L. Hickman, 1993 — Western Australia
- Lomanella promontorium G. S. Hunt & J. L. Hickman, 1993 — Victoria
- Lomanella quasiparva G. S. Hunt & J. L. Hickman, 1993 — Tasmania
- Lomanella revelata G. S. Hunt & J. L. Hickman, 1993 — New South Wales
- Lomanella thereseae G. S. Hunt & J. L. Hickman, 1993 — Tasmania
- Lomanella troglodytes G. S. Hunt & J. L. Hickman, 1993 — Tasmania
- Lomanella troglophilia G. S. Hunt & J. L. Hickman, 1993 — Tasmania

- Mensamontia Lawrence, 1931

- Mensamontia melanophora Lawrence, 1931 — South Africa
- Mensamontia morulifera Lawrence, 1931 — South Africa

- Metanuncia Roewer, 1914

- Metanuncia stewartia (Hogg, 1910) — Stewart Island, New Zealand

- Micromontia Lawrence, 1939

- Micromontia flava Lawrence, 1939 — South Africa

- Millomontia Lawrence, 1959

- Millomontia brevispina Lawrence, 1959
- Millomontia vadoni Lawrence, 1959

- Millotonyx Lawrence, 1959

- Millotonyx tenuipes Lawrence, 1959

- Monomontia Lawrence, 1931

- Monomontia aquilonaris Lawrence, 1963
- Monomontia aspera Lawrence, 1939 — South Africa
- Monomontia atra Lawrence, 1931 — South Africa
- Monomontia brincki Kauri, 1961
- Monomontia corticola Lawrence, 1938 — South Africa
- Monomontia cristiceps Lawrence, 1963
- Monomontia curvirostris Lawrence, 1938 — South Africa
- Monomontia flava Lawrence, 1933 — South Africa
- Monomontia granifrons Lawrence, 1938 — South Africa
- Monomontia intermedia Lawrence, 1938 — South Africa
- Monomontia krausi Kauri, 1961
- Monomontia lawrencei Kauri, 1950
- Monomontia montensis Lawrence, 1938 — South Africa
- Monomontia rattrayi Lawrence, 1931 — South Africa
- Monomontia rugosa Lawrence, 1937 — Natal
- Monomontia transvaalica Lawrence, 1963
- Monomontia versicolor Lawrence, 1963

- Nahuelonyx E. A. Maury, 1988

- Nahuelonyx nasutus (Ringuelet, 1959)

- Neonuncia Roewer, 1914

- Neonuncia blacki Forster, 1954
- Neonuncia campbelli Forster, 1954
- Neonuncia eastoni Forster, 1954
- Neonuncia enderbei (Hogg, 1910)
- Neonuncia opaca (Roewer, 1931) — New Zealand

- Notonuncia Hickman, 1958

- Notonuncia arvensis Hickman, 1958
- Notonuncia diversa Hickman, 1958
- Notonuncia obscura Hickman, 1958

- Nucina Hickman, 1958

- Nucina dispar Hickman, 1958
- Nucina silvestris Hickman, 1958

- Nuncia Loman, 1902

- Nuncia americana Roewer, 1961
- Nuncia arcuata Forster, 1954

- Nuncia arcuata arcuata Forster, 1954
- Nuncia arcuata aorangiensis Forster, 1954

- Nuncia sperata Loman, 1902 — New Zealand
- Nuncia chilensis (H. Soares, 1968) — Chile, Argentina
- Nuncia conjuncta Forster, 1954

- Nuncia conjuncta conjuncta Forster, 1954
- Nuncia conjuncta magnopercula Forster, 1954
- Nuncia conjuncta fiordensis Forster, 1954

- Nuncia constantia Forster, 1954
- Nuncia dentifera Forster, 1954
- Nuncia fatula Forster, 1954
- Nuncia grandis Forster, 1954
- Nuncia heteromorpha Forster, 1954

- Nuncia heteromorpha heteromorpha Forster, 1954
- Nuncia heteromorpha prolobula Forster, 1954

- Nuncia inopinata Forster, 1954
- Nuncia insulana Roewer, 1942
- Nuncia kershawi Forster, 1965
- Nuncia marchanti Forster, 1965
- Nuncia obesa Forster, 1954

- Nuncia obesa obesa Forster, 1954
- Nuncia obesa grimmetti Forster, 1954
- Nuncia obesa magna Forster, 1954
- Nuncia obesa rotunda Forster, 1954

- Nuncia oconnori Forster, 1954

- Nuncia oconnori oconnori Forster, 1954
- Nuncia oconnori conocula Forster, 1954
- Nuncia oconnori kopua Forster, 1954

- Nuncia ovata Roewer, 1914 — New Zealand
- Nuncia paucispinosa Forster, 1954
- Nuncia rostrata E. A. Maury, 1990 — Chile
- Nuncia spinulosa E. A. Maury, 1990 — Argentina
- Nuncia stabilis Forster, 1954
- Nuncia sulcata Forster, 1954
- Nuncia tamula Forster, 1954
- Nuncia tapanuiensis Forster, 1954
- Nuncia townsendi Forster, 1965
- Nuncia unifalculata Hickman, 1940
- Nuncia verrucosa E. A. Maury, 1990 — Chile, Argentina
- Nuncia vidua Forster, 1954
- Nuncia nigriflava (Loman, 1902)

- Nuncia nigriflava nigriflava (Loman, 1902)
- Nuncia nigriflava parvocula Forster, 1954
- Nuncia nigriflava parva
- Nuncia nigriflava smithi

- Nuncia elongata Forster, 1954
- Nuncia frustrata Forster, 1954
- Nuncia levis Forster, 1954
- Nuncia pallida Forster, 1954
- Nuncia planocula Forster, 1954
- Nuncia stewartia
- Nuncia sublaevis (Pocock, 1903) — New Zealand
- Nuncia variegata
- Nuncia tumidarta Forster, 1954
- Nuncia roeweri Forster, 1954
- Nuncia alpha Forster, 1954
- Nuncia contrita Forster, 1954

- Nunciella Roewer, 1929

- Nunciella aspersa (Pocock, 1903) — Australia
- Nunciella badia (Hickman, 1958)
- Nunciella cheliplus Roewer, 1931 — Australia
- Nunciella dentata (Hickman, 1958)
- Nunciella granulata Roewer, 1931 — New Zealand
- Nunciella kangarooensis Hunt, 1971
- Nunciella karriensis Kauri, 1954
- Nunciella montana Forster, 1955
- Nunciella parvula Roewer, 1931 — Australia
- Nunciella tasmaniensis Hickman, 1958
- Nunciella tuberculata Forster, 1949 — Victoria
- Nunciella woolcocki Forster, 1955

- Nuncioides Hickman, 1958

- Nuncioides dysmicus Hickman, 1958
- Nuncioides infrequens Hickman, 1958

- Odontonuncia Hickman, 1958

- Odontonuncia saltuensis Hickman, 1958

- Paramontia Lawrence, 1934

- Paramontia infinita Lawrence, 1934
- Paramontia lisposoma (Lawrence, 1931) — South Africa

- Paranuncia Roewer, 1914

- Paranuncia gigantea Roewer, 1914 — Tasmania
- Paranuncia ingens Roewer, 1931 — Australia

- Parattahia Roewer, 1914

- Parattahia usignata Roewer, 1914 — Tasmania

- Paulianyx Lawrence, 1959

- Paulianyx brevipes Lawrence, 1959
- Paulianyx ferruginea Lawrence, 1959

- Perthacantha Roewer, 1931

- Perthacantha jugata Roewer, 1931 — Australia

- Planimontia Kauri, 1961

- Planimontia goodnightorum Kauri, 1961

- Prasma Roewer, 1931

- Prasma crassipalpus (Roewer, 1931) — New Zealand
- Prasma sorenseni Forster, 1954
- Prasma tuberculata (Hogg, 1920) — New Zealand

- Prasmiola Forster, 1954

- Prasmiola unica Forster, 1954

- Promecostethus Enderlein, 1909

- Promecostethus unifalculatus Enderlein, 1909 — Crozet Island, Procession Island

- Psalenoba Roewer, 1931

- Psalenoba nunciaeformis Roewer, 1931 — New Zealand

- Rhynchobunus Hickman, 1958

- Rhynchobunus arrogans Hickman, 1958

- Roewerania Lawrence, 1934

- Roewerania guduana Kauri, 1961
- Roewerania lignicola Lawrence, 1934 — South Africa
- Roewerania montana Kauri, 1961
- Roewerania spinosa Lawrence, 1938 — South Africa

- Rostromontia Lawrence, 1931

- Rostromontia capensis Lawrence, 1931 — South Africa
- Rostromontia granulifera Lawrence, 1931 — South Africa
- Rostromontia truncata Lawrence, 1931 — South Africa

- Speleomontia Lawrence, 1931

- Speleomontia cavernicola Lawrence, 1931 — South Africa

- Stylonuncia Hickman, 1958

- Stylonuncia spinosa Hickman, 1958

- Tasmanonyx Hickman, 1958

- Tasmanonyx montanus Hickman, 1958

- Triaenomontia Roewer, 1914

- Triaenomontia hispida Roewer, 1914 — Madagascar
- Triaenomontia horrida Roewer, 1914 — Madagascar
- Triaenomontia nigra (Lawrence, 1959)

- Triaenonychoides H. Soares, 1968

- Triaenonychoides cekalovici H. Soares, 1968 — Chile
- Triaenonychoides breviops E. A. Maury, 1987 — Chile

- Triaenonyx Sørensen, in L. Koch 1886

- Triaenonyx arrogans H. Soares, 1968 — Chile
- Triaenonyx chilensis Sørensen, 1902 — Chile
- Triaenonyx corralensis Roewer, 1915 — Chile
- Triaenonyx dispersus Roewer, 1915 — Chile
- Triaenonyx parva Phillips & Grimmett, 1932 — New Zealand
- Triaenonyx rapax Sørensen, in L. Koch 1886 — Chile
- Triaenonyx valdiviensis Sørensen, 1902 — Chile, Argentina

- Triconobunus Roewer, 1914

- Triconobunus horridus Roewer, 1914 — New Caledonia

- Triregia Forster, 1948

- Triregia bilineata (Forster 1954) — New Zealand (for Adaeum bilineatum)
- Triregia fairburni (Forster 1954) — New Zealand (for Adaeum fairburni)
- Triregia monstrosa Forster, 1948 — New Zealand

- Valdivionyx E. A. Maury, 1988

- Valdivionyx crassipes E. A. Maury, 1988 — Chile, Argentina

- Yatala Roewer, 1942

- Yatala hirsti Roewer, 1942 — South Australia

- Conoculus Forster, 1949

- Conoculus asperus Forster, 1949 — Australia

- Yulella Lawrence, 1939

- Yulella natalensis (Lawrence, 1937) — Natal

- Picunchenops E. A. Maury, 1988

- Picunchenops spelaeus E. A. Maury, 1988 — cave, Argentina

- Pyenganella Hickman, 1958

- Pyenganella striata Hickman, 1958

- Tasmanonuncia Hickman, 1958

- Tasmanonuncia segnis Hickman, 1958

- Thelbunus Hickman, 1958

- Thelbunus mirabilis Hickman, 1958

- Triaenobunus Sørensen, in L. Koch 1886

- Triaenobunus bicarinatus Sørensen, in L. Koch 1886 — Australia
- Triaenobunus armstrongi Forster, 1955
- Triaenobunus asper Hickman, 1958
- Triaenobunus cornutus Hickman, 1958
- Triaenobunus groomi Forster, 1955
- Triaenobunus hamiltoni Phillips & Grimmett, 1932 — New Zealand
- Triaenobunus inornatus Hickman, 1958
- Triaenobunus mestoni Hickman, 1958
- Triaenobunus minutus Forster, 1955
- Triaenobunus montanus Hickman, 1958
- Triaenobunus pescotti Forster, 1955
- Triaenobunus pilosus Hickman, 1958
- Triaenobunus woodwardi Forster, 1955
- Triaenobunus pectinatus Pocock, 1903 — Tasmania

- Algidia Hogg, 1920

- Algidia akaroa Roewer, 1931 — New Zealand
- Algidia chiltoni Roewer, 1931 — New Zealand (= syn. Adaeum hoggi Forster, 1943 in some schemes as Algidia hoggi)
- Algidia homerica Forster, 1954
- Algidia interrupta Forster, 1954
- Algidia marplesi Forster, 1954
- Algidia nigriflavum
- Algidia viridata Forster, 1954

- Allobunus Hickman, 1958

- Allobunus distinctus Hickman, 1958

- Americobunus Muñoz-Cuevas, 1972

- Americobunus ringueleti Muñoz-Cuevas, 1972

- Araucanobunus Muñoz-Cuevas, 1973

- Araucanobunus juberthiei Munoz-Cuevas, 1973

- Cenefia Roewer, 1931

- Cenefia adaeiformis Roewer, 1931 — New Zealand
- Cenefia delli Forster, 1954
- Cenefia sorenseni Forster, 1954
- Cenefia westlandica Forster, 1954

- Chilobunus Hickman, 1958

- Chilobunus spinosus Hickman, 1958

- Chrestobunus Roewer, 1914

- Chrestobunus fuscus Hickman, 1958
- Chrestobunus inermis Roewer, 1914 — Tasmania
- Chrestobunus spinulatus Roewer, 1914 — Tasmania

- Dipristes Roewer, 1931

- Dipristes serripus Roewer, 1931 — Australia

- Eubunus Hickman, 1958

- Eubunus crypsidomus Hickman, 1958

- Glyptobunus Roewer, 1914

- Glyptobunus ornatus Hickman, 1958
- Glyptobunus signatus Roewer, 1914 — Tasmania

- Mestonia Hickman, 1958

- Mestonia acris Hickman, 1958
- Mestonia picra Hickman, 1958

- Miobunus Roewer, 1915

- Miobunus thoracicus Roewer, 1915 — Tasmania
- Miobunus forficula Hunt, 1995 — Tasmania
- Miobunus mainae Hunt, 1995 — Tasmania
- Miobunus johnhickmani Hunt, 1995 — Tasmania
- Miobunus levis Hickman, 1958 [placement?
- Miobunus parvus (Hickman, 1958) [placement?

- Muscicola Forster, 1954

- Muscicola picta Forster, 1954

- Phanerobunus Roewer, 1915

- Phanerobunus armatus Roewer, 1915 — Tasmania
- Phanerobunus asperrimus Hickman, 1958
- Phanerobunus hebes Hickman, 1958
- Phanerobunus saxatilis Hickman, 1958

- Phoxobunus Hickman, 1958

- Phoxobunus rostratus Hickman, 1958
- Phoxobunus tuberculatus Hickman, 1958

- Pristobunus Roewer, 1931

- Pristobunus hilus Forster, 1954
- Pristobunus acuminatus (Hogg, 1920) — New Zealand

== Kaolinonychinae ==
Kaolinonychinae Suzuki, 1975

- Kaolinonychus Suzuki, 1975

- Kaolinonychus coreanus (Suzuki, 1966)

- Kaolinonychus coreanus coreanus Suzuki, 1966
- Kaolinonychus coreanus longipes Suzuki, 1966

- Mutsunonychus Suzuki, 1976

- Mutsunonychus fuscus Suzuki, 1976

== Nippononychinae ==
Nippononychinae Suzuki, 1975

- Nippononychus Suzuki, 1975

- Nippononychus japonica (Miyosi, 1957)

- Metanippononychus Suzuki, 1975

- Metanippononychus tomishimai Suzuki, 1975

- Metanippononychus tomishimai tomishimai Suzuki, 1975
- Metanippononychus tomishimai awanus Suzuki, 1975

- Metanippononychus daisenensis Suzuki, 1975
- Metanippononychus iriei Suzuki, 1975

- Metanippononychus iriei iriei Suzuki, 1975
- Metanippononychus iriei yakuensis Suzuki, 1975

- Metanippononychus iyanus Suzuki, 1975

- Izunonychus Suzuki, 1975

- Izunonychus ohruii Suzuki, 1975

== Paranonychinae ==
Paranonychinae Briggs, 1971

- Kainonychus Suzuki, 1975

- Kainonychus akamai (Suzuki, 1972)

- Kainonychus akamai akamai Suzuki, 1972 — Japan
- Kainonychus akamai esoensis Suzuki, 1975 — Japan

- Metanonychus Briggs, 1971

- Metanonychus idahoensis Briggs, 1971 — USA: Idaho
- Metanonychus navarrus Briggs, 1971 — USA: California (later Oregon)
- Metanonychus nigricans Briggs, 1971 — USA: California

- Metanonychus nigricans nigricans Briggs, 1971 — USA: Idaho
- Metanonychus nigricans oregonus Briggs, 1971 — USA: Oregon

- Metanonychus setulus Briggs, 1971

- Metanonychus setulus setulus Briggs, 1971 — USA: Oregon
- Metanonychus setulus mazamus Briggs, 1971 — USA: Oregon

[for Metanonychus setulus navarrus see Metanonychus navarrus]

- Metanonychus setulus obrieni Briggs, 1971 — USA: California
- Metanonychus setulus cascadus Briggs, 1971 — USA: Oregon

- Paranonychus Briggs, 1971

- Paranonychus brunneus (Banks, 1893) — USA: Washington
- Paranonychus concolor Briggs, 1971 — USA: Oregon
- Paranonychus fuscus (Suzuki, 1976) — Japan

== Sclerobuninae ==
Sclerobuninae Dumitrescu, 1976

- Cyptobunus Banks, 1905

- Cyptobunus cavicolens Banks, 1905 — Montana
- Cyptobunus ungulatus Briggs, 1971

- Cyptobunus ungulatus ungulatus Briggs, 1971 — Nevada
- Cyptobunus ungulatus madhousensis Briggs, 1971 — Utah

- Sclerobunus Banks, 1893

- Sclerobunus nondimorphicus Briggs, 1971 — Washington
- Sclerobunus parvus Roewer, 1931 — Canada
- Sclerobunus robustus (Packard, 1877)

- Sclerobunus robustus robustus (Packard, 1877) — western U.S.
- Sclerobunus robustus idahoensis (Briggs, 1971) — Idaho
- Sclerobunus robustus glorietus (Briggs, 1971) — New Mexico

- Zuma Goodnight & Goodnight, 1942

- Zuma acuta Goodnight & Goodnight, 1942 — California
- Zuma tioga Briggs, 1971 — California

== Sorensenellinae ==
Sorensenellinae Forster, 1954

- Karamea Forster, 1954

- Karamea lobata Forster, 1954 — New Zealand

- Karamea lobata aurea Forster, 1954
- Karamea lobata australis Forster, 1954
- Karamea lobata lobata Forster, 1954

- Karamea trailli (Hogg, 1920) — New Zealand
- Karamea tricerata Forster, 1954 — New Zealand
- Karamea tuthilli Forster, 1954 — New Zealand

- Lawrencella Strand, 1932

- Lawrencella inermis (Lawrence, 1931) — South Africa (Western Cape)

- Sorensenella Pocock, 1903

- Sorensenella bicornis Pocock, 1903 — New Zealand (inc. unavailable name "Sorensenella formosana" which refers to junior synonym of Akaroa formosa Roewer 1931).

- Sorensenella bicornis bicornis Pocock, 1903
- Sorensenella bicornis parva Forster, 1954
- Sorensenella bicornis waikanae Forster, 1954

- Sorensenella prehensor Pocock, 1903 — New Zealand

- Sorensenella prehensor nitida Forster, 1954
- Sorensenella prehensor obesa Forster, 1954
- Sorensenella prehensor prehensor Pocock, 1903

- Sorensenella rotara Phillips & Grimmett, 1932 — New Zealand

- Speleomontia Lawrence, 1931

- Speleomontia cavernicola Lawrence, 1931 — South Africa (Western Cape)
