= List of Paranonychidae species =

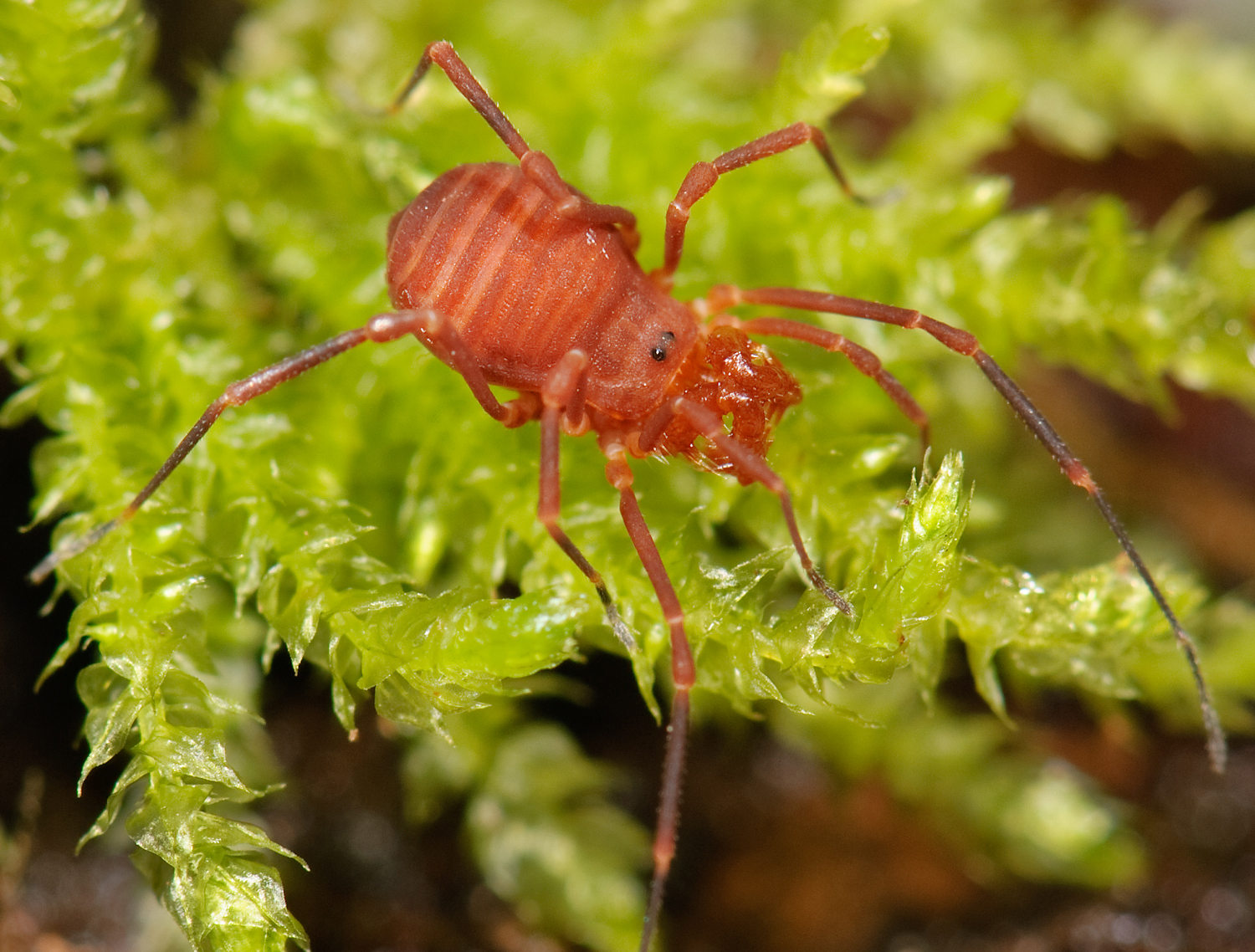
Sclerobunus nondimorphicus, a species in the Paranonychidae family

Paranonychidae is a family of armoured harvestmen in the order Opiliones. There are 9 genera and at least 28 described species in Paranonychidae. The data is from the World Catalogue of Opiliones (WCO).

== Paranonychidae ==
- Izunonychus Suzuki, 1975 (Previously in Triaenonychidae: Nippononychinae)

- Izunonychus ohruii Suzuki, 1975 – Japan

- Kainonychus Suzuki, 1975 (Previously in Triaenonychidae: Paranonychinae)

- Kainonychus akamai (Suzuki, 1972)

- Kainonychus akamai akamai Suzuki, 1972 – Japan
- Kainonychus akamai esoensis Suzuki, 1975 – Japan

- Kaolinonychus Suzuki, 1975 (Previously in Triaenonychidae: Kaolinonychinae)

- Kaolinonychus coreanus (Suzuki, 1966)

- Kaolinonychus coreanus coreanus Suzuki, 1966 – South Korea
- Kaolinonychus coreanus longipes Suzuki, 1966 – South Korea

- Metanippononychus Suzuki, 1975 (Previously in Triaenonychidae: Nippononychinae)

- Metanippononychus daisenensis Suzuki, 1975 – Japan
- Metanippononychus iriei Suzuki, 1975

- Metanippononychus iriei iriei Suzuki, 1975 – Japan
- Metanippononychus iriei yakuensis Suzuki, 1975 – Japan

- Metanippononychus iyanus Suzuki, 1975 – Japan
- Metanippononychus tomishimai Suzuki, 1975

- Metanippononychus tomishimai awanus Suzuki, 1975 – Japan
- Metanippononychus tomishimai tomishimai Suzuki, 1975 – Japan

- Metanonychus Briggs, 1971 (Previously in Triaenonychidae: Paranonychinae)

- Metanonychus cascadus Briggs, 1971 – USA: Oregon
- Metanonychus idahoensis Briggs, 1971 – USA: Idaho
- Metanonychus mazamus Briggs, 1971 – USA: Oregon
- Metanonychus mechanicus Derkarabetian and Hedin, 2019 – USA: Oregon, Washington
- Metanonychus navarrus Briggs, 1971 – USA: California.
- Metanonychus nigricans Briggs, 1971 – USA: California
- Metanonychus setulus Briggs, 1971 – USA: Oregon

- Nippononychus Suzuki, 1975 (Previously in Triaenonychidae: Nippononychinae)

- Nippononychus japonica (Miyosi, 1957)

- Paranonychus Briggs, 1971 (Previously in Triaenonychidae: Paranonychinae)

- Paranonychus brunneus (Banks, 1893) – USA: Oregon, Washington, Alaska, Canada: British Columbia
- Paranonychus concolor Briggs, 1971 – USA: Oregon
- Paranonychus fuscus (Suzuki, 1976) – Japan

- Sclerobunus Banks, 1893 (Previously in Triaenonychidae: Sclerobuninae)(inc. Cyptobunus Banks, 1905)

- Sclerobunus cavicolus (Banks, 1905) – USA: Montana (was with misspelling as Cyptobunus cavicolens)
- Sclerobunus glorietus (Briggs, 1971) – USA: New Mexico (from protonym Scotolemon robustus glorietus)
- Sclerobunus idahoensis (Briggs, 1971) – USA: Idaho and Montana
- Sclerobunus jemez Derkarabetian & Hedin, 2014 – USA: New Mexico
- Sclerobunus klomax Derkarabetian & Hedin, 2014 – USA: New Mexico
- Sclerobunus madhousensis (Briggs, 1971) – USA: Utah
- Sclerobunus nondimorphicus Briggs, 1971 – USA: Oregon, Washington, and British Columbia
- Sclerobunus robustus (Packard, 1877) – USA: Arizona, Colorado, New Mexico, and Utah
- Sclerobunus skywalkeri Derkarabetian & Hedin, 2014 – USA: New Mexico
- Sclerobunus speoventus Derkarabetian & Hedin, 2014 – USA: Colorado
- Sclerobunus steinmanni Derkarabetian & Hedin, 2014 – USA: Colorado
- Sclerobunus ungulatus Briggs, 1971 – USA: Nevada

- Zuma Goodnight & Goodnight, 1942 (Previously in Triaenonychidae: Sclerobuninae)

- Zuma acuta Goodnight & Goodnight, 1942 – USA: California
- Zuma tioga Briggs, 1971 – USA: California
