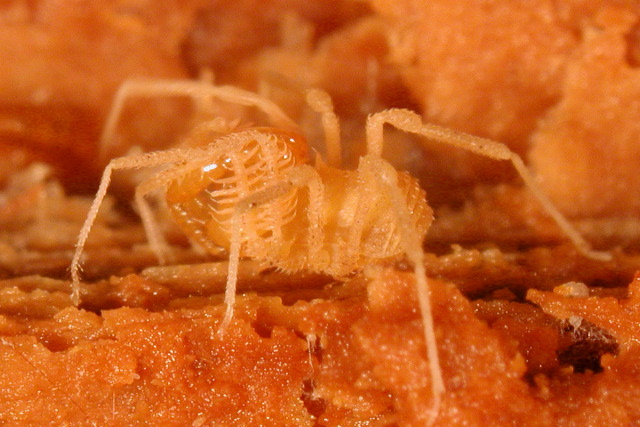
- Fumontana deprehendor

Scientific classification
- Kingdom: Animalia
- Phylum: Arthropoda
- Subphylum: Chelicerata
- Class: Arachnida
- Order: Opiliones
- Superfamily: Triaenonychioidea
- Family: Triaenonychidae; Sørensen in L. Koch, 1886

Subfamilies
- Triaenonychinae; Kaolinonychinae; Nippononychinae; Paranonychinae; Sclerobuninae; Soerensenellinae

Diversity
- c. 120 genera, > 440 species

= Triaenonychidae =

Family of harvestmen/daddy longlegs

Triaenonychidae is a family of harvestmen with about 120 genera and more than 440 described species.

== Description ==
Most species of the family Triaenonychidae are from three to five millimeters long, although some species from South Africa can be only 1 millimetre (0.039 in) long. Some species in the subfamily Adaeinae are almost 10 mm (0.39 in) long. Legs are almost always short, measuring 4–12 mm (0.16–0.47 in). The armed pedipalps are large, and much stronger than the legs.

== Distribution ==
Triaenonychidae are found in North and South America, Japan and Korea, Australia and New Zealand, and Madagascar.

== Relationships ==
The Triaenonychidae should probably split into at least two families. The genera from the Australian region are considered Triaenonychidae sensu stricto, and may include the strange Synthetonychiidae; the northern species should be grouped with Travuniidae.

== Name ==
The name of the type genus Triaenonyx is combined from Ancient Greek τρίαινα (triaina, "trident, fish spear") and ὄνυξ (onyx, "claw").

== Genera ==
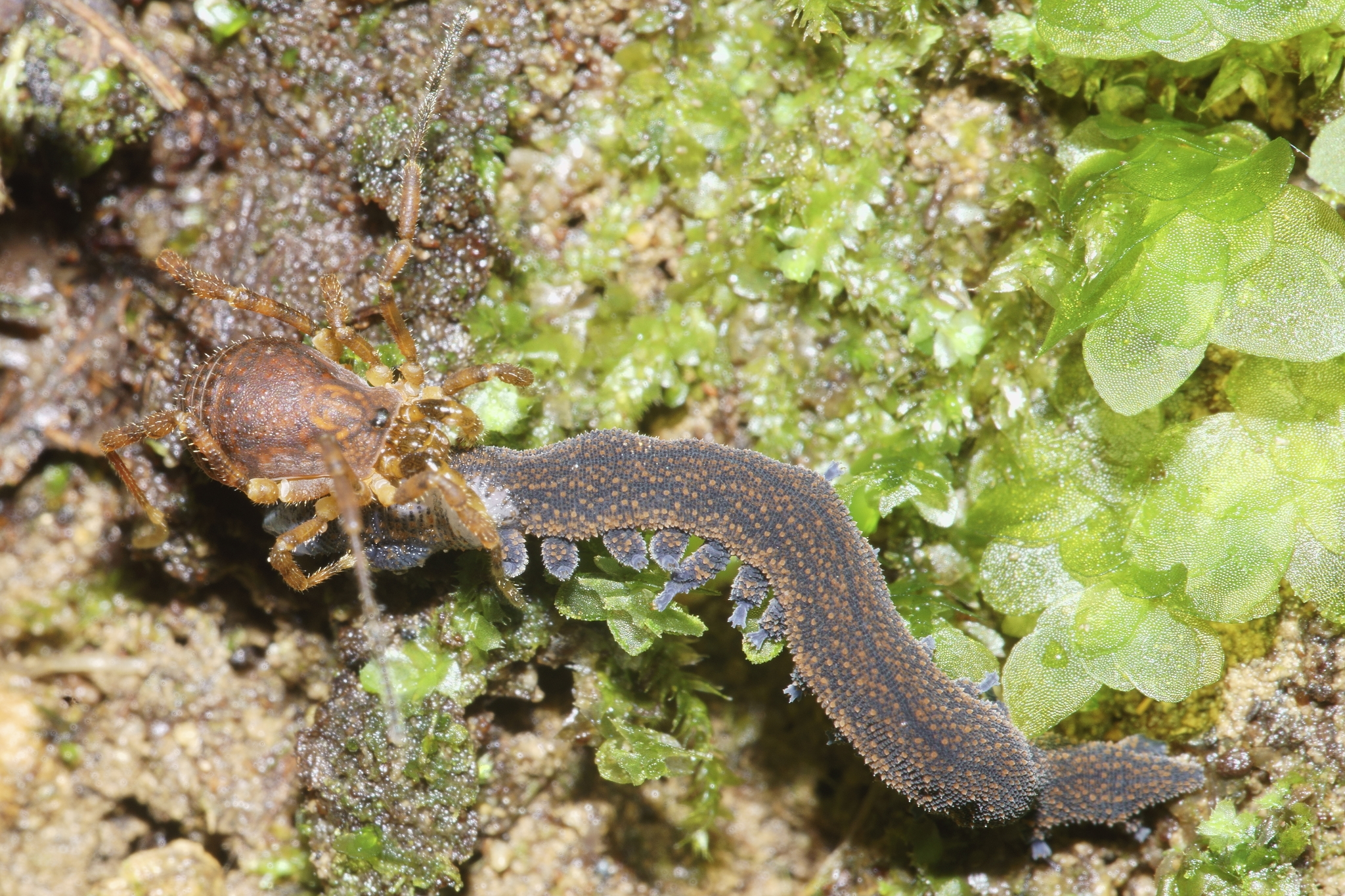
Nuncia conjuncta feeding on Peripatoides novaezealandiae

The following genera are included in the family:

Triaenonychinae Sørensen in L. Koch, 1886

- Adaeinae Pocock, 1902 (in some schemes many of these same genera as Adaeini Pocock, 1902, including Triregia)

- Adaeulum Roewer, 1915 (elsewhere as 1914)
- Adaeum Karsch, 1880
- Cryptadaeum Lawrence, 1931
- Dingupa Forster, 1952 (under Triaenobunini in Hallan listing)
- Heteradaeum Lawrence, 1963
- Larifuga Loman, 1898
- Larifugella Staręga, 1992 (contra Lawrence, 1933)
- Micradaeum Lawrence, 1931
- Montadaeum Lawrence, 1931
- Paradaeum Lawrence, 1931

- Triaenonychini Sørensen in L. Koch, 1886

- Acumontia Loman, 1898
- Allonuncia Hickman, 1958
- Amatola Lawrence, 1931
- Ankaratrix Lawrence, 1959
- Ankylonuncia Hickman, 1958
- Antongila Roewer, 1931
- Austromontia Lawrence, 1931
- Austronuncia Lawrence, 1931
- Bezavonia Roewer, 1949
- Biacumontia Lawrence, 1931
- Brasiloctis Mello-Leitão, 1938
- Breviacantha Kauri, 1954
- Bryonuncia Hickman, 1958
- Callihamina Roewer, 1942
- Callihamus Roewer, 1931
- Calliuncus Roewer, 1931
- Ceratomontia Roewer, 1915
- Cluniella Forster, 1955
- Conoculus Forster, 1949
- Decarynella Fage, 1945
- Diaenobunus Roewer, 1914
- Diasia Sørensen, 1902
- Equitius Simon, 1880
- Graemontia Lawrence, 1931
- Gunvoria Kauri, 1961
- Hedwiga Roewer, 1931
- Hendea Roewer, 1931
- Hendeola Forster, 1954
- Heteronuncia Roewer, 1920
- Hickmanoxyomma G. S. Hunt, 1990
- Holonuncia Forster, 1955
- Hovanuncia Lawrence, 1959
- Ivohibea Lawrence, 1959
- Lawrencella Strand, 1932
- Leionuncia Hickman, 1958
- Lispomontia Lawrence, 1937
- Lizamontia Kury, 2004 South Africa
- Lomanella Pocock, 1903
- Mensamontia Lawrence, 1931
- Metanuncia Roewer, 1914
- Micromontia Lawrence, 1939
- Millomontia Lawrence, 1959
- Millotonyx Lawrence, 1959
- Monomontia Lawrence, 1931
- Nahuelonyx E. A. Maury, 1988
- Neonuncia Roewer, 1914
- Notonuncia Hickman, 1958
- Nucina Hickman, 1958
- Nuncia Loman, 1902
- Nunciella Roewer, 1929
- Nuncioides Hickman, 1958
- Odontonuncia Hickman, 1958
- Paramontia Lawrence, 1934
- Paranuncia Roewer, 1914
- Parattahia Roewer, 1914
- Paulianyx Lawrence, 1959
- Perthacantha Roewer, 1931
- Planimontia Kauri, 1961
- Prasma Roewer, 1931
- Prasmiola Forster, 1954
- Promecostethus Enderlein, 1909
- Psalenoba Roewer, 1931
- Rhynchobunus Hickman, 1958
- Roewerania Lawrence, 1934
- Rostromontia Lawrence, 1931
- Speleomontia Lawrence, 1931
- Stylonuncia Hickman, 1958
- Tasmanonyx Hickman, 1958
- Triaenomontia Roewer, 1914
- Triaenonychoides H. Soares, 1968
- Triaenonyx Sørensen in L. Koch, 1886
- Triconobunus Roewer, 1914
- Triregia Forster, 1948 (see Adaeinae for former alternative placement).
- Valdivionyx Maury, 1988
- Yatala Roewer, 1942
- Yulella Lawrence, 1939

- Triaenobunini Pocock, 1902

- Pyenganella Hickman, 1958
- Tasmanonuncia Hickman, 1958
- Thelbunus Hickman, 1958
- Triaenobunus Sørensen in L. Koch, 1886
- Algidia Hogg, 1920
- Allobunus Hickman, 1958
- Americobunus Muñoz-Cuevas, 1972
- Araucanobunus Muñoz-Cuevas, 1973
- Cenefia Roewer, 1931
- Chilobunus Hickman, 1958
- Chrestobunus Roewer, 1914
- Dipristes Roewer, 1931
- Eubunus Hickman, 1958
- Glyptobunus Roewer, 1914
- Mestonia Hickman, 1958
- Miobunus Roewer, 1915
- Muscicola Forster, 1954
- Phanerobunus Roewer, 1915
- Phoxobunus Hickman, 1958
- Pristobunus Roewer, 1931

- incertae sedis

- Fumontana Shear, 1977
- Picunchenops Maury, 1988

Kaolinonychinae Suzuki, 1975
- Kaolinonychus Suzuki, 1975
- Mutsunonychus Suzuki, 1976

Nippononychinae Suzuki, 1975
- Nippononychus Suzuki, 1975
- Metanippononychus Suzuki, 1975
- Izunonychus Suzuki, 1975

Paranonychinae Briggs, 1971
- Kainonychus Suzuki, 1975
- Metanonychus Briggs, 1971
- Paranonychus Briggs, 1971

Sclerobuninae Dumitrescu, 1976
- Cyptobunus Banks, 1905
- Sclerobunus Banks, 1893
- Zuma Goodnight & Goodnight, 1942

Sorensenellinae Forster, 1954
- Karamea Forster, 1954
- Sorensenella Pocock, 1903
