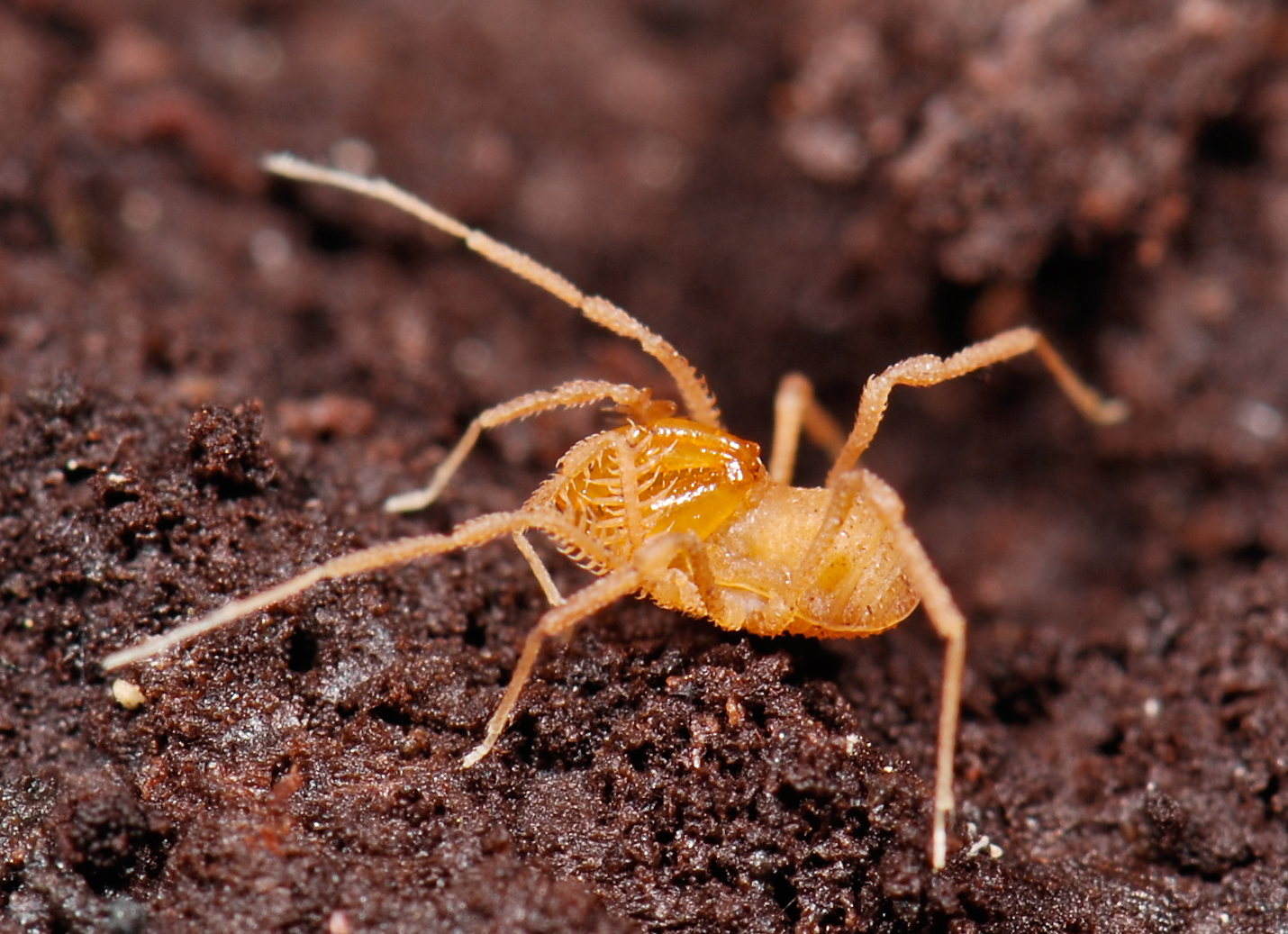
- Fumontana deprehendor from North Carolina

Scientific classification
- Domain: Eukaryota
- Kingdom: Animalia
- Phylum: Arthropoda
- Subphylum: Chelicerata
- Class: Arachnida
- Order: Opiliones
- Infraorder: Insidiatores
- Superfamily: Triaenonychoidea
- Family: Buemarinoidae
- Genus: Fumontana; Shear, 1977

Type species
- Fumontana deprehendor Shear, 1977

Species
- See text

Diversity
- 1 species

= Fumontana =

Genus of harvestmen/daddy longlegs

Fumontana is a monotypic genus of harvestman that occurs in the United States (North Carolina and Tennessee) with one described species, F. deprehendor.

== Biogeography ==
While members of the allied family Triaenonychidae are rather widespread globally, and well represented in Western North America, F. deprehendor is more recently considered part of the much smaller relict family Buemarinoidae Karaman, 2019, being the only species of this lineage found in the a few locations in the Eastern United States. The Appalachian millipede genus Choctella shows a similar distribution, suggesting they both stem from the same Gondwanan fauna.

Certain aspects of its anatomy (such as position and form of the eye tubercle, and the male genitalia) make it likely that it is most closely related to genera in other parts of the world, such as Monomontia in South Africa or Hendea in New Zealand. F. deprehendor is thus likely an ancient relict, suggesting a wide distribution of the family before the current distribution of continents.

== Habitat ==
It was first discovered in forest litter of Greenbrier Cove, Great Smoky Mountains National Park, Tennessee. Another specimen was recorded near Robbinsville, Graham County, North Carolina, under a stone in a virgin cove hardwoods forest, 55 km (34 mi) southeast of the first find. About 30 years later, 22 new populations were found in the region, including habitats in southwestern Virginia, eastern Tennessee, western North Carolina, and northern Georgia. The majority was found in heights above 750 m (2,460 ft), and they were most abundant in well decayed hemlock logs.

== Name ==
The genus name is derived from the Latin words for "smoke" and "mountain". The species name is Latin for "one who takes by surprise".
