= Psalenoba =

Scientific classification
- Kingdom: Animalia
- Phylum: Arthropoda
- Subphylum: Chelicerata
- Class: Arachnida
- Order: Opiliones
- Family: Triaenonychidae
- Genus: Psalenoba; Roewer, 1931
- Species: P. nunciaeformis

Binomial name
- Psalenoba nunciaeformis Roewer, 1931

Genus of harvestmen

Psalenoba, is a monotypic genus of harvestmen in the family Triaenonychidae. The genus contains a single species, Psalenoba nunciaeformis. They are endemic to New Zealand.

== Description ==
The genus Psalenoba differs markedly from others the structure of the male pedipalp and first legs.

== Etymology ==
Caution should be taken with the misspelling of the species epithet as "nunciaeformes" found in some databases (e.g.). This does not reflect the original spelling, nor can it be a justified emendation.

The origin of the species epithet "nunciaeformis" is not explained in the original description, but it can be formed from modification of the existing genus Nuncia Loman, 1902, plus a perhaps malformed joining -e- before an adjectival suffix in nominative singular -formis. Several other related genera also have names derived from Nuncia Loman, 1902, such as Allonuncia Hickman, 1958, Austronuncia Lawrence, 1931, Bryonuncia Hickman, 1958.
