= Arbasus =

Scientific classification
- Kingdom: Animalia
- Phylum: Arthropoda
- Subphylum: Chelicerata
- Class: Arachnida
- Order: Opiliones
- Suborder: Laniatores
- Infraorder: Insidiatores
- Superfamily: Triaenonychoidea
- Family: Buemarinoidae
- Genus: Arbasus; Roewer, 1935
- Species: A. caecus

Binomial name
- Arbasus caecus (Simon, 1911)

Genus of harvestmen/daddy longlegs

Arbasus is a monotypic genus of armoured harvestmen in the family Buemarinoidae with one described species (as of 2023) Arbasus caecus. It is found in the Pyrenees of southern France.

The genus was originally placed in the family Travuniidae, but later transferred to Cladonychiidae by Derkarabetian et al. 2018. It has been subsequently transferred to Buemarinoidae by Karaman (2023).

== Species ==
These species belong to the genus Arbasus:

- Arbasus caecus (Simon, 1911) – France
