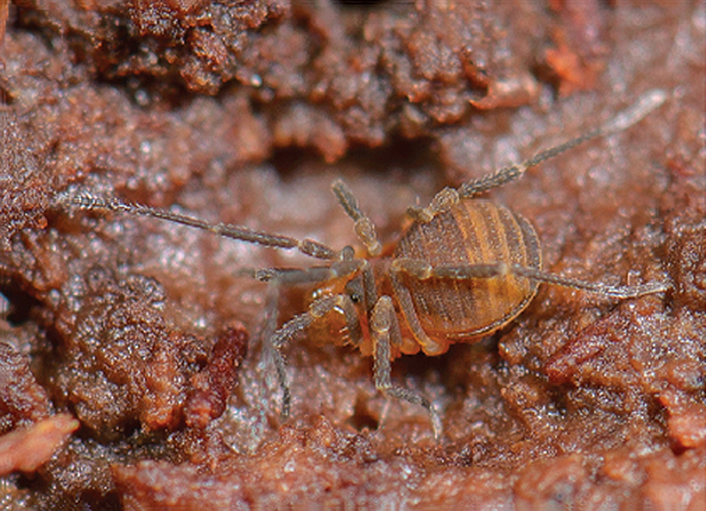

Scientific classification
- Kingdom: Animalia
- Phylum: Arthropoda
- Subphylum: Chelicerata
- Class: Arachnida
- Order: Opiliones
- Suborder: Laniatores
- Infraorder: Insidiatores
- Superfamily: Travunioidea
- Family: Paranonychidae
- Genus: Paranonychus
- Species: P. brunneus

Binomial name
- Paranonychus brunneus (Banks, 1893)

Synonyms
- Sclerobunus parvus Roewer, 1931

= Paranonychus brunneus =

Species of harvestman/daddy longlegs

Paranonychus brunneus is a species of armoured harvestman in the family Paranonychidae. It is found in eastern North America, ranging from Oregon through Washington, British Columbia, and Alaska.
