= Synthetonychiidae =

Scientific classification
- Domain: Eukaryota
- Kingdom: Animalia
- Phylum: Arthropoda
- Subphylum: Chelicerata
- Class: Arachnida
- Order: Opiliones
- Suborder: Laniatores
- Infraorder: Insidiatores
- Superfamily: Triaenonychoidea
- Family: Synthetonychiidae; Forster, 1954

Type genus
- Synthetonychia Forster, 1954

Diversity
- 1 genus, 14 species

Genus of harvestmen/daddy longlegs

The Synthetonychiidae are a small family of harvestman with a handful of species in a single genus. They are endemic to New Zealand.

== Description ==
Species in this family are between one and two millimeters long, with legs up to almost six mm.

== Distribution ==
All described species occur only on New Zealand.

== Relationships ==
Synthetonychiidae seem to be closely related to the Triaenonychidae from the Australian region.

== Name ==
The name of the type genus is combined from Ancient Greek synthetos "compounded" and onychion, the diminutive of onyx "claw".

== Species ==
In Synthetonychia Forster, 1954:

- Synthetonychia oliveae Forster, 1954
- Synthetonychia acuta Forster, 1954
- Synthetonychia cornua Forster, 1954
- Synthetonychia fiordensis Forster, 1954
- Synthetonychia glacialis Forster, 1954
- Synthetonychia florae Forster, 1954
- Synthetonychia hughsoni Forster, 1954
- Synthetonychia minuta Forster, 1954
- Synthetonychia obtusa Forster, 1954
- Synthetonychia oparara Forster, 1954
- Synthetonychia proxima Forster, 1954
- Synthetonychia ramosa Forster, 1954
- Synthetonychia sinuosa Forster, 1954
- Synthetonychia wairarapae Forster, 1954
