= Buemarinoidae =

Buemarinoidae Temporal range: Palaeogene–present

Scientific classification
- Domain: Eukaryota
- Kingdom: Animalia
- Phylum: Arthropoda
- Subphylum: Chelicerata
- Class: Arachnida
- Order: Opiliones
- Suborder: Laniatores
- Infraorder: Insidiatores
- Superfamily: Triaenonychoidea
- Family: Buemarinoidae; Karaman, 2019

Type genus
- Buemarinoa Roewer, 1956

Diversity
- 6 Genera

Superfamily of harvestmen/daddy longlegs

Buemarinoidae is a family of harvestmen with about 6 genera and only 6 described species. There are 4 families and more than 440 described species in Triaenonychoidea.

== Genera ==
The following genera are included in the family:

- Arbasus Roewer, 1935

- Arbasus caecus (Simon, 1911) – France

- Buemarinoa Roewer, 1956

- Buemarinoa patrizii Roewer, 1956 — Italy (Sardinia)

- Flavonuncia Lawrence 1959

- Flavonuncia pupilla Lawrence 1959 — Madagascar

- Fumontana Shear, 1977

- Fumontana deprehendor Shear, 1977 – USA: North Carolina, Tennessee

- Phocyx Porto, Monod & Pérez-González, 2024

- Phocyx australis Porto, Monod & Pérez-González, 2024 – Australia

- Turonychus Derkarabetian, Prieto & Giribet, 2021

- Turonychus fadriquei Derkarabetian, Prieto & Giribet, 2021 – Spain
