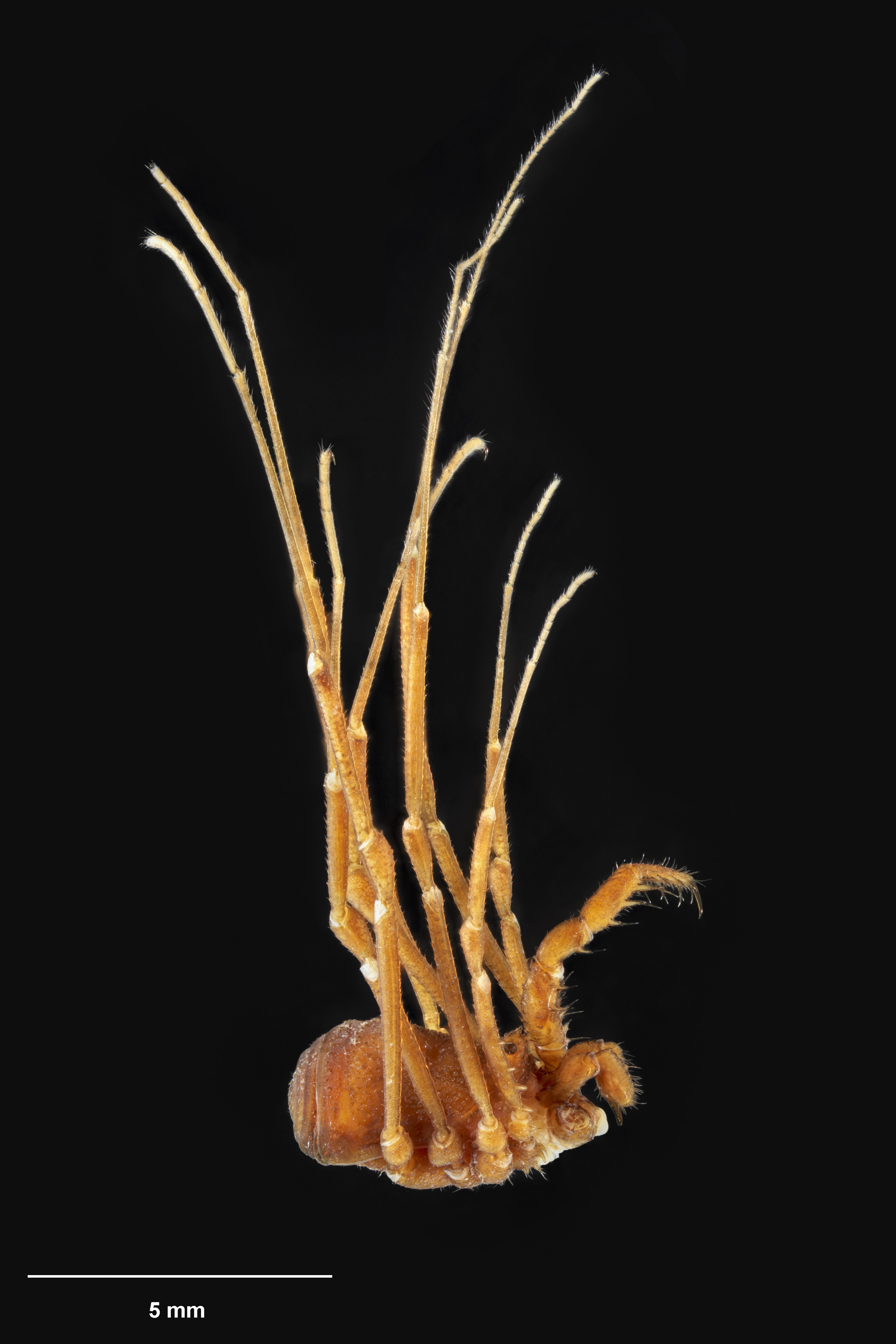
- Holotype female

Conservation status
- Nationally Critical (NZ TCS)

Scientific classification
- Kingdom: Animalia
- Phylum: Arthropoda
- Subphylum: Chelicerata
- Class: Arachnida
- Order: Opiliones
- Family: Triaenonychidae
- Subfamily: Triaenonychinae
- Genus: Prasmiola; Forster, 1954
- Species: P. unica

Binomial name
- Prasmiola unica Forster, 1954

= Prasmiola =

Species of arachnid

Prasmiola unica is the only member of the genus Prasmiola in the harvestman family Triaenonychidae. It is found near Wellington, New Zealand, and is known from a single specimen. The New Zealand Threat Classification System status for this species is 'nationally critical'.

== Taxonomy ==
Prasmiola unica was described by Ray Forster in 1954 and is the sole member of, and type species for, the New Zealand endemic genus Prasmiola in the opilionid (harvestman) family Triaenonychidae. The type specimen is held at Te Papa and was featured in the book 100 Natural History Treasures of Te Papa.

== Description ==
The colour of the female is pale orange-brown with faint black reticulate (net-like) markings on the upper surfaces of the chelicerae and pedipalps. The eyemound (a median tubercle with two simple eyes) is situated near the forward margin of the carapace and the upper surface of the body is covered with numerous small pustules. Prasmiola unica resembles members of the genus Prasma but can be distinguished by the lack of strong tubercles on the forward margin of the carapace and the tarsus (the furthermost part) of the first leg has more segments. The male of Prasmiola unica is unknown.

== Distribution ==
Only one collection record, from Day's Bay near Wellington, New Zealand, is known for this species. Ray Forster noted that "continuous searching in the type locality has failed to produce further material." It has been photographed at least twice since then, expanding the known range for this species to the Wainuiomata area. The single collecting record and two photographic observations span a period between February and July.

== Conservation status ==
Only the single collection record in Forster's description was known when this species was listed as 'nationally critical' in the New Zealand Threat Classification System (NZTCS). It is currently one of only two Opiliones species to be assessed under this system.
