= Austronuncia leleupi =

Scientific classification
- Kingdom: Animalia
- Phylum: Arthropoda
- Subphylum: Chelicerata
- Class: Arachnida
- Order: Opiliones
- Family: Triaenonychidae
- Genus: Austronuncia
- Species: A. leleupi

Binomial name
- Austronuncia leleupi Lawrence, 1963

Harvestman arachnid

Austronuncia leleupi is a harvestman arachnid of the family Triaenonychidae.
