= Diasia (genus) =

Scientific classification
- Kingdom: Animalia
- Phylum: Arthropoda
- Subphylum: Chelicerata
- Class: Arachnida
- Order: Opiliones
- Family: Triaenonychidae
- Genus: Diasia; Sørensen, 1902

Genus of harvestmen

Diasia is a genus of harvestmen in the family Triaenonychidae.

Diasia contains the following species:

- Diasia araucana E. A. Maury, 1987
- Diasia michaelseni Sørensen, 1902
- Diasia platnicki E. A. Maury, 1987
