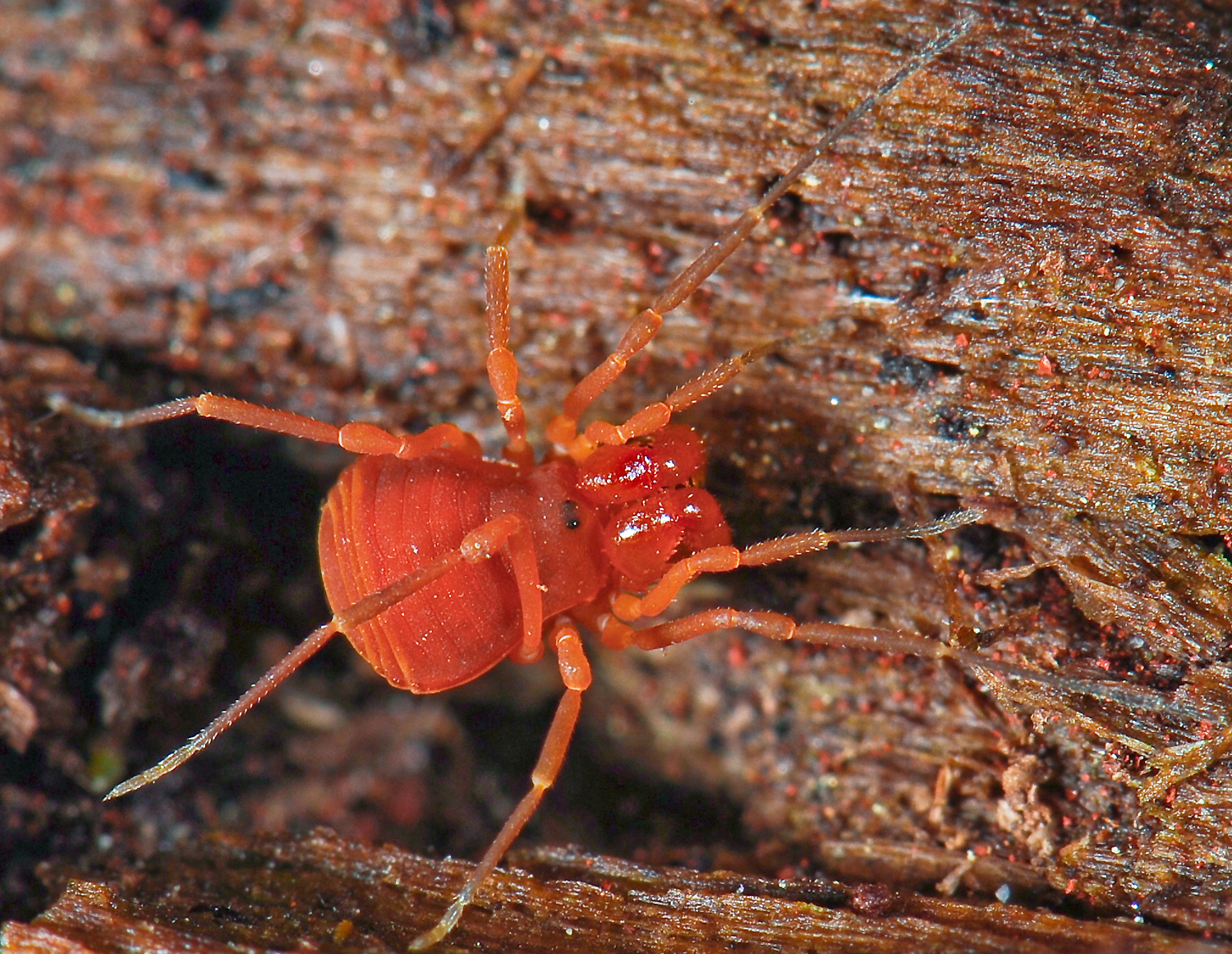
- S. robustus in Colorado

Scientific classification
- Kingdom: Animalia
- Phylum: Arthropoda
- Subphylum: Chelicerata
- Class: Arachnida
- Order: Opiliones
- Family: Paranonychidae
- Genus: Sclerobunus
- Species: S. robustus

Binomial name
- Sclerobunus robustus (Packard, 1877)

Synonyms
- Scotolemon robustus

= Sclerobunus robustus =

Species of harvestman/daddy longlegs

Sclerobunus robustus is a species of harvestman that occurs in the western United States, including Arizona, Colorado, New Mexico, and Utah. The species formerly consisted of three subspecies, two of which (S. glorietus and S. idahoensis) were elevated to full species status in 2014.
