= Callihamina =

Scientific classification
- Kingdom: Animalia
- Phylum: Arthropoda
- Subphylum: Chelicerata
- Class: Arachnida
- Order: Opiliones
- Family: Triaenonychidae
- Genus: Callihamina; Roewer, 1942
- Species: C. adelaidia

Binomial name
- Callihamina adelaidia Roewer, 1942

Genus of harvestmen

Callihamina is a monotypic genus of harvestmen in the family Triaenonychidae, part of the suborder Laniatores. Its only species is Callihamina adelaidia. It is native to South Australia.
