= Izunonychus =

Scientific classification
- Kingdom: Animalia
- Phylum: Arthropoda
- Subphylum: Chelicerata
- Class: Arachnida
- Order: Opiliones
- Suborder: Laniatores
- Infraorder: Insidiatores
- Superfamily: Travunioidea
- Family: Paranonychidae
- Genus: Izunonychus; Suzuki, 1975
- Species: I. ohruii

Binomial name
- Izunonychus ohruii Suzuki, 1975

Genus of harvestmen/daddy longlegs

Izunonychus is a monotypic genus of harvestman in the family Paranonychidae. There is one described species in Izunonychus, I. ohruii, endemic to Japan.
