= Triaenonychoidea =

Triaenonychoidea Temporal range: Palaeogene–present

Scientific classification
- Kingdom: Animalia
- Phylum: Arthropoda
- Subphylum: Chelicerata
- Class: Arachnida
- Order: Opiliones
- Suborder: Laniatores
- Infraorder: Insidiatores
- Superfamily: Triaenonychoidea; Sørensen, 1886

Type genus
- Triaenonyx Sørensen, 1886

Diversity
- 4 Families

Superfamily of harvestmen/daddy longlegs

Triaenonychoidea is a superfamily of armoured harvestmen in the order Opiliones. There are 4 families and more than 440 described species in Triaenonychoidea.

== Families ==
These four families belong to the superfamily Triaenonychoidea:

- Buemarinoidae Karaman, 2019
- Lomanellidae Mendes & Derkarabetian, 2021
- Synthetonychiidae Forster, 1954
- Triaenonychidae Sørensen, 1886 (Also see species listing)
