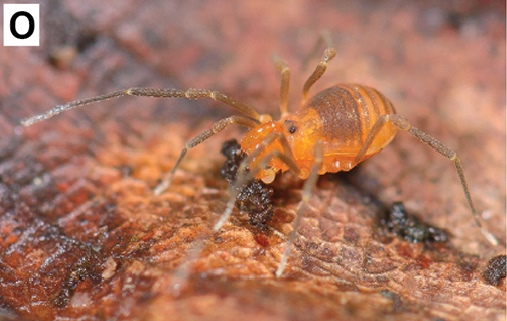
- Kainonychus akamai

Scientific classification
- Kingdom: Animalia
- Phylum: Arthropoda
- Subphylum: Chelicerata
- Class: Arachnida
- Order: Opiliones
- Suborder: Laniatores
- Infraorder: Insidiatores
- Superfamily: Travunioidea
- Family: Paranonychidae
- Genus: Kainonychus; Suzuki, 1975
- Species: K. akamai

Binomial name
- Kainonychus akamai (Suzuki, 1972)

= Kainonychus =

Genus of harvestmen/daddy longlegs

Kainonychus is a monotypic genus of harvestman in the family Paranonychidae. There is one described species in Kainonychus, K. akamai, endemic to Japan.
