= Nippononychus =

Scientific classification
- Kingdom: Animalia
- Phylum: Arthropoda
- Subphylum: Chelicerata
- Class: Arachnida
- Order: Opiliones
- Suborder: Laniatores
- Infraorder: Insidiatores
- Superfamily: Travunioidea
- Family: Paranonychidae
- Genus: Nippononychus; Suzuki, 1975
- Species: N. japonicus

Binomial name
- Nippononychus japonicus (Miyosi, 1957)

Genus of harvestmen/daddy longlegs

Nippononychus is a genus of harvestman in the family Paranonychidae. There is one described species in Nippononychus, N. japonicus, endemic to Japan.
