= Equitius (genus) =

Scientific classification
- Kingdom: Animalia
- Phylum: Arthropoda
- Subphylum: Chelicerata
- Class: Arachnida
- Order: Opiliones
- Family: Triaenonychidae
- Genus: Equitius; Simon, 1880

Genus of harvestmen

Equitius is a genus of harvestmen in the family Triaenonychidae.

Equitius contains the following species:

- Equitius altus (Forster, 1955)
- Equitius doriae Simon, 1880
- Equitius formidabilis G. S. Hunt, 1985
- Equitius manicatum (Roewer, 1920)
- Equitius meyersi (Phillips & Grimmett, 1932)
- Equitius montanus G. S. Hunt, 1985
- Equitius richardsae G. S. Hunt, 1985
- Equitius rotundum (Forster, 1955)
- Equitius spinatus (Pocock, 1903b)
- Equitius tambourineus (Roewer, 1920)
