= Abaddon despoliator =

Scientific classification
- Kingdom: Animalia
- Phylum: Arthropoda
- Subphylum: Chelicerata
- Class: Arachnida
- Order: Opiliones
- Family: Lomanellidae
- Genus: Abaddon; Derkarabetian & Baker, 2021
- Species: A. despoliator

Binomial name
- Abaddon despoliator Derkarabetian, 2021

Genus of arachnids

Abaddon is a genus of harvestman in the family Lomanellidae. It contains the single species Abaddon despoliator. The species was named after a Warhammer 40,000 character called "Abaddon the Despoiler," who is named after the Hebrew term Abaddon. It is known from south-western Western Australia.
