= Kaolinonychus =

Scientific classification
- Kingdom: Animalia
- Phylum: Arthropoda
- Subphylum: Chelicerata
- Class: Arachnida
- Order: Opiliones
- Suborder: Laniatores
- Infraorder: Insidiatores
- Superfamily: Travunioidea
- Family: Paranonychidae
- Genus: Kaolinonychus; Suzuki, 1975
- Species: K. coreanus

Binomial name
- Kaolinonychus coreanus Suzuki, 1966

Genus of harvestmen/daddy longlegs

Kaolinonychus is a monotypic genus of harvestman in the family Paranonychidae. There is one described species in Kaolinonychus, endemic to South Korea and found primarily in caves.

== Species ==
The single species genus Kaolinonychus contains two described subspecies:

- Kaolinonychus coreanus (Suzuki, 1966)

- Kaolinonychus coreanus coreanus (Suzuki, 1966)
- Kaolinonychus coreanus longipes (Suzuki, 1966)
