= Ankylonuncia =

Scientific classification
- Kingdom: Animalia
- Phylum: Arthropoda
- Subphylum: Chelicerata
- Class: Arachnida
- Order: Opiliones
- Family: Triaenonychidae
- Genus: Ankylonuncia; Hickman, 1958

Genus of harvestmen

Ankylonuncia is a genus of harvestmen in the family Triaenonychidae.

== Species ==
Ankylonuncia contains the following species:

- Ankylonuncia barrowensis Hickman, 1958
- Ankylonuncia fallax Hickman, 1958
- Ankylonuncia mestoni Hickman, 1958
