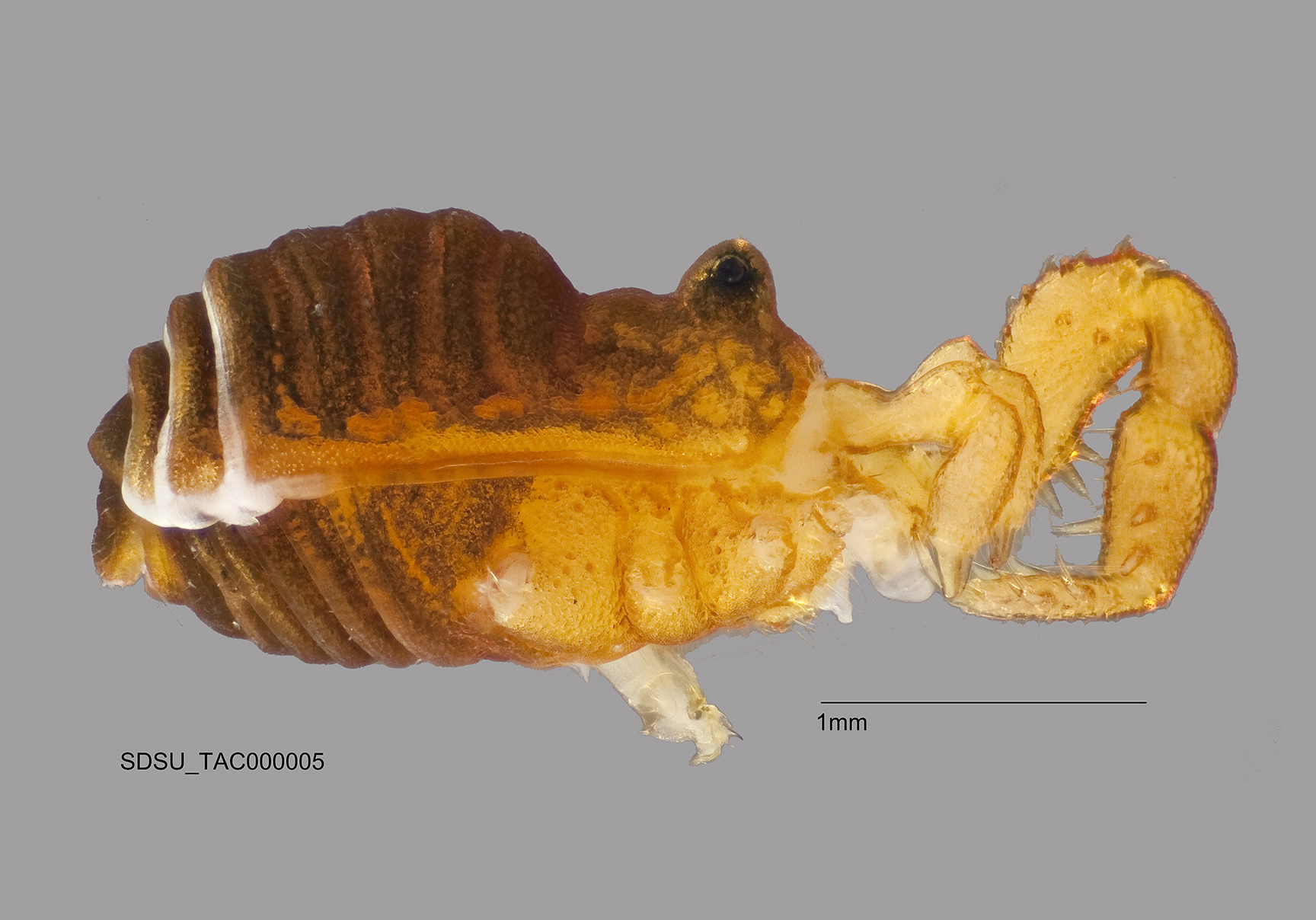

Scientific classification
- Kingdom: Animalia
- Phylum: Arthropoda
- Subphylum: Chelicerata
- Class: Arachnida
- Order: Opiliones
- Family: Paranonychidae
- Genus: Sclerobunus
- Species: S. idahoensis

Binomial name
- Sclerobunus idahoensis Briggs, 1971

Synonyms
- Sclerobunus robustus idahoensis Briggs, 1971

= Sclerobunus idahoensis =

Species of harvestman/daddy longlegs

Sclerobunus idahoensis is a species of armoured harvestman in the family Paranonychidae. It is found in North America.
