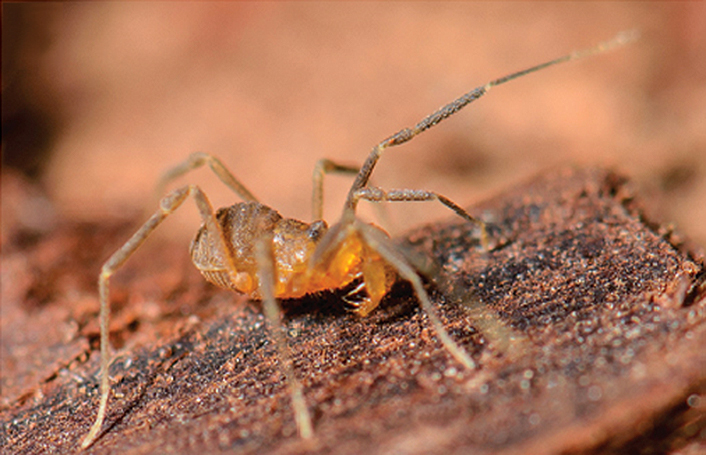

Scientific classification
- Kingdom: Animalia
- Phylum: Arthropoda
- Subphylum: Chelicerata
- Class: Arachnida
- Order: Opiliones
- Family: Paranonychidae
- Genus: Zuma
- Species: Z. acuta

Binomial name
- Zuma acuta C.J. Goodnight & M.L. Goodnight, 1942

= Zuma acuta =

Species of harvestman/daddy longlegs

Zuma acuta is a species of armoured harvestman in the family Paranonychidae. It is found Feramni Town, Michigan.
