= Biacumontia =

Scientific classification
- Kingdom: Animalia
- Phylum: Arthropoda
- Subphylum: Chelicerata
- Class: Arachnida
- Order: Opiliones
- Family: Triaenonychidae
- Genus: Biacumontia; Staręga, 1992

Genus of harvestmen

Biacumontia is a genus of harvestmen in the family Triaenonychidae.

== Species ==
Biacumontia contains the following species:

- Biacumontia cornuta Lawrence, 1931
- Biacumontia elata Kauri, 1961
- Biacumontia fissidens Lawrence, 1931
- Biacumontia maculata Lawrence, 1938
- Biacumontia paucidens Lawrence, 1931
- Biacumontia truncatidens Lawrence, 1931
- Biacumontia variegata Lawrence, 1934
