= Assamioidea =

Scientific classification
- Domain: Eukaryota
- Kingdom: Animalia
- Phylum: Arthropoda
- Subphylum: Chelicerata
- Class: Arachnida
- Order: Opiliones
- Infraorder: Grassatores
- Superfamily: Assamioidea; Sørensen, 1884

Superfamily of harvestmen/daddy longlegs

Assamioidea is the most diverse superfamily of the Grassatores. It includes around 540 species distributed in the Neotropics.

== Families ==
- Assamiidae Sørensen, 18843
- Pyramidopidae Sharma, Prieto & Giribet, 2011
- Suthepiidae Martens, 2020
- Trionyxellidae Roewer, 1912
