= Antongila spinigera =

Scientific classification
- Kingdom: Animalia
- Phylum: Arthropoda
- Subphylum: Chelicerata
- Class: Arachnida
- Order: Opiliones
- Family: Triaenonychidae
- Genus: Antongila; Roewer, 1931
- Species: A. spinigera

Binomial name
- Antongila spinigera Roewer, 1931

Species of harvestman

Antongila spinigera is a species of harvestman in a monotypic genus in the family Triaenonychidae.
