= Montadaeum =

Scientific classification
- Kingdom: Animalia
- Phylum: Arthropoda
- Subphylum: Chelicerata
- Class: Arachnida
- Order: Opiliones
- Family: Triaenonychidae
- Genus: Montadaeum; Lawrence, 1931
- Species: M. purcelli

Binomial name
- Montadaeum purcelli Lawrence, 1931

Genus of harvestmen

Montadaeum is a monotypic genus of harvestmen in the family Triaenonychidae. Its only species is Montadaeum purcelli.
