= Hedwiga (genus) =

Scientific classification
- Kingdom: Animalia
- Phylum: Arthropoda
- Subphylum: Chelicerata
- Class: Arachnida
- Order: Opiliones
- Family: Triaenonychidae
- Genus: Hedwiga; Roewer, 1931
- Species: H. manubriata

Binomial name
- Hedwiga manubriata Roewer, 1931

Genus of harvestmen

Hedwiga manubriata is a monotypic genus of harvestmen in the family Triaenonychidae. Its only species is Hedwiga manubriata.
