= Austromontia =

Scientific classification
- Kingdom: Animalia
- Phylum: Arthropoda
- Subphylum: Chelicerata
- Class: Arachnida
- Order: Opiliones
- Family: Triaenonychidae
- Genus: Austromontia; Staręga, 1992

Genus of harvestmen

Austromontia is a genus of harvestmen in the family Triaenonychidae.

== Species ==
Austromontia contains the following species:

- Austromontia bidentata Lawrence, 1934
- Austromontia caledonica Lawrence, 1931
- Austromontia capensis Lawrence, 1931
- Austromontia formosa Lawrence, 1963
- Austromontia litoralis Lawrence, 1934
- Austromontia silvatica Lawrence, 1931
