= Heteronuncia =

Scientific classification
- Kingdom: Animalia
- Phylum: Arthropoda
- Subphylum: Chelicerata
- Class: Arachnida
- Order: Opiliones
- Family: Triaenonychidae
- Genus: Heteronuncia; Roewer, 1920
- Species: H. robusta

Binomial name
- Heteronuncia robusta Roewer, 1920

Genus of harvestman

Heteronuncia is a monotypic genus of harvestmen in the family Triaenonychidae. Its only species is Heteronuncia robusta.
