= Graemontia =

Scientific classification
- Kingdom: Animalia
- Phylum: Arthropoda
- Subphylum: Chelicerata
- Class: Arachnida
- Order: Opiliones
- Family: Triaenonychidae
- Genus: Graemontia; Staręga, 1992

Genus of harvestmen

Graemontia is a genus of harvestmen in the family Triaenonychidae.

Graemontia contains the following species:

- Graemontia bicornigera Lawrence, 1963
- Graemontia bifidens Lawrence, 1931
- Graemontia decorata Lawrence, 1938
- Graemontia dentichelis Lawrence, 1931
- Graemontia erecta Kauri, 1961
- Graemontia natalensis Lawrence, 1937
- Graemontia viridiceps Kury, 2006
