= Hendeola =

Scientific classification
- Kingdom: Animalia
- Phylum: Arthropoda
- Subphylum: Chelicerata
- Class: Arachnida
- Order: Opiliones
- Family: Triaenonychidae
- Genus: Hendeola; Forster, 1954

Genus of harvestmen

Hendeola is a genus of harvestmen in the family Triaenonychidae.

== Species ==
Hendeola contains the following species:

- Hendeola bullata Forster, 1954
- Hendeola woodwardi Forster, 1954
