= Cluniella =

Scientific classification
- Kingdom: Animalia
- Phylum: Arthropoda
- Subphylum: Chelicerata
- Class: Arachnida
- Order: Opiliones
- Family: Triaenonychidae
- Genus: Cluniella; Forster, 1955

Genus of harvestmen

Cluniella is a genus of harvestmen in the family Triaenonychidae.

== Species ==
Cluniella contains the following species:

- Cluniella distincta Forster, 1955
- Cluniella minuta Forster, 1955
- Cluniella ornata Forster, 1955
