= Ankaratrix =

Scientific classification
- Kingdom: Animalia
- Phylum: Arthropoda
- Subphylum: Chelicerata
- Class: Arachnida
- Order: Opiliones
- Family: Triaenonychidae
- Genus: Ankaratrix; Lawrence, 1959

Genus of harvestmen

Ankaratrix is a genus of harvestmen in the family Triaenonychidae.

== Species ==
Ankaratrix contains the following species:

- Ankaratrix cancrops Lawrence, 1959
- Ankaratrix illota Lawrence, 1959
- Ankaratrix makamba Porto & Pérez-González, 2020
- Ankaratrix lawrencei Porto & Pérez-González, 2020
- Ankaratrix fisheri Porto & Pérez-González, 2020
- Ankaratrix maloto Porto & Pérez-González, 2020
