= Calliuncus =

Scientific classification
- Kingdom: Animalia
- Phylum: Arthropoda
- Subphylum: Chelicerata
- Class: Arachnida
- Order: Opiliones
- Family: Triaenonychidae
- Genus: Calliuncus; Roewer, 1931

Genus of harvestmen

Calliuncus is a genus of harvestmen in the family Triaenonychidae.

== Species ==
- Calliuncus ephippiatus Roewer, 1931
- Calliuncus ferrugineus Roewer, 1931
- Calliuncus glaber Kauri, 1954
- Calliuncus labyrinthus Hunt, 1972
- Calliuncus odoratus Hickman, 1958
- Calliuncus vulsus Hickman, 1959
