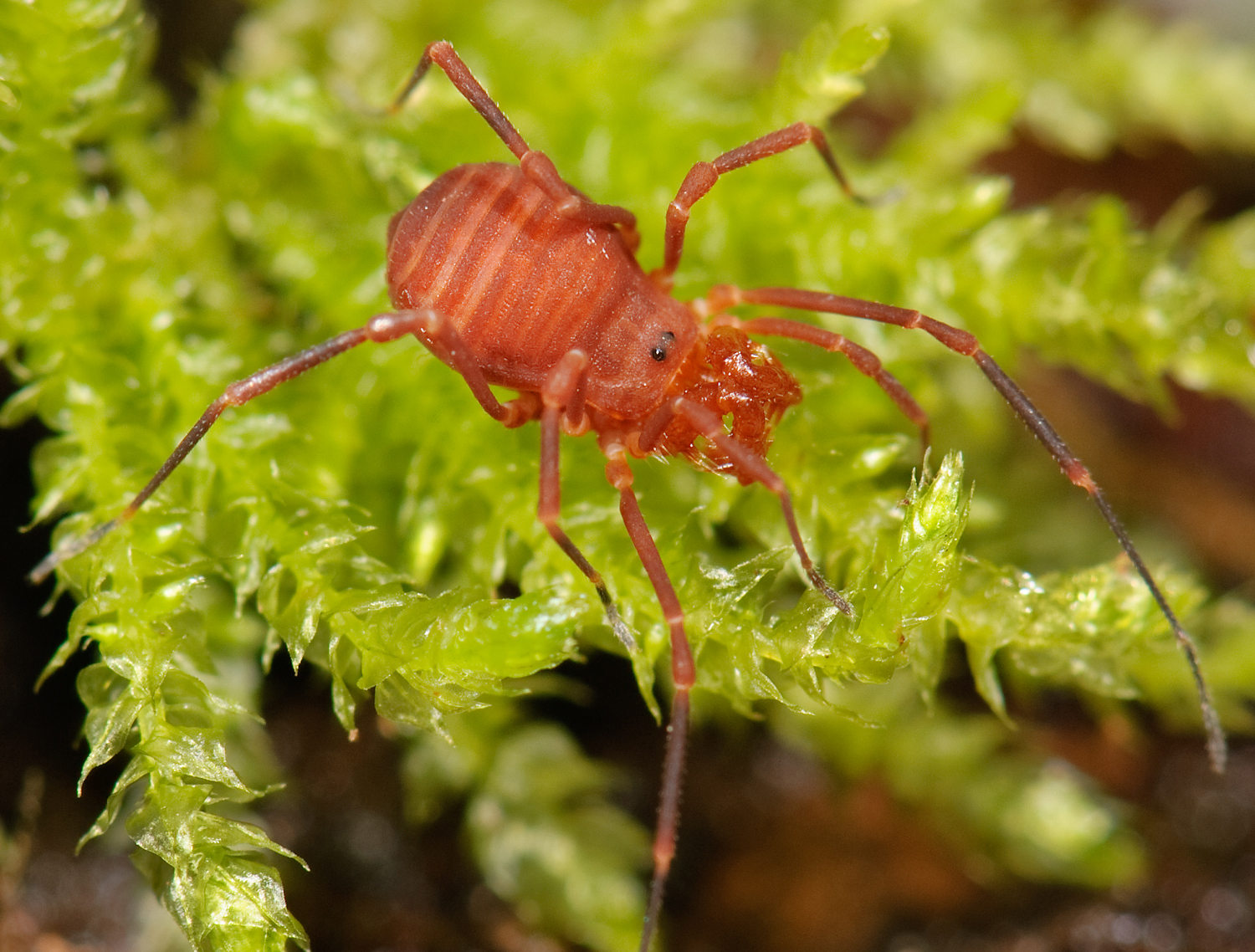

Scientific classification
- Kingdom: Animalia
- Phylum: Arthropoda
- Subphylum: Chelicerata
- Class: Arachnida
- Order: Opiliones
- Family: Paranonychidae
- Genus: Sclerobunus
- Species: S. nondimorphicus

Binomial name
- Sclerobunus nondimorphicus Briggs, 1971

= Sclerobunus nondimorphicus =

Species of harvestman/daddy longlegs

Sclerobunus nondimorphicus is a species of armoured harvestman in the family Paranonychidae. It is found in North America within the Pacific Northwest.
