= Breviacantha =

Scientific classification
- Kingdom: Animalia
- Phylum: Arthropoda
- Subphylum: Chelicerata
- Class: Arachnida
- Order: Opiliones
- Family: Triaenonychidae
- Genus: Breviacantha; Kauri, 1954
- Species: B. gisleni

Binomial name
- Breviacantha gisleni Kauri, 1954

Genus of harvestmen

Breviacantha gisleni is a species of harvestmen in a monotypic genus in the family Triaenonychidae.
