= Gunvoria =

Scientific classification
- Kingdom: Animalia
- Phylum: Arthropoda
- Subphylum: Chelicerata
- Class: Arachnida
- Order: Opiliones
- Family: Triaenonychidae
- Genus: Gunvoria; Kauri, 1961
- Species: G. spatulata

Binomial name
- Gunvoria spatulata Kauri, 1961

Genus of harvestmen

Gunvoria is a monotypic genus of harvestmen in the family Triaenonychidae. Its only species is Gunvoria spatulata.
