= Brasiloctis =

Scientific classification
- Kingdom: Animalia
- Phylum: Arthropoda
- Subphylum: Chelicerata
- Class: Arachnida
- Order: Opiliones
- Family: Triaenonychidae
- Genus: Brasiloctis; Mello-Leitão, 1938
- Species: B. bucki

Binomial name
- Brasiloctis bucki Mello-Leitão, 1938

Genus of harvestmen

Brasiloctis bucki is a species of harvestmen in a monotypic genus in the family Triaenonychidae.
