= Zuma tioga =

Scientific classification
- Kingdom: Animalia
- Phylum: Arthropoda
- Subphylum: Chelicerata
- Class: Arachnida
- Order: Opiliones
- Family: Paranonychidae
- Genus: Zuma
- Species: Z. tioga

Binomial name
- Zuma tioga Briggs, 1971

Species of harvestman/daddy longlegs

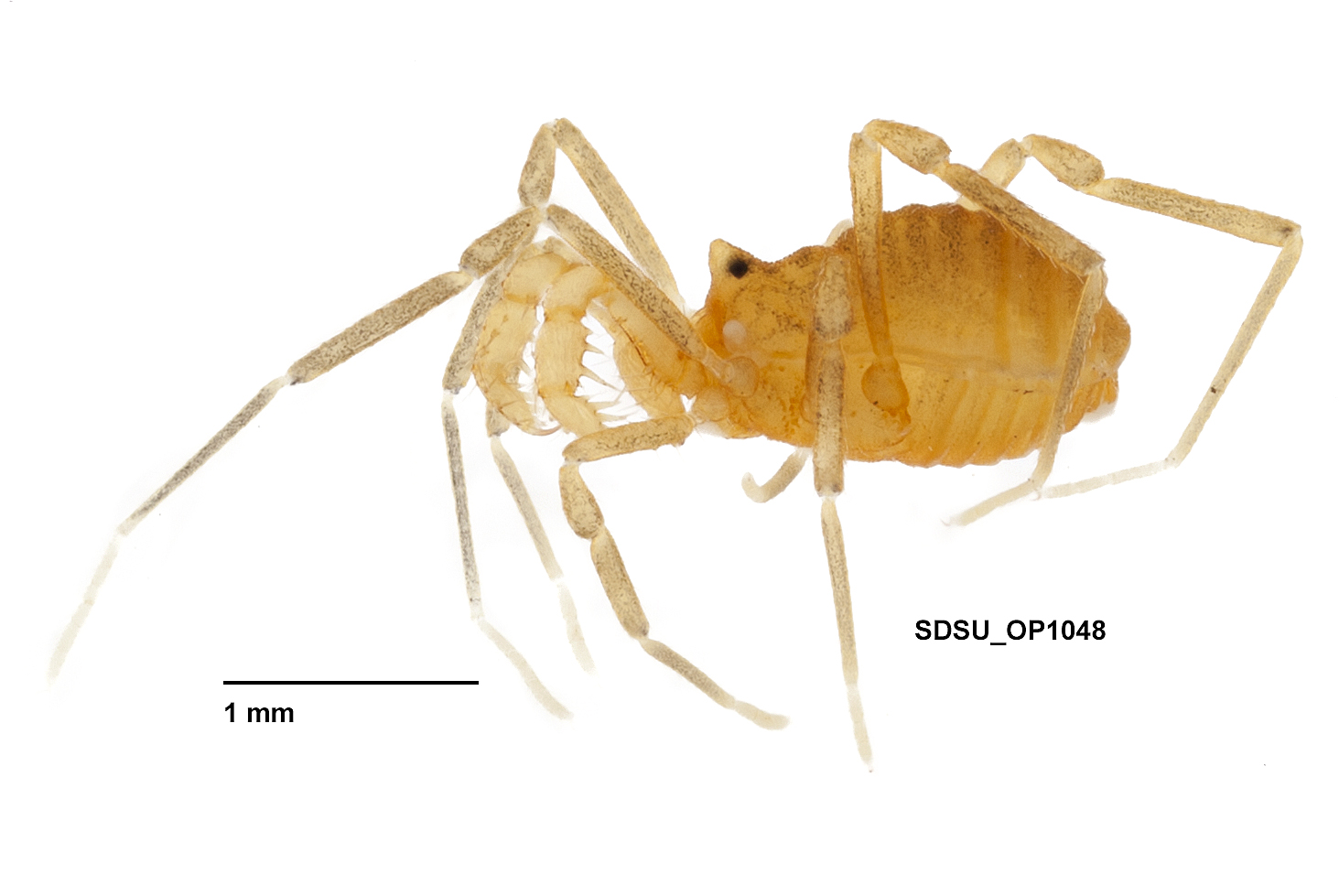
Zuma tioga Briggs, 1971 (SDSU OP1048)

Zuma tioga is a species of armoured harvestman in the family Paranonychidae. It is found in North America.
