= Ceratomontia =

Scientific classification
- Kingdom: Animalia
- Phylum: Arthropoda
- Subphylum: Chelicerata
- Class: Arachnida
- Order: Opiliones
- Family: Triaenonychidae
- Genus: Ceratomontia; Roewer, 1915

Genus of harvestmen

Ceratomontia is a genus of harvestmen in the family Triaenonychidae.

== Species ==
Ceratomontia contains the following species:

- Ceratomontia annae Lawrence, 1934
- Ceratomontia argentina Canals, 1939
- Ceratomontia brasiliana Maury, 1999
- Ceratomontia capensis Roewer, 1915
- Ceratomontia centralis Maury & Roig Alsina, 1985
- Ceratomontia cheliplus Roewer, 1931
- Ceratomontia fluvialis Lawrence, 1931
- Ceratomontia irregularis Lawrence, 1931
- Ceratomontia karooensis Lawrence, 1931
- Ceratomontia mendocina Maury & Roig Alsina, 1985
- Ceratomontia minor Lawrence, 1931
- Ceratomontia namaqua Lawrence, 1934
- Ceratomontia nasuta Lawrence, 1934
- Ceratomontia pusilla Lawrence, 1934
- Ceratomontia reticulata Lawrence, 1934
- Ceratomontia rumpiana Lawrence, 1937
- Ceratomontia ruticola Lawrence, 1934
- Ceratomontia sanguinea Lawrence, 1934
- Ceratomontia setosa Lawrence, 1931
- Ceratomontia tabulae Lawrence, 1931
- Ceratomontia thorni Lawrence, 1934
- Ceratomontia werneri Lawrence, 1931
