= Decarynella =

Scientific classification
- Kingdom: Animalia
- Phylum: Arthropoda
- Subphylum: Chelicerata
- Class: Arachnida
- Order: Opiliones
- Family: Triaenonychidae
- Genus: Decarynella; Fage, 1945
- Species: D. gracillipes

Binomial name
- Decarynella gracillipes Fage, 1945

Genus of harvestmen

Decarynella is a monotypic genus of harvestmen the family Triaenonychidae. Its only species is Decarynella gracillipes.
