= Yulella =

Scientific classification
- Domain: Eukaryota
- Kingdom: Animalia
- Phylum: Arthropoda
- Subphylum: Chelicerata
- Class: Arachnida
- Order: Opiliones
- Family: Triaenonychidae
- Genus: Yulella; Lawrence, 1939
- Species: Y. natalensis

Binomial name
- Yulella natalensis (Lawrence, 1937)

Genus of harvestmen/daddy longlegs

Yulella is a genus of harvestmen in the family Triaenonychidae. It is monotypic, being represented by the single species, Yulella natalensis.
