= Diaenobunus =

Scientific classification
- Kingdom: Animalia
- Phylum: Arthropoda
- Subphylum: Chelicerata
- Class: Arachnida
- Order: Opiliones
- Family: Triaenonychidae
- Genus: Diaenobunus; Roewer, 1914
- Species: D. armatus

Binomial name
- Diaenobunus armatus Roewer, 1914

Genus of harvestmen

Diaenobunus is a monotypic genus of harvestmen in the family Triaenonychidae. Its only species is Diaenobunus armatus.
