= Karamea (harvestman) =

Scientific classification
- Kingdom: Animalia
- Phylum: Arthropoda
- Subphylum: Chelicerata
- Class: Arachnida
- Order: Opiliones
- Family: Triaenonychidae
- Subfamily: Soerensenellinae
- Genus: Karamea; Forster, 1954

Genus of harvestmen

Karamea is a genus of armoured harvestmen in the family Triaenonychidae. There are at least four described species in Karamea, found in New Zealand.

== Species ==
These four species belong to the genus Karamea:

- Karamea lobata Forster, 1954
- Karamea trailli (Hogg, 1920)
- Karamea tricerata Forster, 1954
- Karamea tuthilli Forster, 1954
