= Callihamus =

Scientific classification
- Kingdom: Animalia
- Phylum: Arthropoda
- Subphylum: Chelicerata
- Class: Arachnida
- Order: Opiliones
- Family: Triaenonychidae
- Genus: Callihamus; Hickman, 1958
- Species: C. badius

Binomial name
- Callihamus badius Roewer, 1931

Genus of harvestmen

Callihamus is a monotypic genus of harvestmen in the Triaenonychidae family. Its only species is Callihamus badius.
