= Micradaeum =

Scientific classification
- Kingdom: Animalia
- Phylum: Arthropoda
- Subphylum: Chelicerata
- Class: Arachnida
- Order: Opiliones
- Family: Triaenonychidae
- Genus: Micradaeum; Lawrence, 1931
- Species: Micradaeum M. rugosum

Binomial name
- Micradaeum M. rugosum Lawrence, 1931

Genus of harvestmen

Micradaeum is a monotypic genus of harvestmen in the family Triaenonychidae. Its only species is Micradaeum rugosum.
