= Conoculus =

Scientific classification
- Domain: Eukaryota
- Kingdom: Animalia
- Phylum: Arthropoda
- Subphylum: Chelicerata
- Class: Arachnida
- Order: Opiliones
- Family: Triaenonychidae
- Genus: Conoculus; Forster, 1949
- Species: C. asperus

Binomial name
- Conoculus asperus Forster, 1949

Genus of harvestmen/daddy longlegs

Conoculus is a genus of harvestmen in the family Triaenonychidae. It is monotypic, being represented by the single species, Conoculus asperus.
