= Promecostethus =

Scientific classification
- Kingdom: Animalia
- Phylum: Arthropoda
- Subphylum: Chelicerata
- Class: Arachnida
- Order: Opiliones
- Family: Triaenonychidae
- Genus: Promecostethus
- Species: P. unifalculatus

Binomial name
- Promecostethus unifalculatus Enderlein, 1909

Genus of harvestmen

Promecostethus unifalculatus is a species of harvestmen in a monotypic genus in the family Triaenonychidae.
