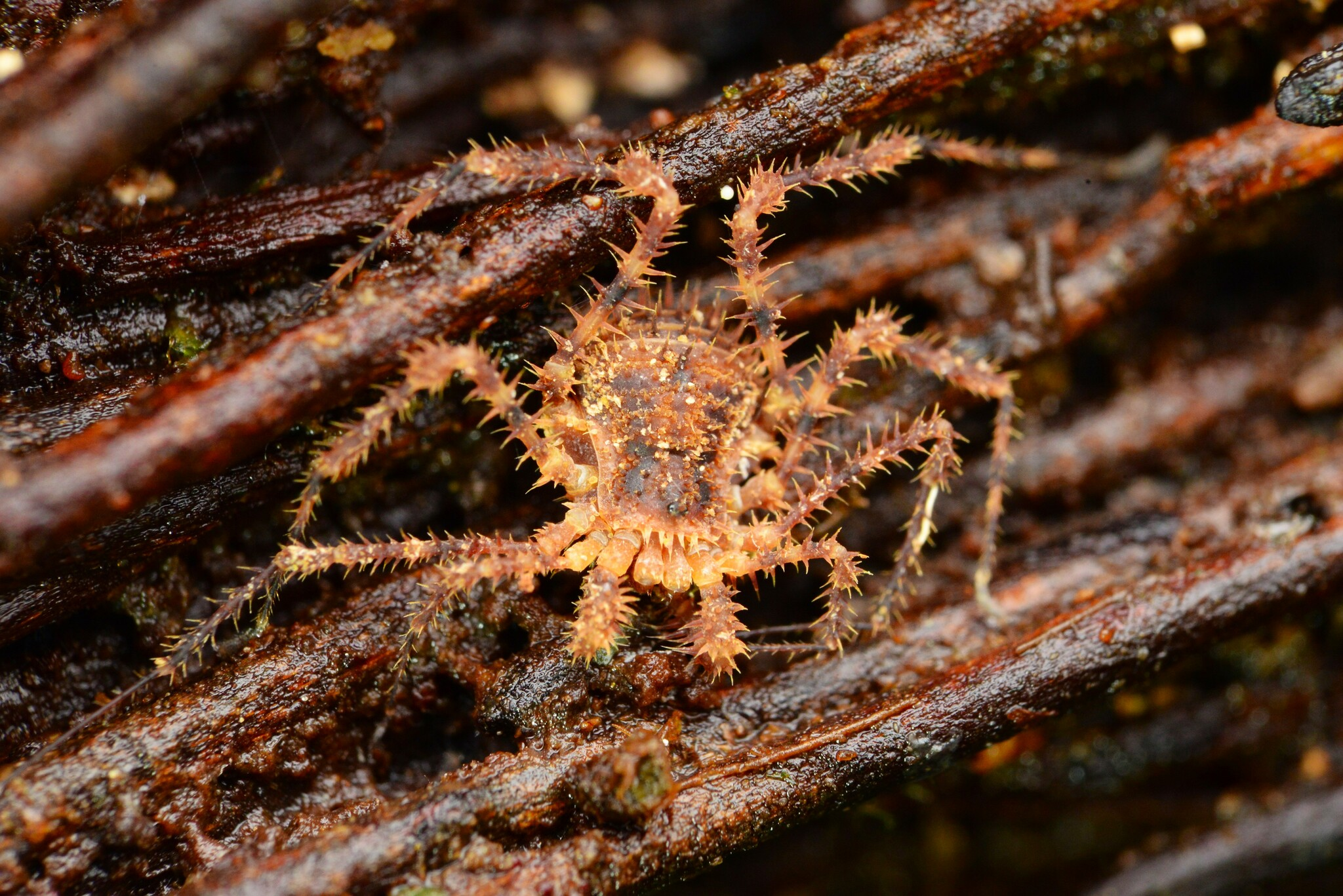
- Triregia fairburni

Scientific classification
- Kingdom: Animalia
- Phylum: Arthropoda
- Subphylum: Chelicerata
- Class: Arachnida
- Order: Opiliones
- Family: Triaenonychidae
- Subfamily: Triaenonychinae; Sørensen, 1886

Genera
- See text

= Triaenonychinae =

Subfamily of arachnids (harvestmen/daddy longlegs)

Triaenonychinae is a subfamily of harvestmen in the family Triaenonychidae.

== Description ==
The subfamily was defined within Triaenonychidae

== Taxonomy ==
Triaenonychinae contains multiple genera, as of revision now contains:

- Acumontia Loman, 1898

etc.
