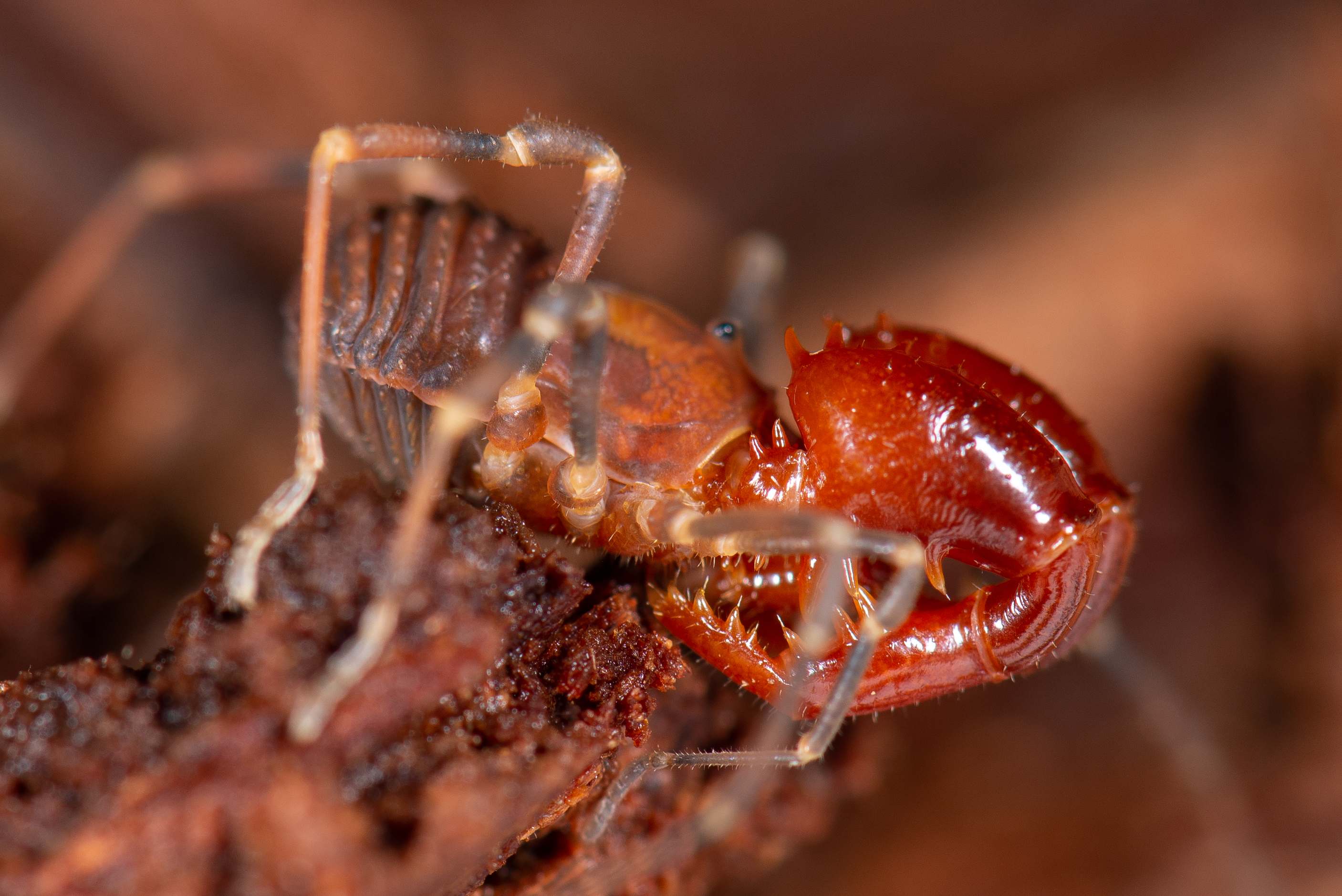

Scientific classification
- Domain: Eukaryota
- Kingdom: Animalia
- Phylum: Arthropoda
- Subphylum: Chelicerata
- Class: Arachnida
- Order: Opiliones
- Family: Triaenonychidae
- Genus: Allonuncia; Hickman, 1958
- Species: A. grandis

Binomial name
- Allonuncia grandis Hickman, 1958

= Allonuncia =

Allonuncia grandis

Genus of harvestmen

Allonuncia is a genus of harvestmen in the family Triaenonychidae. It is monotypic, being represented by the single species Allonuncia grandis.
