= Austronuncia =

Scientific classification
- Kingdom: Animalia
- Phylum: Arthropoda
- Subphylum: Chelicerata
- Class: Arachnida
- Order: Opiliones
- Family: Triaenonychidae
- Genus: Austronuncia; Lawrence, 1931

Genus of harvestmen

Austronuncia is a genus of harvestmen in the family Triaenonychidae.

== Species ==
Austronuncia contains the following species:

- Austronuncia leleupi Lawrence, 1963
- Austronuncia spinipalpis Lawrence, 1931
