= Acumontia =

Scientific classification
- Kingdom: Animalia
- Phylum: Arthropoda
- Subphylum: Chelicerata
- Class: Arachnida
- Order: Opiliones
- Family: Triaenonychidae
- Genus: Acumontia; Loman, 1898

Synonyms
- Bezavonia Roewer, 1949; Spinimontia Roewer, 1915; Tanalaius Roewer, 1915; Triacumontia Roewer, 1915; Triaenomontia Roewer, 1915

Genus of harvestmen

Acumontia is a genus of harvestmen in the family Triaenonychidae.

== Species ==
Acumontia contains the following species:

- Acumontia alluaudi (Roewer, 1914)
- Acumontia armata Loman, 1898
- Acumontia capitata (Lawrence, 1959)
- Acumontia cowani Pocock, 1903
- Acumontia draconensis Lawrence, 1939
- Acumontia echinata Pocock, 1903
- Acumontia flavispinus (Lawrence, 1959)
- Acumontia hystrix (Lawrence, 1959)
- Acumontia lomani (Roewer, 1914)
- Acumontia lomani (Roewer, 1914)
- Acumontia longipes Lawrence, 1959
- Acumontia majori Pocock, 1902
- Acumontia milloti (Lawrence, 1959)
- Acumontia natalensis Lawrence, 1931
- Acumontia pococki Roewer, 1914
- Acumontia roberti Pocock, 1903
- Acumontia roeweri Starega, 1992
- Acumontia rostrata Pocock, 1902
- Acumontia soerenseni (Roewer, 1914)
- Acumontia spinifrons (Roewer, 1914)
- Acumontia succinea (Mendes & Kury, 2012)
- Acumontia venator (Roewer, 1931)
