= Lomanellidae =

- Abaddon despoliator

Scientific classification
- Kingdom: Animalia
- Phylum: Arthropoda
- Subphylum: Chelicerata
- Class: Arachnida
- Order: Opiliones
- Superfamily: Triaenonychoidea
- Family: Lomanellidae; Mendes & Derkarabetian, 2021

Genera
- Lomanella Pocock, 1903; Abaddon Derkarabetian & Baker, 2021

Family of harvestmen

Lomanellidae is a family of harvestmen. Species in this family are endemic to Australia.

== Genera ==
- Lomanella Pocock, 1903
- Abaddon Derkarabetian & Baker, 2021
