= Hendea =

Scientific classification
- Kingdom: Animalia
- Phylum: Arthropoda
- Subphylum: Chelicerata
- Class: Arachnida
- Order: Opiliones
- Family: Triaenonychidae
- Genus: Hendea; Roewer, 1931

Genus of harvestman

Hendea is a genus of harvestmen in the family Triaenonychidae.

== Species ==
Hendea contains the following species:

- Hendea aurora Forster, 1965
- Hendea bucculenta Forster, 1954
- Hendea coatesi Forster, 1965
- Hendea fiordensis Forster, 1954
- Hendea hendei Roewer, 1931
- Hendea maini Forster, 1965
- Hendea maitaia Forster, 1954
- Hendea myersi Forster, 1954
- Hendea nelsonensis Forster, 1954
- Hendea oconnori Forster, 1954
- Hendea phillippsi Forster, 1954
- Hendea spina Forster, 1965
- Hendea takaka Forster, 1965
- Hendea townsendi Forster, 1965
