= Bryonuncia =

Scientific classification
- Kingdom: Animalia
- Phylum: Arthropoda
- Subphylum: Chelicerata
- Class: Arachnida
- Order: Opiliones
- Family: Triaenonychidae
- Genus: Bryonuncia; Hickman, 1958
- Species: B. distincta

Binomial name
- Bryonuncia distincta Hickman, 1958

Genus of harvestmen

Bryonuncia distincta is a species of harvestmen in a monotypic genus in the family Triaenonychidae.
