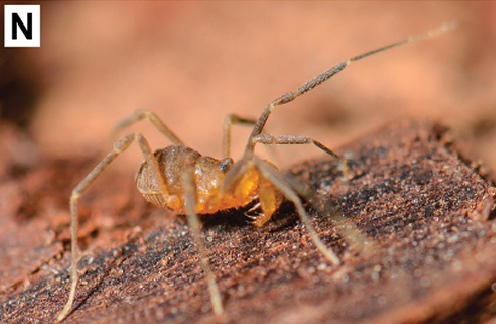
- Zuma acuta

Scientific classification
- Kingdom: Animalia
- Phylum: Arthropoda
- Subphylum: Chelicerata
- Class: Arachnida
- Order: Opiliones
- Family: Paranonychidae
- Genus: Zuma; C.J. Goodnight & M.L. Goodnight, 1942

= Zuma (harvestman) =

Genus of harvestmen/daddy longlegs

Zuma is a genus of harvestman in the family Paranonychidae. There are at least two described species in Zuma, found in central and northern California.

== Species ==
These two species belong to the genus Zuma:

- Zuma acuta C.J. Goodnight & M.L. Goodnight, 1942
- Zuma tioga Briggs, 1971
