= Metanonychus =

Scientific classification
- Kingdom: Animalia
- Phylum: Arthropoda
- Subphylum: Chelicerata
- Class: Arachnida
- Order: Opiliones
- Family: Paranonychidae
- Genus: Metanonychus; Briggs, 1971

Genus of harvestmen/daddy longlegs

Metanonychus is a genus of harvestman in the family Paranonychidae. There are eight described species in Metanonychus, found in the northwestern United States.

== Species ==
These eight species belong to the genus Metanonychus:

- Metanonychus cascadus Briggs, 1971
- Metanonychus idahoensis Briggs, 1971
- Metanonychus mazamus Briggs, 1971
- Metanonychus mechanicus Derkarabetian and Hedin, 2019
- Metanonychus navarrus Briggs, 1971
- Metanonychus nigricans Briggs, 1971
- Metanonychus oregonus Briggs, 1971
- Metanonychus setulus Briggs, 1971
