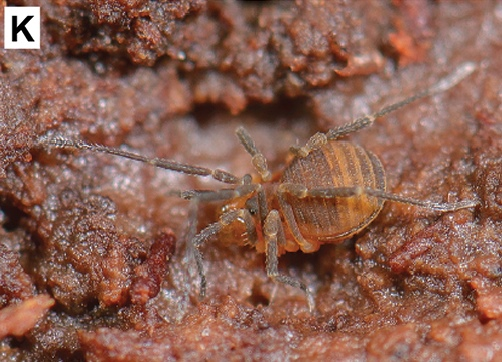
- Paranonychus brunneus

Scientific classification
- Kingdom: Animalia
- Phylum: Arthropoda
- Subphylum: Chelicerata
- Class: Arachnida
- Order: Opiliones
- Family: Paranonychidae
- Genus: Paranonychus; Briggs, 1971

Synonyms
- Mutsunonychus Suzuki 1976

= Paranonychus =

Genus of harvestmen/daddy longlegs

Paranonychus is a genus of harvestman in the family Paranonychidae. There are three described species in Paranonychus. The Japanese species Paranonychus fuscus was originally described in its own genus as Mutsunonychus fuscus Suzuki 1976, but considered its own species and part of Paranonychus in later studies.

== Species ==
These three species belong to the genus Paranonychus:

- Paranonychus brunneus (Banks, 1893) – USA (Oregon, Washington to Alaska), Canada (British Columbia).
- Paranonychus concolor Briggs, 1971 – USA (Oregon, single location in Cascade range).
- Paranonychus fuscus (Suzuki, 1976) – Japan (widespread northern Honshu, Aomori Pref. etc.).
