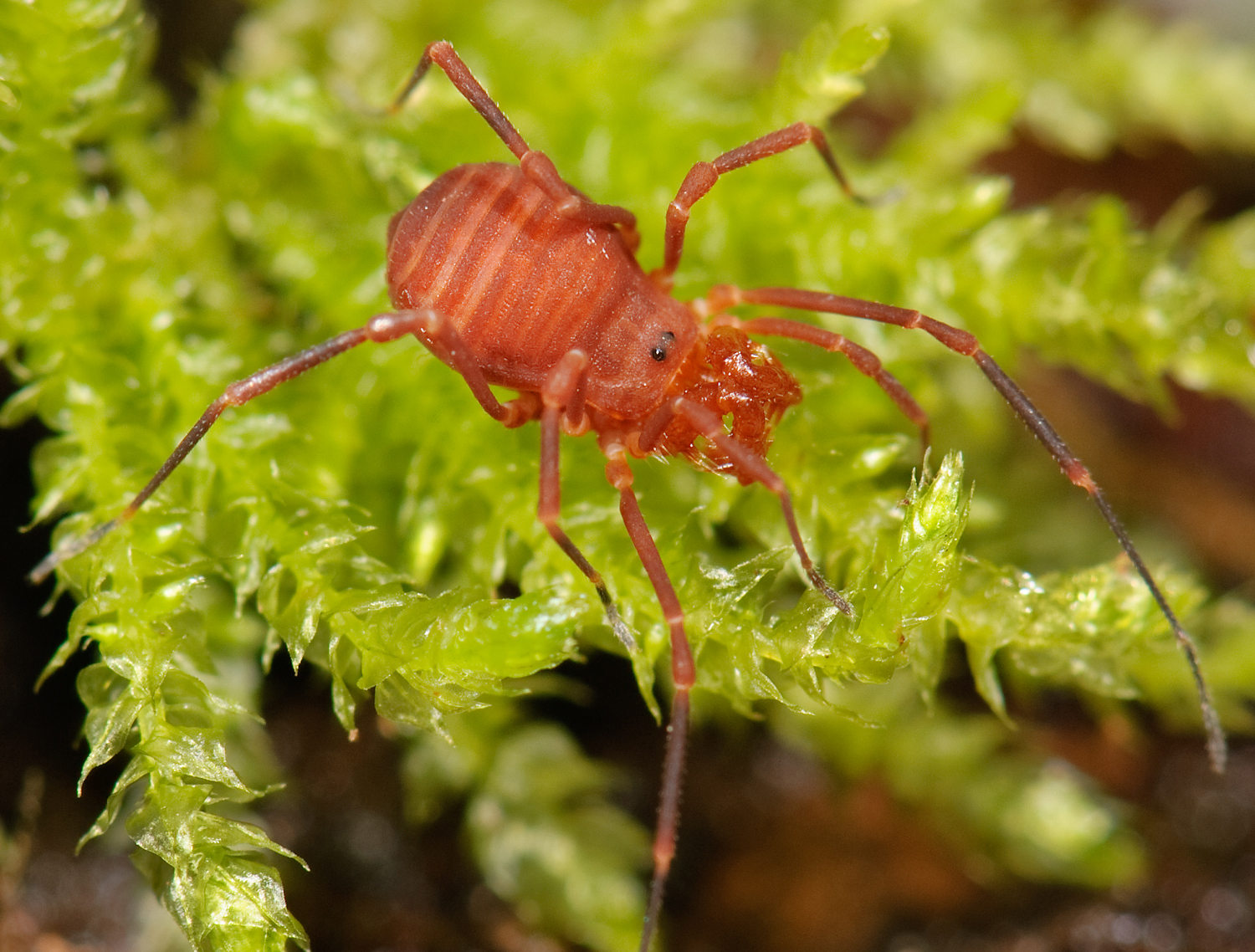
- S. nondimorphicus

Scientific classification
- Kingdom: Animalia
- Phylum: Arthropoda
- Subphylum: Chelicerata
- Class: Arachnida
- Order: Opiliones
- Family: Paranonychidae
- Genus: Sclerobunus; Banks, 1893

Type species
- Scotolemon robustus Packard, 1877

Species
- See text

Synonyms
- Cyptobunus Banks, 1905

= Sclerobunus =

Genus of harvestmen/daddy longlegs

Sclerobunus is a genus of harvestman that occurs in western North America.

== Species ==
Sclerobunus was revised in a 2014 study, which described 5 new species, and Cyptobunus as a junior synonym of Sclerobunus. In addition, several populations formerly considered subspecies were elevated to full species rank.

- Sclerobunus cavicolus Banks, 1905 – USA: Montana (Note: Several studies adopt use a later misspelling "cavicolens")
- Sclerobunus glorietus (Briggs, 1971) – USA: New Mexico
- Sclerobunus idahoensis (Briggs, 1971) – USA: Idaho and Montana
- Sclerobunus jemez Derkarabetian & Hedin, 2014 – USA: New Mexico
- Sclerobunus klomax Derkarabetian & Hedin, 2014 – USA: New Mexico
- Sclerobunus madhousensis (Briggs, 1971) – USA: Utah
- Sclerobunus nondimorphicus Briggs, 1971 – USA: Oregon, Washington, and British Columbia
- Sclerobunus robustus (Packard, 1877) – USA: Arizona, Colorado, New Mexico, and Utah
- Sclerobunus skywalkeri Derkarabetian & Hedin, 2014 – USA: New Mexico
- Sclerobunus speoventus Derkarabetian & Hedin, 2014 – USA: Colorado
- Sclerobunus steinmanni Derkarabetian & Hedin, 2014 – USA: Colorado
- Sclerobunus ungulatus Briggs, 1971 – USA: Nevada
