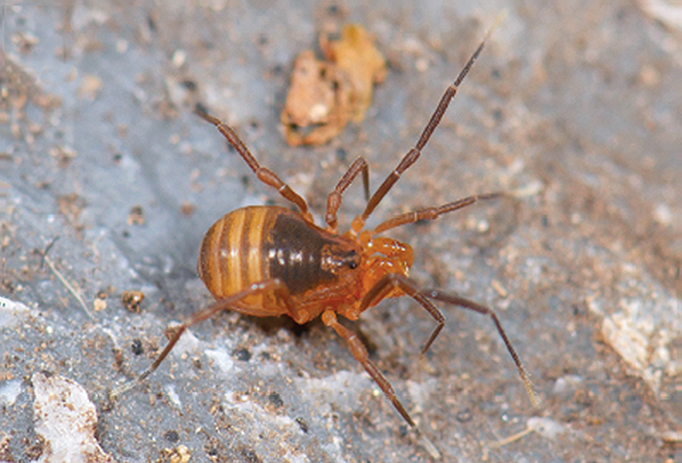

Scientific classification
- Kingdom: Animalia
- Phylum: Arthropoda
- Subphylum: Chelicerata
- Class: Arachnida
- Order: Opiliones
- Family: Paranonychidae
- Genus: Metanippononychus; Suzuki, 1975

= Metanippononychus =

Genus of harvestmen/daddy longlegs

Metanippononychus is a genus of harvestman in the family Paranonychidae. There are at least four described species in Metanippononychus.

== Species ==
These four species belong to the genus Metanippononychus:

- Metanippononychus daisenensis Suzuki, 1975
- Metanippononychus iriei Suzuki, 1975
- Metanippononychus iyanus Suzuki, 1975
- Metanippononychus tomishimai Suzuki, 1975
