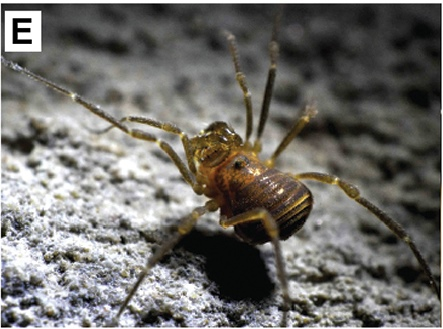
- Peltonychia leprieurii

Scientific classification
- Kingdom: Animalia
- Phylum: Arthropoda
- Subphylum: Chelicerata
- Class: Arachnida
- Order: Opiliones
- Suborder: Laniatores
- Infraorder: Insidiatores
- Superfamily: Travunioidea; Absolon & Kratochvil, 1932

Type genus
- Travunia

Diversity
- 4 Families

= Travunioidea =

Travunioidea Temporal range: Palaeogene–present

Superfamily of harvestmen/daddy longlegs

Travunioidea is a superfamily of armoured harvestmen in the order Opiliones. There are 4 families and around 75 described species in Travunioidea.

== Families ==
These four families belong to the superfamily Travunioidea:

- Cladonychiidae Hadži, 1935
- Cryptomastridae Derkarabetian & Hedin, 2018
- Paranonychidae Briggs, 1971
- Travuniidae Absolon & Kratochvíl, 1932

Also see overview List of Travunioidea

=== incertae sedis ===
- Yuria Suzuki, 1964

- Yuria pulcra Suzuki, 1964

- Yuria pulcra briggsi Suzuki, 1975 – Japan
- Yuria pulcra pulcra Suzuki, 1964 – Japan

† Baltonychia Bartel, Derkarabetian & Dunlop, 2022

† Baltonychia obscura Bartel, Derkarabetian & Dunlop, 2022
