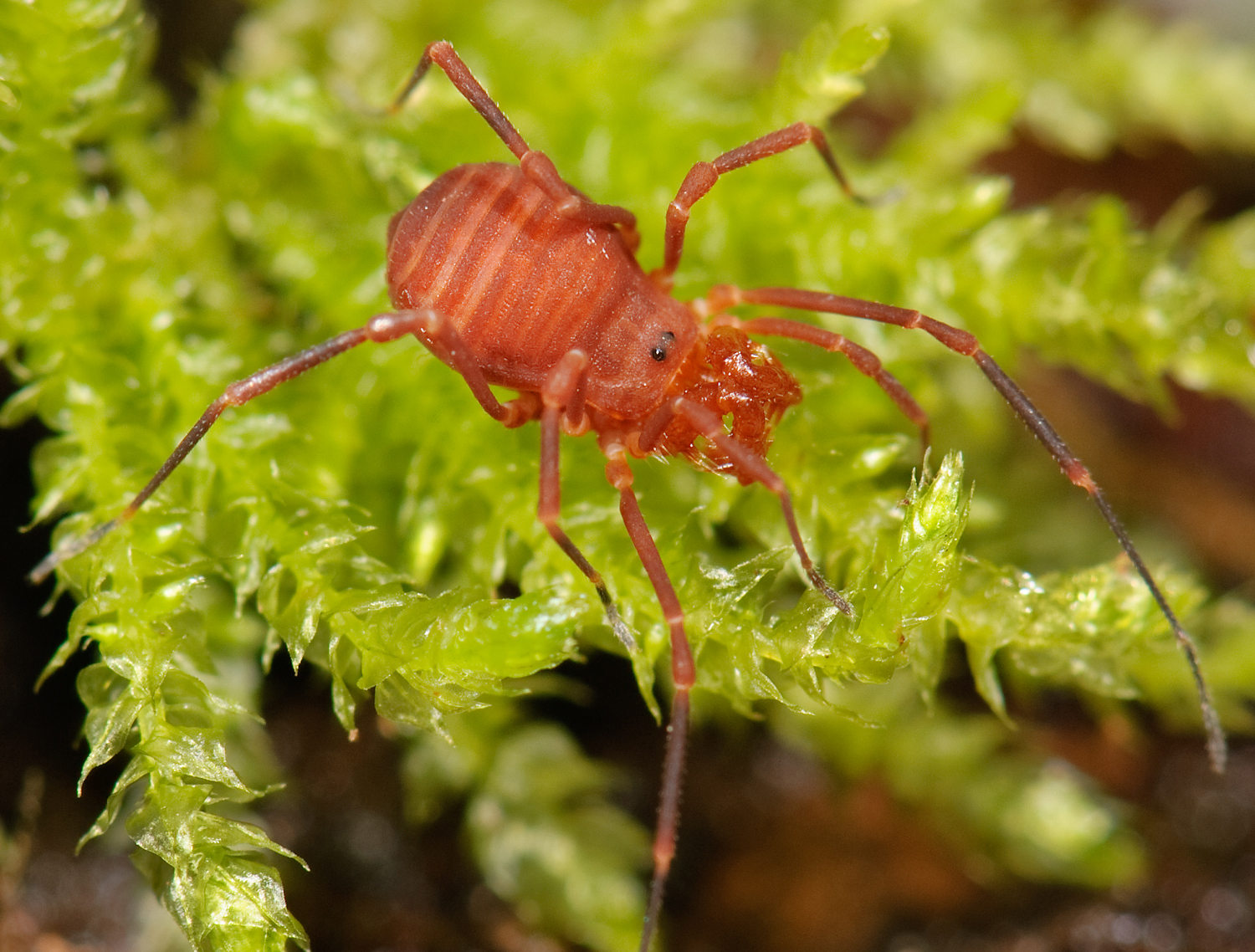
- Sclerobunus nondimorphicus

Scientific classification
- Kingdom: Animalia
- Phylum: Arthropoda
- Subphylum: Chelicerata
- Class: Arachnida
- Order: Opiliones
- Superfamily: Travunioidea
- Family: Paranonychidae; Briggs, 1971

= Paranonychidae =

Family of harvestmen/daddy longlegs

Paranonychidae is a family of armoured harvestmen in the order Opiliones. There are 9 genera and at least 28 described species in Paranonychidae.

== Genera ==
(Also see overview species listing)

- Izunonychus Suzuki, 1975
- Kainonychus Suzuki, 1975
- Kaolinonychus Suzuki, 1975
- Metanippononychus Suzuki, 1975
- Metanonychus Briggs, 1971
- Nippononychus Suzuki, 1975
- Paranonychus Briggs, 1971
- Sclerobunus Banks, 1893
- Zuma Goodnight & Goodnight, 1942
