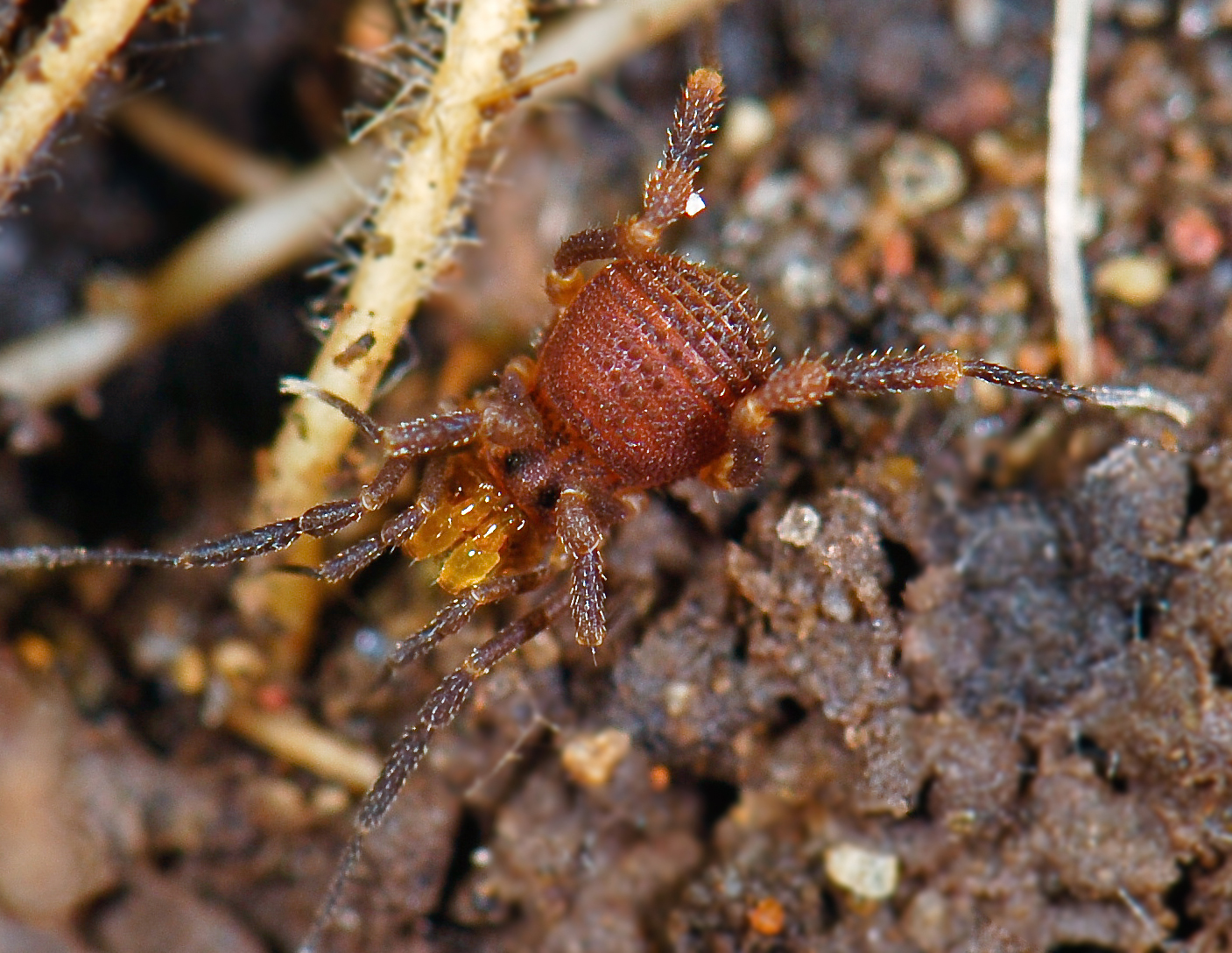
- Pellobunus insularis

Scientific classification
- Kingdom: Animalia
- Phylum: Arthropoda
- Subphylum: Chelicerata
- Class: Arachnida
- Order: Opiliones
- Suborder: Laniatores; Thorell, 1876

Superfamilies
- Travunioidea; Triaenonychoidea; Assamioidea; Epedanoidea; Phalangodoidea; Samooidea; Sandokanoidea; Zalmoxoidea; Gonyleptoidea

= Laniatores =

Laniatores Temporal range: Cretaceous–present

Suborder of harvestmen/daddy longlegs

Laniatores is the largest suborder of the arachnid order Opiliones with over 4,200 described species worldwide. The majority of the species are highly dependent on humid environments and usually correlated with tropical and temperate forest habitats.

Laniatores are typically (relatively) short-legged, hard-plated, spiny Opiliones, common under logs and stones, in leaf litter and in caves. They often have spiny pedipalps and paired or branched claws on the third and fourth pairs of legs. The largest family is Gonyleptidae Sundevall, 1833, endemic of the Neotropics, with over 800 valid species and showing many cases of maternal and paternal care.

== Identification ==
The dorsal scutum consists of a single piece, with the carapace or peltidium entirely fused with abdominal scutum. The pedipalpus is usually robust and armed with strong spines. The ovipositor is short and unsegmented (derived character state shared with the Dyspnoi). The penis is complex, with many sclerites. Some of the sclerites are movable, with a single penial muscle present. For the most part, the penis is without muscles, instead working by hemolymph pressure.

== Subtaxa ==
- Infraorder "Insidiatores" Loman, 1901 (probably diphyletic)
  - Superfamily Travunioidea Absolon & Kratochvil, 1932
  - Superfamily Triaenonychoidea Sørensen, 1886
- Infraorder Grassatores Kury, 2002
  - Superfamily Assamioidea Sørensen, 1884
  - Superfamily Epedanoidea Sørensen, 1886
  - Superfamily Gonyleptoidea Sundevall, 1833
  - Superfamily Phalangodoidea Simon, 1879
  - Superfamily Samooidea Sørensen, 1886
  - Superfamily Sandokanoidea Özdikmen & Kury, 2007
  - Superfamily Zalmoxoidea Sørensen, 1886

Definitions and limits of superfamilies are still in a state of flux. The largest by far is the Gonyleptoidea, with over 2,000 described species.

== Geographic distribution ==
Distribution of subunits of Laniatores is very interesting from the biogeographic point of view. The Travunioidea are typical of northern temperate regions while the Triaenonychoidea make their counterpart in the southern temperate regions. The other superfamilies are tropical, with many noteworthy endemisms and transcontinental relationships.
