= Insidiatores =

Insidiatores Temporal range: Cretaceous–present

Scientific classification
- Domain: Eukaryota
- Kingdom: Animalia
- Phylum: Arthropoda
- Subphylum: Chelicerata
- Class: Arachnida
- Order: Opiliones
- Suborder: Laniatores
- Infraorder: Insidiatores; Loman, 1901

Superfamilies
- See text for list

Order of harvestmen/daddy longlegs

Insidiatores is an infraorder of opilions in the suborder Laniatores. It includes over 500 species distributed mainly in temperate latitudes.

== Superfamilies ==
- Travunioidea Absolon & Kratochvíl, 1932
- Triaenonychoidea Sørensen, 1886
