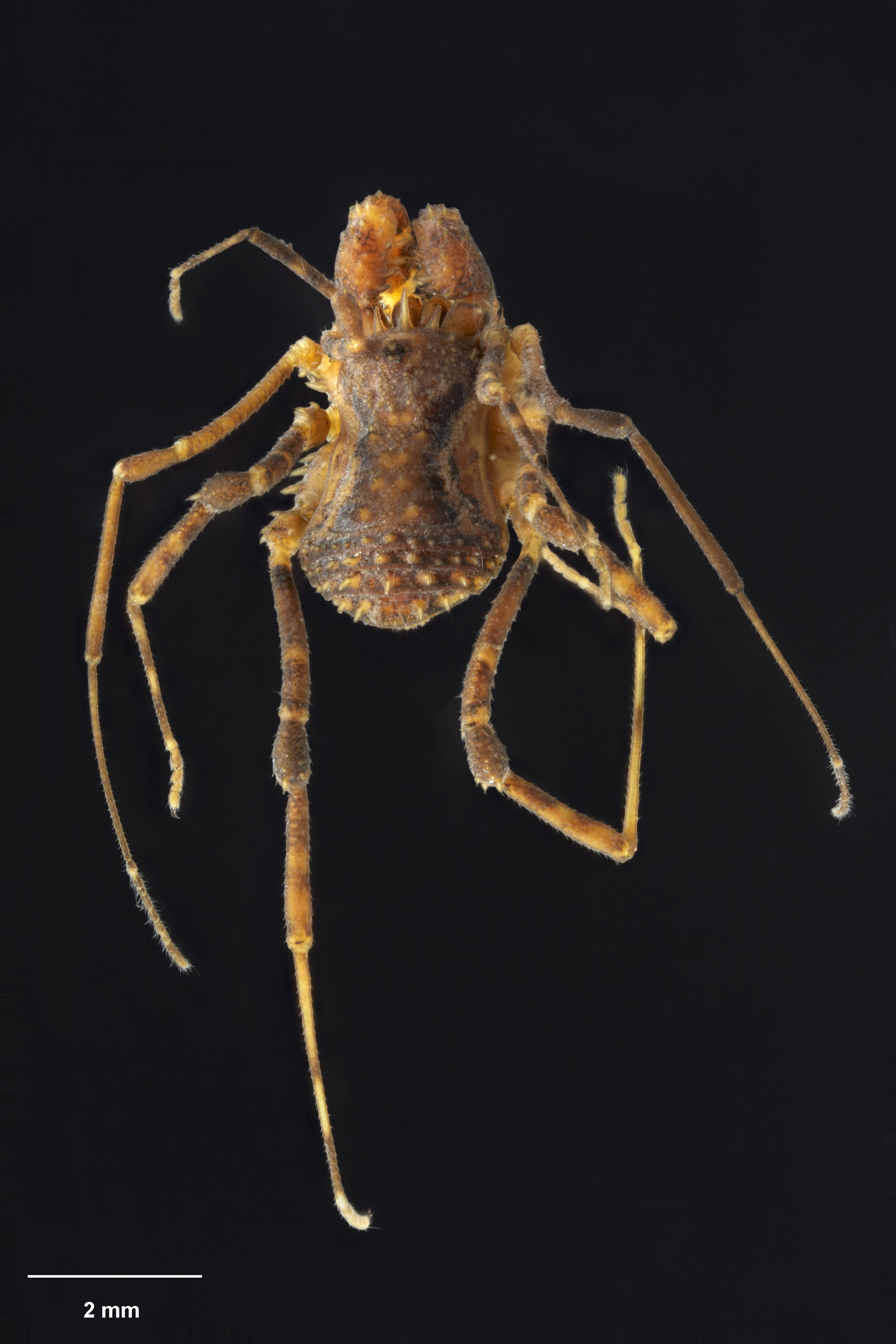
- Holotype male

Scientific classification
- Kingdom: Animalia
- Phylum: Arthropoda
- Subphylum: Chelicerata
- Class: Arachnida
- Order: Opiliones
- Family: Triaenonychidae
- Genus: Algidia
- Species: A. chiltoni
- Subspecies: A. c. oconnori

Trinomial name
- Algidia chiltoni oconnori Forster, 1954

= Algidia chiltoni oconnori =

Species of harvester

Algidia chiltoni oconnori is a subspecies in the genus Algidia in the harvestman family Triaenonychidae. It is found the lower North Island of New Zealand. Only male specimens are known, leading Ray Forster to speculate that it could be a second male form of Algidia chiltoni chiltoni even though male dimorphism (two forms of male) is unknown in Algidia.

== Taxonomy ==
Algidia chiltoni oconnori was described by Ray Forster in 1954 and is a member of the New Zealand endemic genus Algidia in the opilionid (harvestman) family Triaenonychidae. The type specimen is held at Te Papa. Forster speculated that as only male specimens had been found, A. c. oconnori may represent a second male form of Algidia chiltoni. However, Forster also noted that male dimorphism (two forms of male) has not been found in this genus.

== Description ==
This subspecies is only known from males. It has the general characteristics of Algidia and most closely resembles Algidia chiltoni chiltoni and Algidia chiltoni longispinosa. The form of the tubercles (pointed protuberances) on the eyemound allows A. c. oconnori to be separated from both taxa. These are longer than in A. chiltoni but are shorter and more numerous than in A. c. longispinosa.

Males of all three subspecies can also be separated by the nature of the tubercles on the rear margin of the scutum (the unsegmented portion of the carapace) and the free tergites (the segmented rear area). These are thicker in A. c. chiltoni than in the other two subspecies, with A. c. longispinosa having fewer tubercles on the rear margin of the scutum and the first two free tergites than A. c. oconnori.

Additionally, the femur of the pedipalp lacks the proximo-dorsal (upper surface, near the body) swelling with a spinous tubercle seen in males of A. c. chiltoni and A. c. longispinosa, while the tarsus of the second leg has an additional segment.

== Distribution ==
This species is found in the lower North Island of New Zealand, from Wairarapa region in the east across to the western side of the Remutaka Range. It is sympatric within the larger range of Algidia c. chiltoni.

== Conservation status ==
Algiidia chiltoni oconnori has not been assessed under the New Zealand Threat Classification System.
