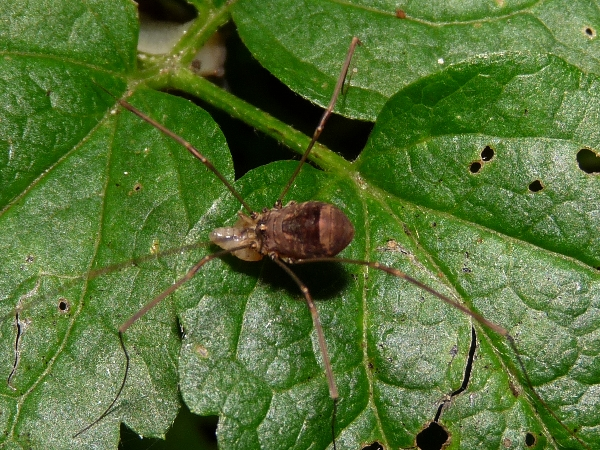

Scientific classification
- Kingdom: Animalia
- Phylum: Arthropoda
- Subphylum: Chelicerata
- Class: Arachnida
- Order: Opiliones
- Family: Sclerosomatidae
- Genus: Leiobunum
- Species: L. blackwalli

Binomial name
- Leiobunum blackwalli Meade, 1861

= Leiobunum blackwalli =

Species of harvestman/daddy longlegs

Leiobunum blackwalli is a species of harvestman. It is found in Europe, but has been introduced to British Columbia in Canada and Seattle in the United States.

== Description ==
Leiobunum blackwalli grows to 6 mm in females and 4 mm in males. The second pair of legs grow to 50mm. Similar in appearance to L. rotundum, the abdomen is broader at the rear and the dark marking broader at the rear than the front with a sharper cutoff than L. rotundum, and the palps are pale.

== Distribution ==
This harvestman is widespread throughout Britain and Europe, though less common than L. rotundum. As at 2023 this species was regarded as newly introduced to British Columbia in Canada and Seattle in the United States.

== Habitat ==
It is usually found in woods or damp places, and also in gardens.
