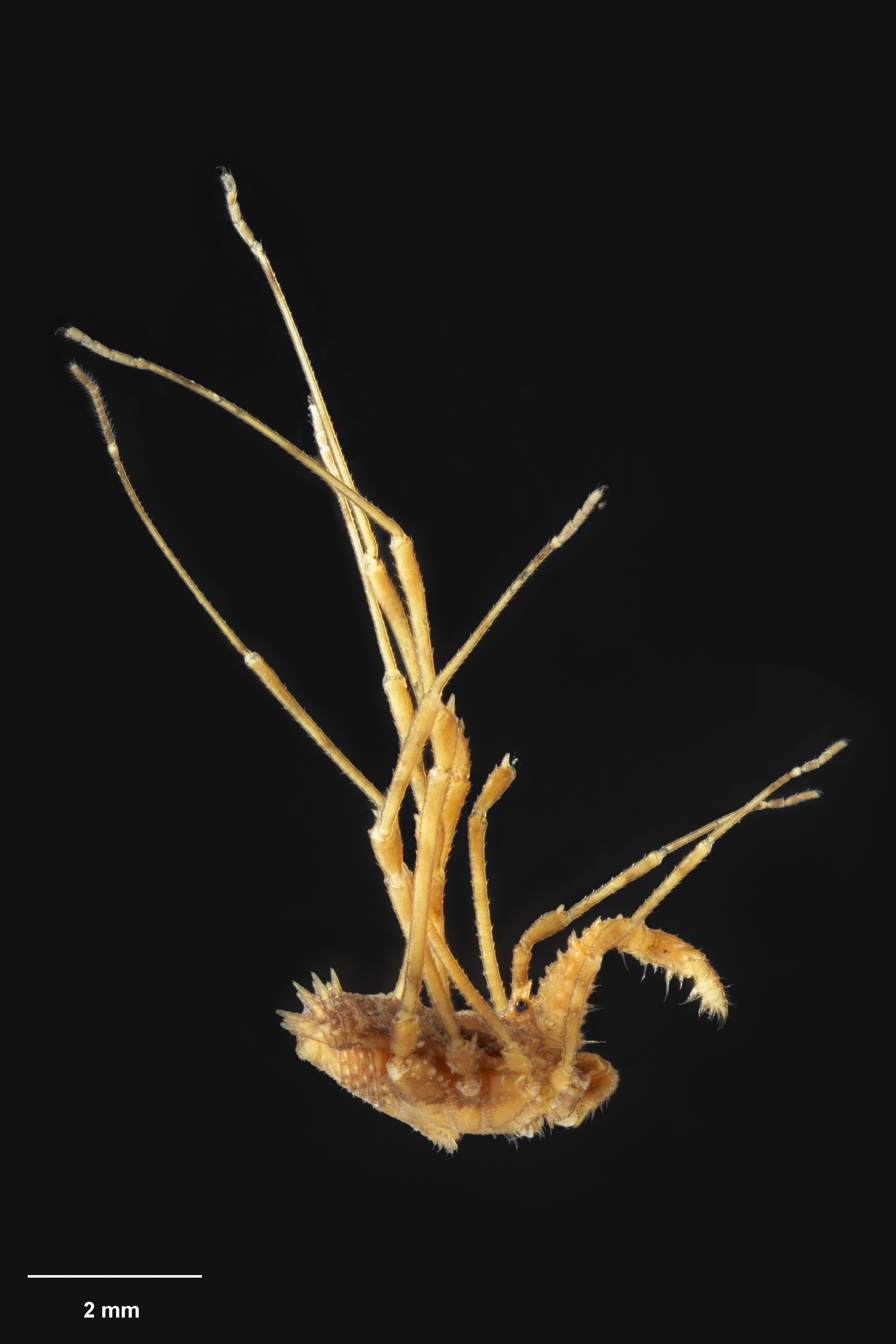
- Holotype male

Scientific classification
- Kingdom: Animalia
- Phylum: Arthropoda
- Subphylum: Chelicerata
- Class: Arachnida
- Order: Opiliones
- Family: Triaenonychidae
- Genus: Algidia
- Species: A. chiltoni
- Subspecies: A. c. longispinosa

Trinomial name
- Algidia chiltoni longispinosa Forster, 1954

= Algidia chiltoni longispinosa =

Species of harvester

Algidia chiltoni longispinosa is a subspecies in the genus Algidia in the harvestman family Triaenonychidae. It is found in the Horowhenua district and Wairarapa region in the lower North Island of New Zealand. Ray Forster placed it as a subspecies of Algiidia chiltoni.

== Taxonomy ==
Algidia chiltoni longispinosa was described by Ray Forster in 1954 and is a member of the New Zealand endemic genus Algidia in the opilionid (harvestman) family Triaenonychidae. The type specimen is held at Te Papa. Forster placed it as subspecies of Algidia chiltoni, noting that "although the distribution is sympatric, there is evidence of interbreeding between these two forms in the Levin [Horowhenua] district".

== Description ==
This subspecies has the general characteristics of Algidia and most closely resembles Algidia chiltoni chiltoni and Algidia chiltoni oconnori. The tubercles (pointed protuberances) on the eyemound of A. c. longispinosa males are longer and fewer than in either of these taxa.

Males can also be separated by the nature of the tubercles on the rear margin of the scutum (the unsegmented portion of the carapace) and the free tergites (the segmented rear area). These are thicker in A. c. chiltoni than in the other two subspecies, with A. c. longispinosa having fewer tubercles on the rear margin of the scutum and the first two free tergites than A. c. oconnori.

The femur of the male pedipalp has a proximo-dorsal (upper surface, near the body) swelling with a spinous tubercle similar to A. c. chiltoni, but not present in A. c. oconnori. However, the dorsal tubercles are longer, while the ventral tubercles are both longer and more numerous than in A. c. chiltoni. The female pedipalp shares these two characteristics, allowing them to be distinguished from females of A. c. chiltoni (with females of A. c. oconnori unknown).

== Distribution ==
This species is recorded from Levin (Horowhenua district) and the Wairarapa region in the lower North Island of New Zealand. It is sympatric within the larger range of Algidia c. chiltoni.

== Conservation status ==
Algiidia chiltoni oconnori has not been assessed under the New Zealand Threat Classification System.
