= Opiliones anatomy =

Physiology of harvestmen (order Opiliones)

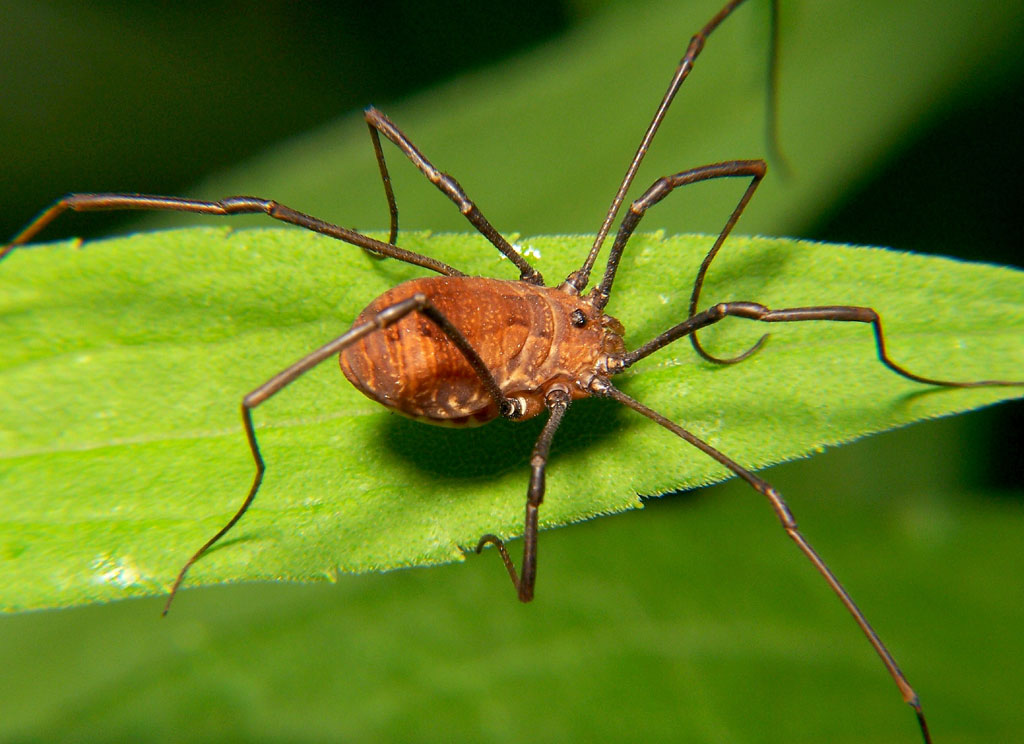
Hadrobunus grandis

Opiliones (commonly known as harvestmen) are an order of arachnids and share many common characteristics with other arachnids. However, several differences separate harvestmen from other arachnid orders such as spiders. The bodies of opiliones are divided into two tagmata (arthropod body regions): the abdomen (opisthosoma) and the cephalothorax (prosoma). Unlike spiders, the juncture between the abdomen and cephalothorax is often poorly defined. Harvestmen have chelicerae, pedipalps and four pairs of legs. Harvestmen were traditionally thought to have two eyes, except in the case of eyeless species. Developmental genetic work has shown that living species retain up to six eyes, including one pair of rudimentary median eyes and one pair of rudimentary lateral eyes (homologous to the facetted eyes of insects and horseshoe crabs).

== Prosoma ==
The frontal portion of the body contains the main part of the centralized nervous system, the feeding organs, defensive glands, and the legs. The upper side is covered by a sclerotized carapace, which is formed by the fused tergites of the six appendage-bearing somites. The feeding apparatus is called the stomotheca. It is formed by extensions from the pedipalps and the first leg pair. The ocularium, an elevated mound placed in the middle of the carapace, usually contains two simple eyes. Some species lack eyes. The prosoma can be smooth or armed with spines. In some members of the suborder Dyspnoi, the eyes are located on projections that form a hood covering the mouthparts.

On the sides of the prosoma there are defensive glands called ozopores, which in Cyphophthalmi open on the tip of an elevated cone called the ozophore. The prosomal muscles attach to the endosternite. The endosternite is a horizontal cartilage like sheet of connective tissue that acts as an internal skeleton. In some harvestmen (Phalangium, Odiellus and Leiobunum) it contains calcium deposits. The endosternite is U-shaped with the arms facing forward and embracing the ganglion above the esophagus.

=== Chelicerae ===
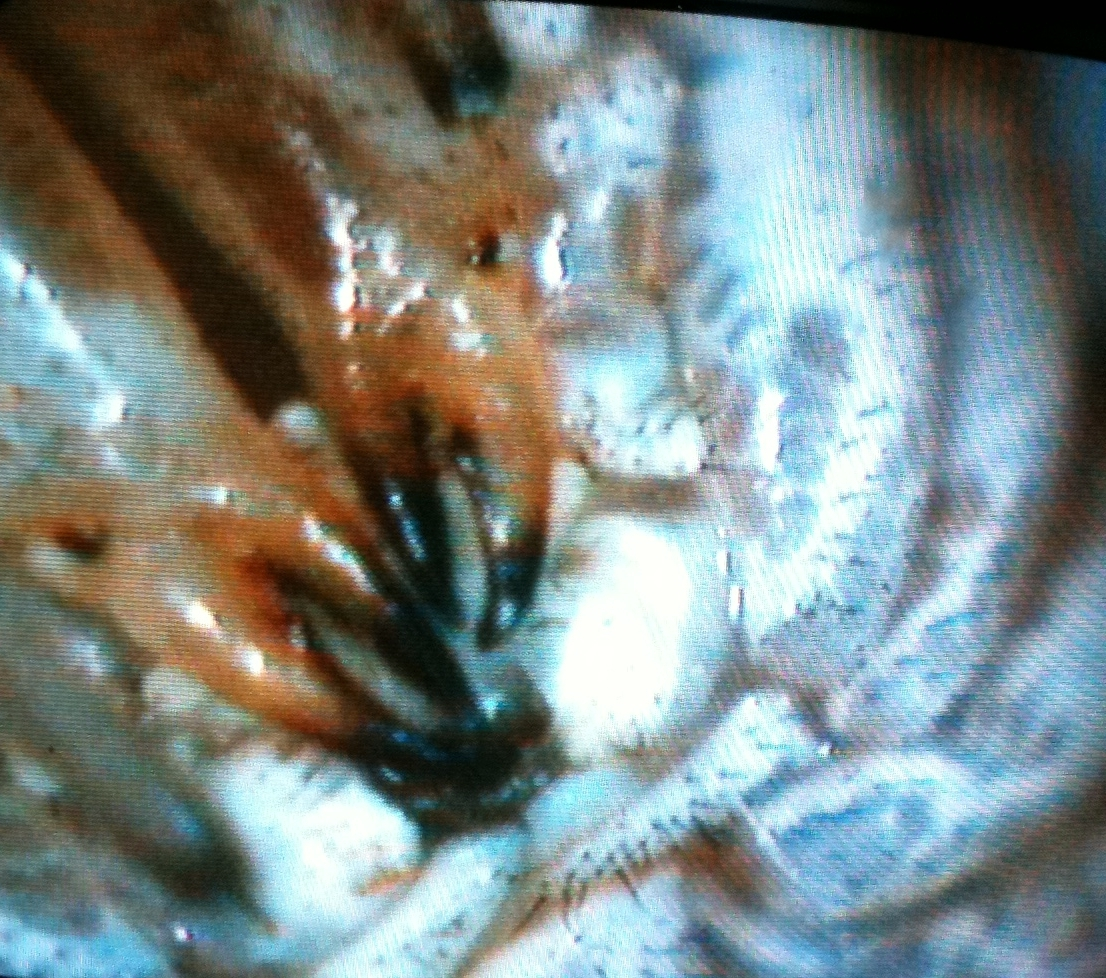
Close-up of the chelicerae of a harvestman

The chelicerae consist of three segments, with the distal two forming a pincer equipped with a row of teeth. Based on developmental gene expression data, the proximal segment is thought to be homologous to the femur and patella of the legs, the middle segment to the tibia through the tarsus of the legs, and the distal segment to the apotele (the claw with its modifications). Functional genetic data have shown that knockdown of the transcription factor dachshund transforms the three-segmented chelicera into the two-segmented variant found in groups like pseudoscorpions and solifuges.

=== Pedipalps ===
The pedipalps are used as tactile organs, for grasping food, and mating. In predatory species the pedipalps are often enlarged and spiny. Some harvestmen do not have claws, while others (e.g. many Laniatores) may have sickle-like claws. Harvestmen pedipalps are anatomically laid out like the legs, the difference being that the proximal metatarsus and distal tarsus are merged, and simply called tarsus. Pedipalpal identity is conferred by the Hox gene labial; reducing the expression of this gene transforms pedipalps into chelicerae.

=== Legs ===
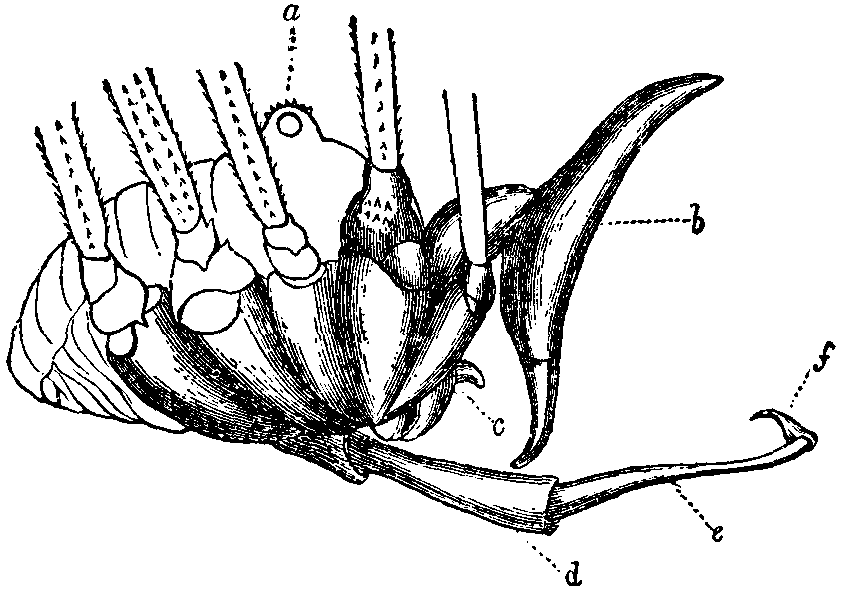
Phalangium cornutum, profile of male, with legs and palpi truncated. a: ocular tubercle; b: mandible; c: labrum; d: sheath of penis protruded; e: penis; f: glans

The legs consist of coxa, trochanter, femur, patella, tibia, metatarsus, tarsus and claw. In most Eupnoi and many Dyspnoi the coxae are freely movable, while in others they are fused together and immovably attached to the underside of the body. In contrast to spiders, hydraulic pressure does not play a significant role in leg movement. However, a flexed leg of Leiobunum can return 80% in extension. This springlike property is a due to elastic sclerites that span across the joints. The elasticity may be due to resilin in the sclerites.

While the metatarsus is undivided, the tarsus can consist of three to over one hundred tarsomeres. In most Cyphophthalmi the tarsus is entirely undivided. Many long-legged forms in the superfamily Phalangioidea can wrap their tarsi two or three times around twigs. Nevertheless, the tarsi contain no muscles, but only tendons of the claw muscles. These muscles originate in the patella, tibia and metatarsus. Most harvestman legs have only one claw, but in Grassatores, the later two pairs of legs end in two claws, where an additional structure can even give the appearance of three claws.

Nymphal stages of Grassatores and some Insidiatores feature additional structures on the latter two pairs of tarsi, which probably allow adhesion to smooth surfaces during molting, as they are not present in adults.

Legs of Eupnoi and many long-legged Dyspnoi are weak at the base of the femora. When legs are trapped or caught by a predator, these harvestman can detach the restrained leg by a powerful movement of the coxa-trochanter joint. The detached legs of Phalangioidea can twitch for several minutes, with oxygen provided by spiracles in the tibia. The pacemaker neurons responsible for this become active when they lose the connection to the central nervous system. Each of the two twitching leg joints contains an independent pacemaker. Even immature harvestmen cannot regenerate lost legs.

One reason for the hanging stance characteristic for long-legged harvestmen seems to be enhanced stability on exposed surfaces, for example against wind. Leiobunum vittatum (and probably other harvestmen) walks by lifting the "central" (counting the second pair as antennae) leg of one side and the outer legs of the other side forward while the other three rest on the ground (alternating tripod gait, similar to that of insects).

Genetic identity of the anterior two leg pairs is conferred by the Hox gene Deformed; knockdown of this gene causes a transformation of the first two leg pairs into palps. The third leg identity is conferred jointly by Deformed and Sex combs reduced.

== Opisthosoma ==
The hind part of the body, the opisthosoma, consists of ten somites. The last tergite (anal operculum) lacks a corresponding sternite, comparable to the telson of horseshoe crabs, scorpions and whip scorpions. The muscles of the opisthosoma mostly seem to regulate the volume and internal pressure of the body fluid. The openings of the respiratory system, the spiracles or stigmata, are located on the sides of the second somite. While the genital opening, the gonopore, derives from the second opisthosomal somite in all arachnids, it is displaced between the fourth pair of legs in harvestmen, thus appearing to be part of the prosoma. The ovipositor of females or penis of males is withdrawn into the first opisthosomal somite.

== Digestion ==
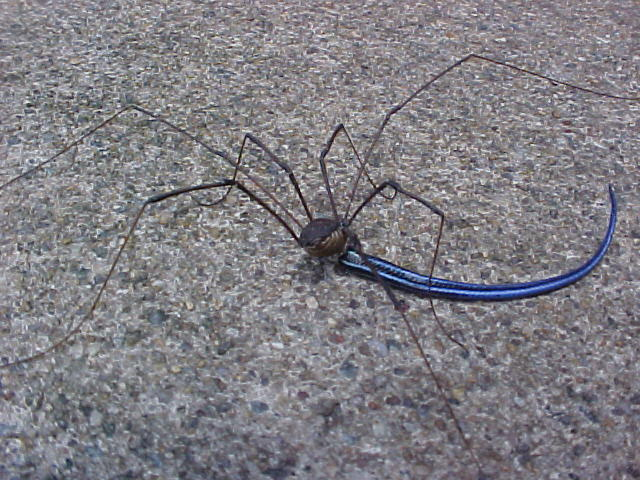
Harvestman eating a skink tail

The foregut (stomodeum) develops from the ectoderm. It is called pharynx before passing through the central nervous system, and esophagus inside the CNS. Shortly afterwards it empties into the midgut.

The midgut (mesenteron) is the largest organ in harvestmen and fills most of the opisthosoma. Like in other arthropods it is derived from the endoderm. Unlike the fore- and hindgut, which are derived from ectoderm, it has no cuticular lining. The midgut is surrounded by muscle cells, tracheae and intermediate tissue, which does not form a fat body like in scorpions and solifuges. The epithelial cells of the midgut are often infected by rickettsia-like parasites, like in some other arachnids. Resorptive cells, which may be unique to harvestmen, contain lipid droplets, glycogen and mineral spherites. These spherites are also common in many arachnids. They seem to function in heavy metal excretion and mineral storage. Overwintering juveniles store calcium and phosphates in it for molting. Silicon is present throughout the life, but decreases with age, as does the number of spherites.

The hindgut is a short invagination of the ectoderm, linking the midgut to the anus. It can be dilated and shortened by muscles.

== Circulation ==
Unlike arachnids with book lungs (scorpions, most spiders and several others), harvestmen and most other purely tracheate arachnids lack extensive arterial branching and well-defined venous sinuses. The circulatory system consists mainly of a dorsal tubular heart with anterior and posterior aortae. The heart is innervated by a cardiac ganglion. Myofibrils are mostly arranged circularly and constrict the heart during systole. There are two valves present, an anterior valve, extending into the anterior aorta seems to prevent backflow of hemolymph, and a posterior valve, which is possibly actively controlled.

Five types of blood cells have been found, none of which are unique to harvestmen. Prohemocytes are about five μm in diameter and rather scarce. They probably act as stem cells to the amoeboid plasmatocytes, which are about 11 μm and are known to ingest bacteria and dead cells. Granulocytes apparently develop from plasmatocytes and are also amoeboid, although no phagocytosis has been observed. They may act as storage cells. Spherulocytes are up to 15 μm long seem to be non-motile. They contain many spherules, whose composition changes over time, but the function is not known. Coagulocytes, which probably derived from granulocytes, release granules and disintegrate when they come in contact with uncleaned surfaces in vitro, probably due to present bacterial endotoxins. Despite their name, these cells seem not to play a role in hemolymph coagulation.

== Respiration ==
Harvestmen breathe through tracheae, somewhat like insects. Air enters through a pair of spiracles located behind the last pair of legs, on the opisthosoma. Unlike as in insects, the tracheae end in hemolymph near the organs, instead of leading into them. The oxygen-binding respiratory pigment of harvestmen is hemocyanin, which is typically found in arachnids with book lungs, which harvestmen do not possess. The pattern of tracheal branching seems to be rather consistent in all harvestmen. A main trunk projects upward and forward from each spiracle into the prosoma, where it narrows gradually until it ends in the chelicerae of each side. Lateral branches lead to the other appendages. Except in Cyphophthalmi, the branches from each side meet and form a single transverse trachea. Gonad, genitalia and digestive tract also receive branches.

Phalangioidea have additional spiracles on the tibiae of the pedipalps and legs, thus helping in gas exchange in the long legs. They also provide a severed leg with oxygen, allowing it to continue twitching for some time: a leg of Opilio twitched for about 23 minutes, but stopped after about 40 seconds when the spiracles were sealed.

== Nervous system ==
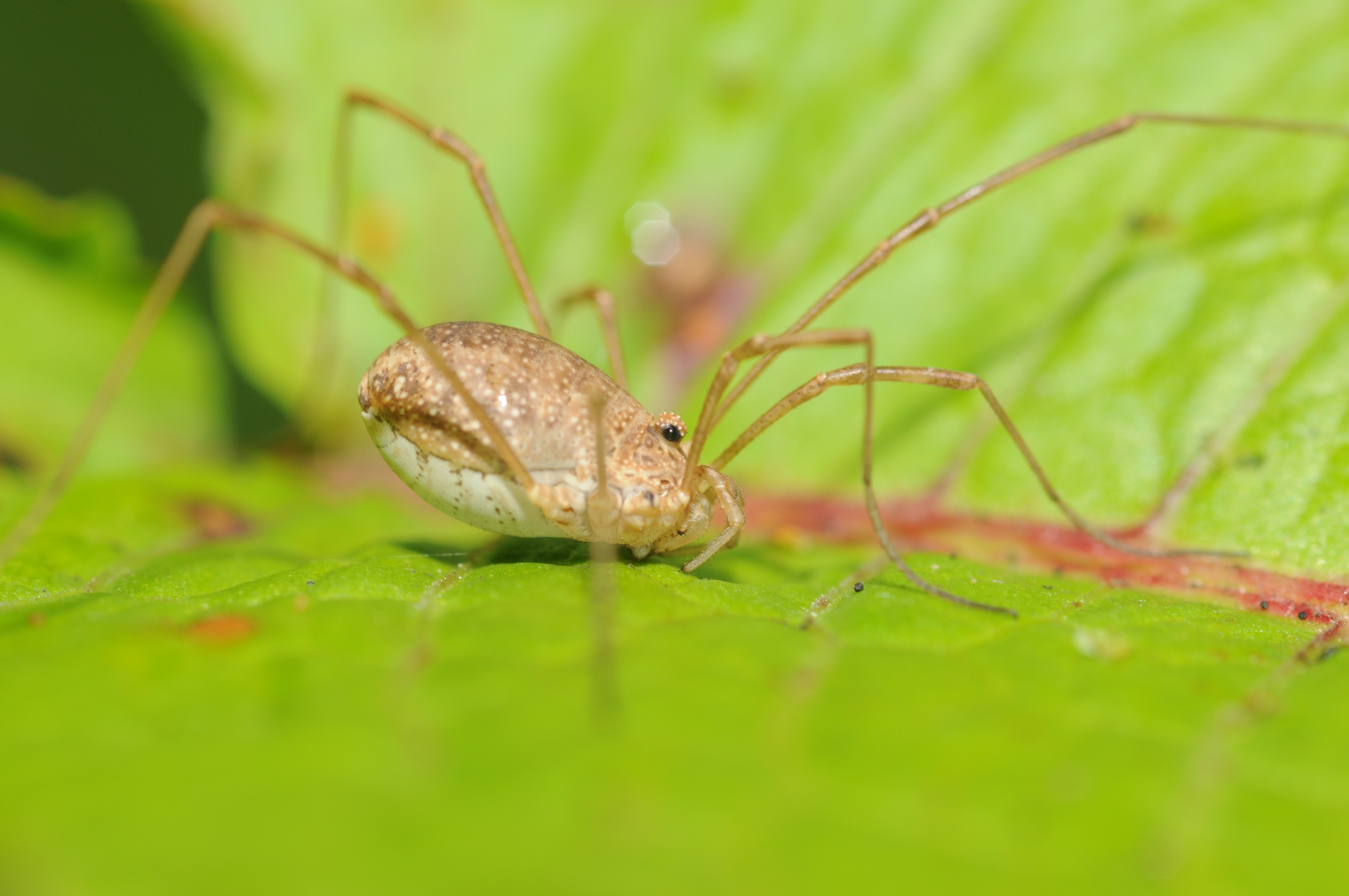
The eyes of harvestmen are often placed close together on a small tubercle.

The central nervous system of harvestmen, which evolved from a segmented structure, is centralized around the esophagus. The part above the esophagus (syncerebrum) consists of protocerebrum (associated with the eyes) and deutocerebrum (associated with the chelicerae). The nerves of the pedipalp, walking legs, and some for the opisthosoma emerge from the part below the esophagus. The peripheral nervous system is not well studied.

=== Eyes ===
When present, most living harvestmen have a single pair of camera-type eyes, which can occur in different positions on the anterior prosoma. In Cyphophthalmi, eyes typically occur in members of the families Pettalidae and Stylocellidae on the sides of the head, in association with dorsolateral projections called ozophores. In Phalangida (the remaining harvestmen), eyes typically occur on a median cuticular projection called the ocularium.

Arachnids feature two kinds of visual systems: lateral and median. The former, which evolved from compound eyes, were thought to be absent in harvestmen, until their recent discovery in embryos of the daddy longlegs Phalangium opilio and the emerald armored harvestman Iporangaia pustulosa. In addition, Phalangium opilio exhibits a second rudimentary pair of median eyes, homologs of which occur only in sea spiders and horseshoe crabs.

Many cave- or soil-dwelling species, including most Cyphophthalmi, lack eyes, or they are reduced. Several otherwise blind Cyphophthalmi have small photoreceptors at the base of the ozophores, but it is unclear whether these are derived from lateral or median ocelli. The size and complexity of eyes in harvestmen roughly correlates with the amount of light available in its habitat. Evolutionary reduction of eyes appears to be caused by the early termination of eye development (paedomorphosis) in most species. Adults of those species thus have eyes that resemble embryonic or juvenile forms of their ancestors. However, Ischyropsalis strandi (Ischyropsalididae) nymphal stages have small but complete eyes, but these get partially lost through a degenerative process in adults.

== Reproduction ==
The basic structure of the reproductive tract is similar in both sexes, with a mesodermal gonoduct (sperm duct or oviduct) emerging from both sides of the U-shaped gonad (testis or ovary). The two gonoducts fuse into a single duct, which leads into a cuticle-lined duct derived from the ectoderm into the open through an organ (penis in males or ovipositor in females) that can be everted through a combination of muscles and hemolymph pressure. These eversible organs play an important role in determining taxonomic relationships.

The penis is often complex, consisting of a long shaft and a shorter glans at the end, which is often equipped with various projections such as spines. In many species muscles move the glans relative to the shaft, but in Grassatores these muscles are lacking, and the movement is achieved purely by hydraulic means. A muscular propulsive organ, which pushes the ejaculate out, is missing in Cyphophthalmi, which have very short penises. The ovipositor is originally segmented and long, but has been reduced in several groups.
