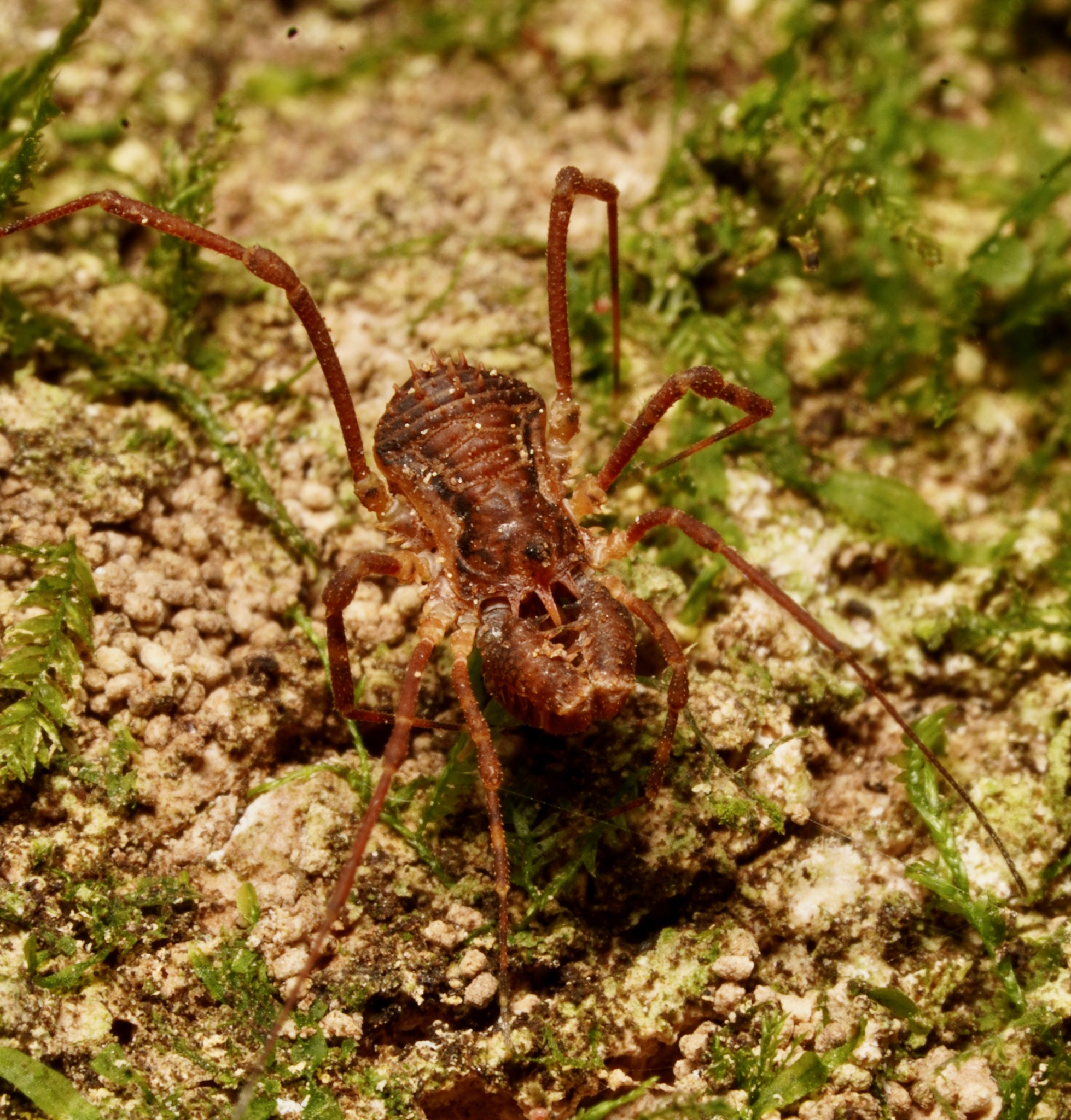
- Algidia chiltoni chiltoni specimen from Turitea, New Zealand
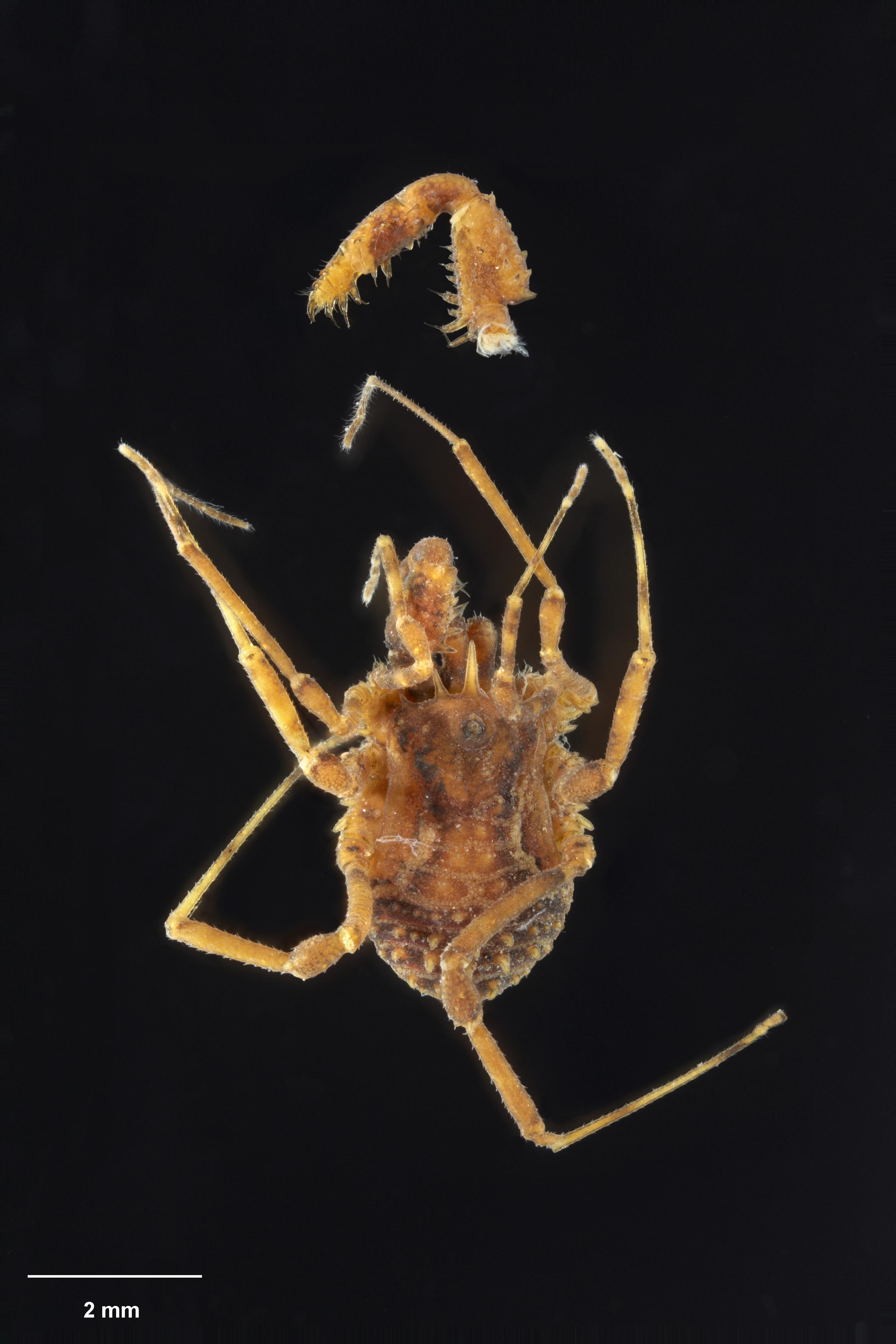
- Holotype of Adaeum hoggi, synonym of Algidia chiltoni

Scientific classification
- Kingdom: Animalia
- Phylum: Arthropoda
- Subphylum: Chelicerata
- Class: Arachnida
- Order: Opiliones
- Family: Triaenonychidae
- Genus: Algidia
- Species: A. chiltoni

Binomial name
- Algidia chiltoni Roewer, 1931

Synonyms
- Algidia cuspidata Hogg, 1920 (part); Adaeum hoggi Forster, 1943

= Algidia chiltoni =

Species of harvester

Algidia chiltoni is a species in the genus Algidia in the harvestman family Triaenonychidae. Endemic to New Zealand, the species is found in most of the North Island as far north as Auckland and in the north-western part of the South Island. Carl Fredrich Roewer described this species in 1931 after realising the females in the type material of Algidia cuspidata Hogg, 1923 were a separate species. Ray Forster revised the genus Algidia in 1954, redescribing Algidia chiltoni and describing two new subspecies.

== Taxonomy ==
Algidia chiltoni was described by Carl Friedrich Roewer in 1931 for females from the type series of Algidia cuspidata Hogg, 1920, which he realised were a different species from the males. It is named after the collector, zoologist Charles Chilton.

It is a member of the New Zealand endemic genus Algidia in the opilionid (harvestman) family Triaenonychidae. As part of his taxonomic revision of Algidia, Ray Forster synonymised Adaeum hoggi Forster, 1943. He also described two subspecies: Algidia chiltoni longispinosa Forster, 1954 and Algidia chiltoni oconnori Forster, 1954. As the first described taxon when these subspecies were erected, the nominate subspecies name for Algidia chiltoni is Algidia chiltoni chiltoni.

The type specimen of A. chiltoni is held at the Natural History Museum, London, while the type of Adaeum hoggi and both of Forster's subspecies are held at Te Papa.

Forster redescribed this species in 1954 and observed that while his description was in accord with Roewer's, he had doubts about Roewer's choice of type specimen as it was collected from Canterbury and he himself never saw any South Island specimens from there.

== Description ==
Algidia chiltoni chiltoni has the general characteristics of Algidia but most closely resembles A. c. longspinosa and A. c. oconnori. The tubercles (pointed protuberances) on the eyemound of A. c.chiltoni males are shorter and more numerous than those found in A. c. longispinosa and shorter and less numerous than those of A. c. occonori. Males can also be separated by the nature of the tubercles on the rear margin of the scutum (the unsegmented portion of the carapace) and the free tergites (the segmented rear area). These are thicker in A. c. chiltoni than in the other two subspecies, with A. c. longispinosa having fewer tubercles on the rear margin of the scutum and the first two free tergites than A. c. oconnori.

The femur of the male pedipalp has a proximo-dorsal (upper surface, near the body) swelling with a spinous tubercle similar to A. c. longispinosa, but not present in A. c. oconnori. However, the dorsal tubercles are shorter, while the ventral tubercles are both shorter and less numerous than in A. c. longispinosa. The female pedipalp shares these two characteristics, allowing them to be distinguished from females of A. c. longispinosa (with females of A. c. oconnori unknown).

== Distribution ==
Algidia chiltoni chiltoni is found as far north as Auckland in the North Island, Stephens Island at the northern tip of the Marlborough Sounds, and in the Tasman region and northernmost part of the West Coast region of the South Island. It is sympatric with both A. c. longispinosa and A. c. oconnori.

== Conservation status ==
Algiidia chiltoni has not been assessed under the New Zealand Threat Classification System.
