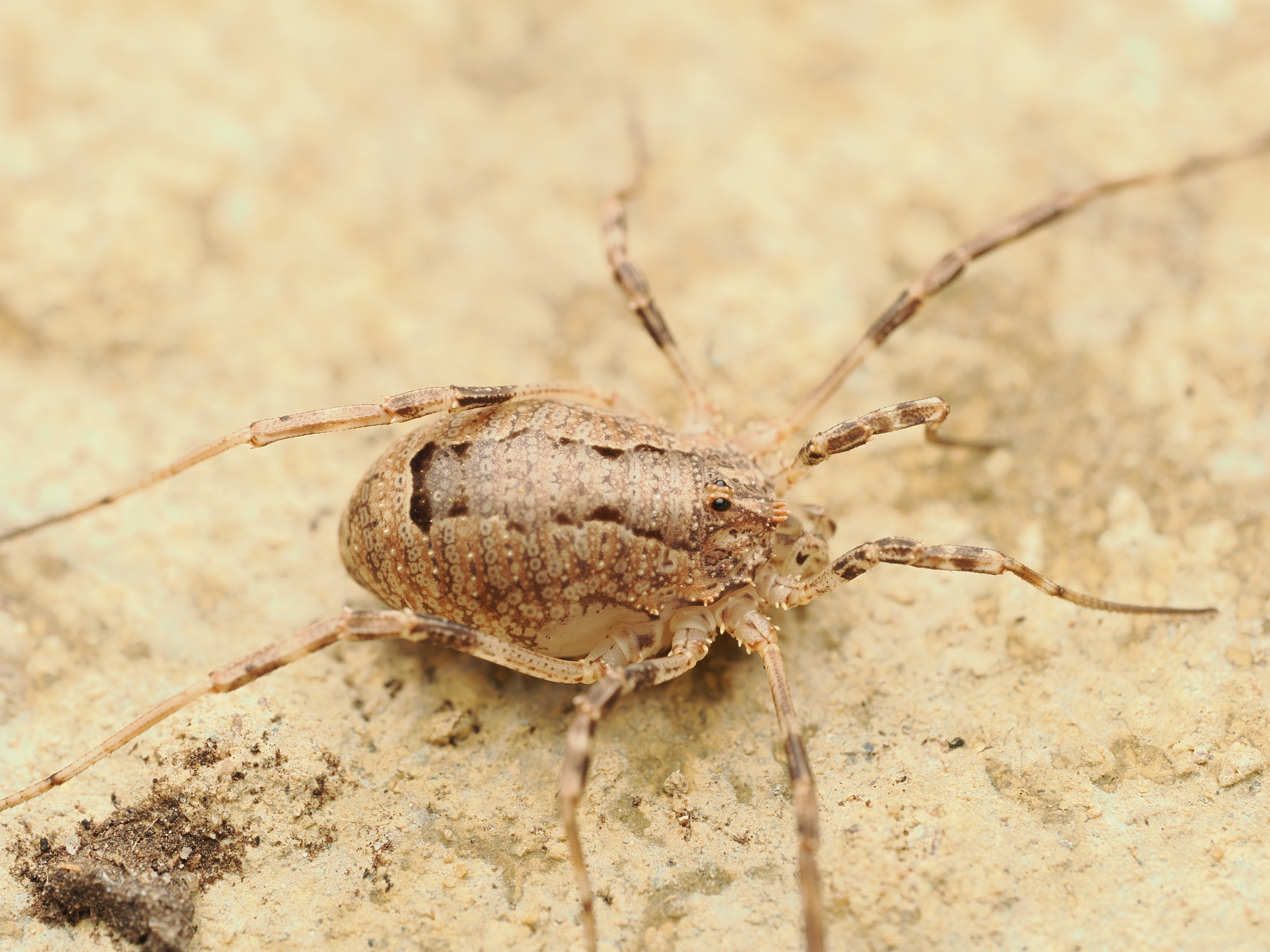

Scientific classification
- Domain: Eukaryota
- Kingdom: Animalia
- Phylum: Arthropoda
- Subphylum: Chelicerata
- Class: Arachnida
- Order: Opiliones
- Family: Phalangiidae
- Genus: Odiellus
- Species: O. spinosus

Binomial name
- Odiellus spinosus (Bosc, 1792)

Synonyms
- Phalangium spinosus Bosc, 1792

= Odiellus spinosus =

Species of harvestman/daddy longlegs

Odiellus spinosus is a species of harvestmen in the family Phalangiidae.

== Description ==
Odiellus spinosus can reach a body length of 6.5–8 millimetres (0.26–0.31 in) in males, of 7–11 millimetres (0.28–0.43 in) in females. This harvestmen shows three large, almost flat spines (hence the species name) in front of the eyes and a black-edged saddle on the back. Moreover the abdomen is distinctly flattened, with some rows of brown spots across each tergite.

== Biology ==
Adults can be found from June and until December.
