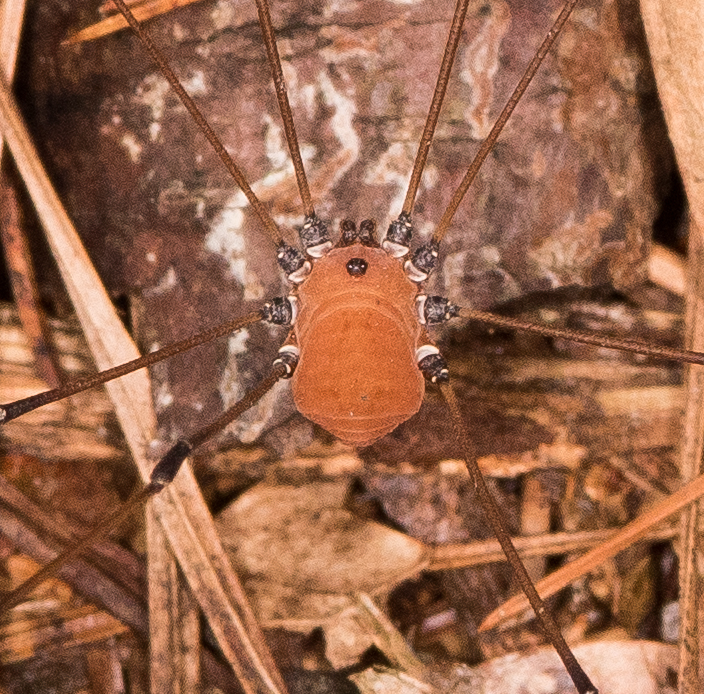

Scientific classification
- Kingdom: Animalia
- Phylum: Arthropoda
- Subphylum: Chelicerata
- Class: Arachnida
- Order: Opiliones
- Family: Sclerosomatidae
- Genus: Leiobunum
- Species: L. verrucosum

Binomial name
- Leiobunum verrucosum (Wood, 1868)

Synonyms
- Leiobunum nigripes Weed, 1892

= Leiobunum verrucosum =

Species of harvestman/daddy longlegs

Leiobunum verrucosum, common name Warty Harvestman, is a species of harvestman in the family Sclerosomatidae. It is found in North America.

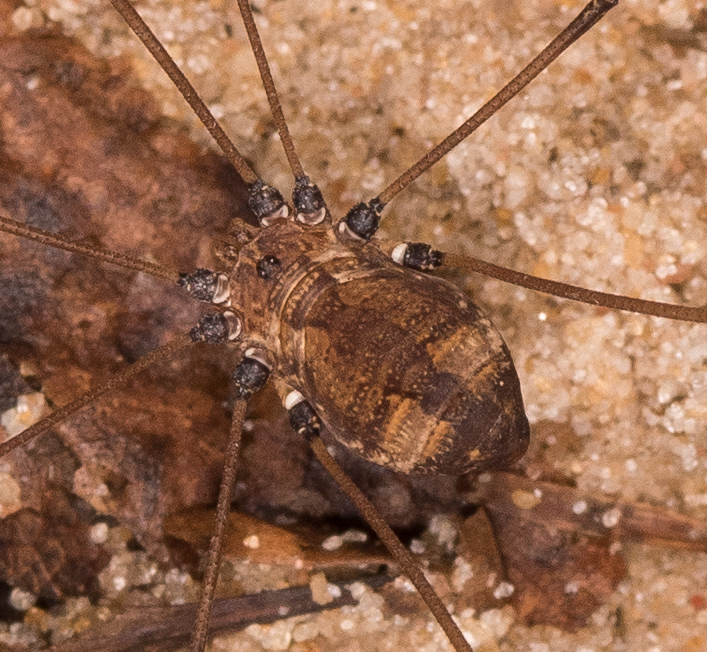
