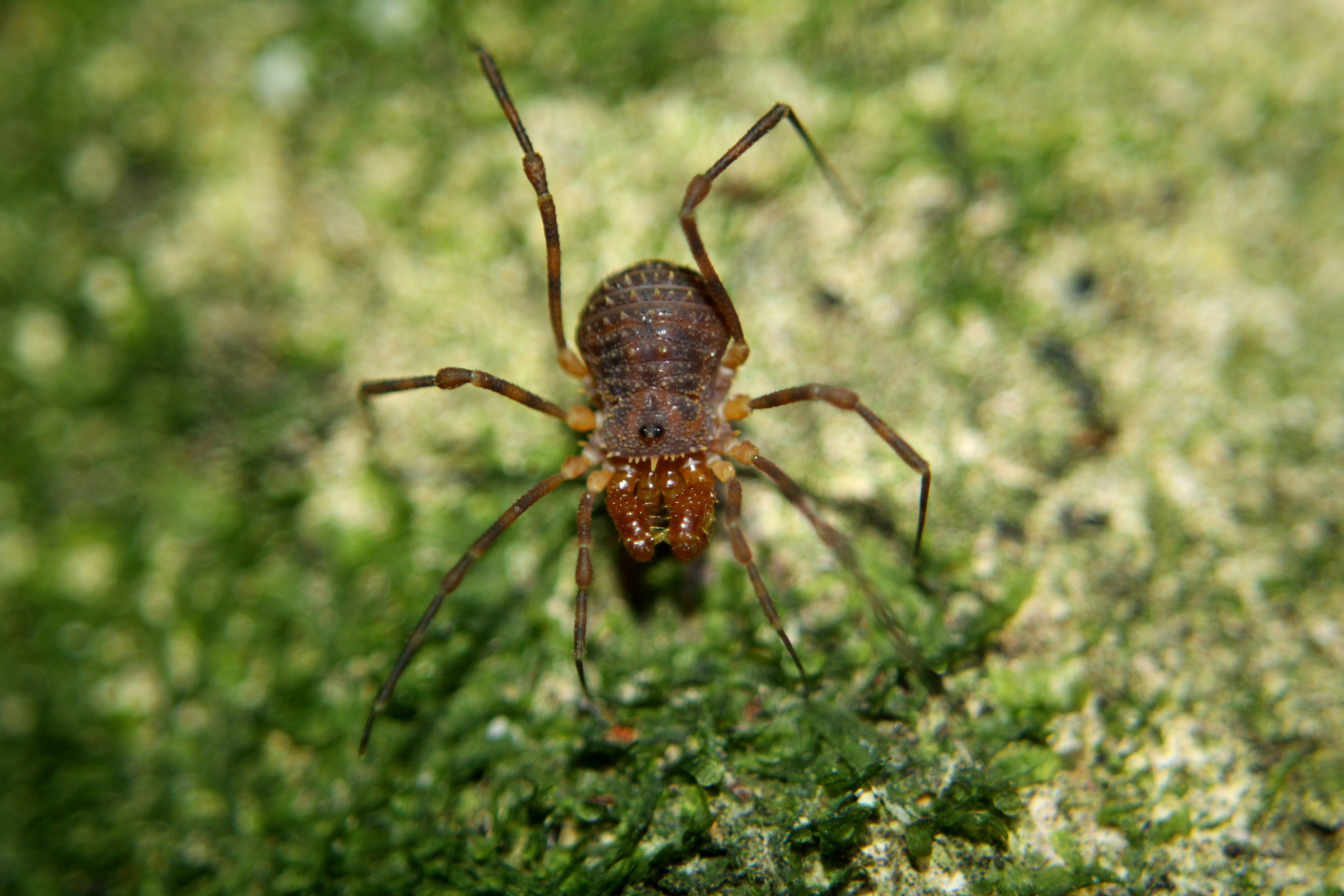
- Algidia sp,

Scientific classification
- Kingdom: Animalia
- Phylum: Arthropoda
- Subphylum: Chelicerata
- Class: Arachnida
- Order: Opiliones
- Family: Triaenonychidae
- Genus: Algidia; Hogg, 1920

Species
- See text.

= Algidia =

Genus of harvester

Algidia is a genus in the harvestman family Triaenonychidae. It is endemic to New Zealand and currently includes 7 species and several subspecies.

== Taxonomy ==
The genus Algidia was erected by Henry R. Hogg in 1920. The type species is Algidia cuspidata Hogg, 1920. Ray Forster initially considered Algidia to be a synonym of Adaeum but re-established Algidia when he revised the genus in his 1954 monograph on the New Zealand Laniatores.

The genus Algidia contains the following species and subspecies:

- Algidia chiltoni Roewer, 1931
  - Algidia chiltoni chiltoni Roewer, 1931
  - Algidia chiltoni longispinosa Forster, 1954
  - Algidia chiltoni oconnori Forster, 1954
- Algidia cuspidata Hogg, 1920 — type species
  - Algidia cuspidata cuspidata Hogg, 1920
  - Algidia cuspidata multispinosa Forster, 1954
- Algidia homerica Forster, 1954
- Algidia interrupta Forster, 1954
  - Algidia interrupta interrupta Forster, 1954
  - Algidia interrupta solatia Forster, 1954
- Algidia marplesi Forster, 1954
- Algidia nigriflavum (Loman, 1902)
- Algidia viridata Forster, 1954
  - Algidia viridata bicolor Forster, 1954
  - Algidia viridata viridata Forster, 1954

Forster's revision includes a key to these taxa. Forster also incorporated this information in a larger key to New Zealand Opiliones published in two parts.

A 2025 phylogenetic analysis suggests there are four undescribed species.

== General appearance ==
Algidia has a row of prominent tubercles (cone-shaped protuberances) on the forward edge of the carapace. The eyemound (a raised, rounded structure with two eyes) bears several pustules (small, rounded protuberances) or small tubercles and is located a distance of approximately its own width behind the forward edge of the carapace. The dorsal (upper) surface has an open pattern of small pustules. This pattern is more complex in females. The free tergites (the rearmost segments) each have a row of strong tubercles. Pedipalps are larger in males than females. Colouring is typically in shades of brown, often with black markings. Algidia viridata and A. v. bicolor are exceptions as they are predominantly green.

== Geographic range ==
Forster's 1954 revision recorded specimens from Auckland in the northern North Island to Fiordland in the lower South Island. More recent observations have expanded the range to Northland and the Chatham Islands.

== Phylogeny ==
Molecular studies using Sanger and ultra conserved element sequencing showed Algidia is part of a clade that includes the majority of New Zealand triaenonychid genera, as well as several genera from Australia, New Caledonia and South America. Algidia appears to have diverged from other genera during the Cretaceous or early Tertiary period. It is most closely related to Prasma and Triregia from New Zealand, and Diaenobunus and Triconobunus from New Caledonia.

A 2025 study shows that geological events including the formation of the Southern Alps, the Oligocene Marine Transgression and glaciation have influenced diversity and species distributions within this genus.
