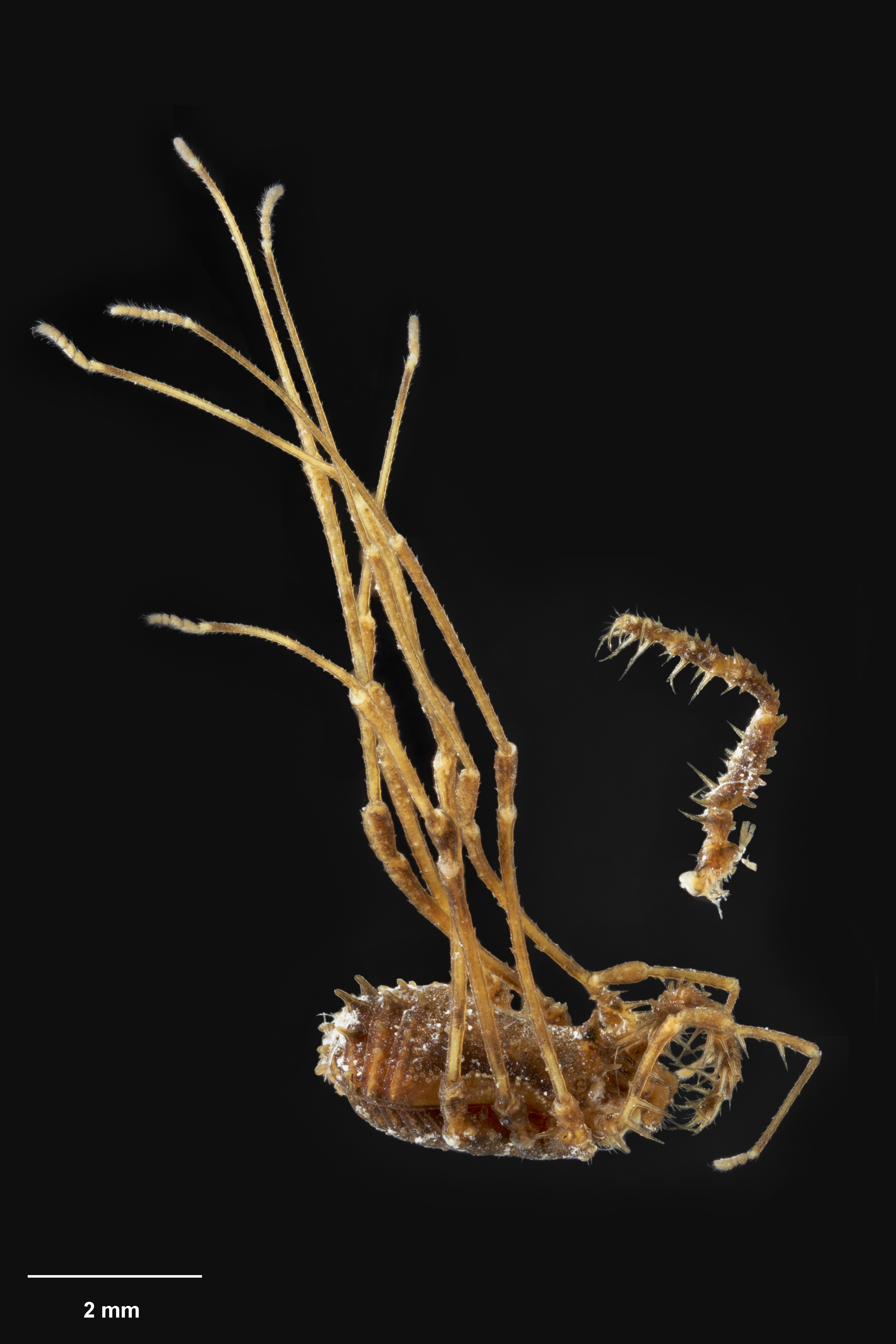
- Holotype female

Scientific classification
- Kingdom: Animalia
- Phylum: Arthropoda
- Subphylum: Chelicerata
- Class: Arachnida
- Order: Opiliones
- Family: Triaenonychidae
- Genus: Algidia
- Species: A. homerica

Binomial name
- Algidia homerica Forster, 1954

= Algidia homerica =

Species of harvester

Algidia homerica is a species in the genus Algidia in the harvestman family Triaenonychidae. It was collected at Homer in the Fiordland region of New Zealand. Only a single female specimen is known.

== Taxonomy ==
Algidia homerica was described by Ray Forster in 1954 and is a member of the New Zealand endemic genus Algidia in the opilionid (harvestman) family Triaenonychidae. The type specimen is held at Te Papa.

== Description ==
The female has the general characteristics of Algidia. It can be distinguished from other species by the presence of an erect spine-shaped tubercle on top of the eyemound and the spines on the leading edge of the carapace are angled at approximately 45^{o} above the horizontal. No other species is known to possess both these characters. Males are unknown.

== Distribution ==
The only known specimen was collected by Ray Forster in 1946. He gave the collecting locality as Homer. On the basis of other collections made by Ray Forster on the same date and held by Te Papa, it is assumed this is in the vicinity of Homer Forks, near the Homer Hut, and the then unfinished Homer Tunnel in the Fiordland region of New Zealand.

== Conservation status ==
Algidia homerica has not been assessed under the New Zealand Threat Classification System.
