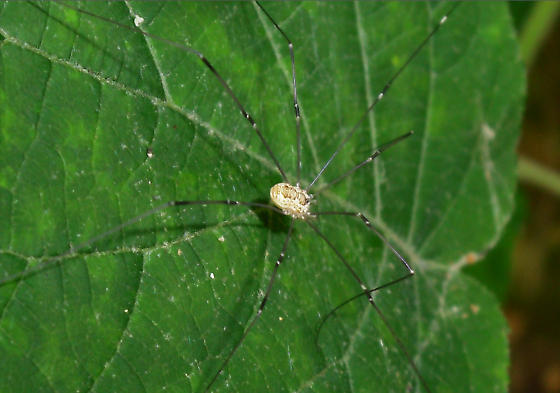

Scientific classification
- Kingdom: Animalia
- Phylum: Arthropoda
- Subphylum: Chelicerata
- Class: Arachnida
- Order: Opiliones
- Family: Sclerosomatidae
- Genus: Leiobunum
- Species: L. aldrichi

Binomial name
- Leiobunum aldrichi (Weed, 1893)

= Leiobunum aldrichi =

Species of harvestman/daddy longlegs

Leiobunum aldrichi is a species of harvestman in the family Sclerosomatidae. It is found in North America.
