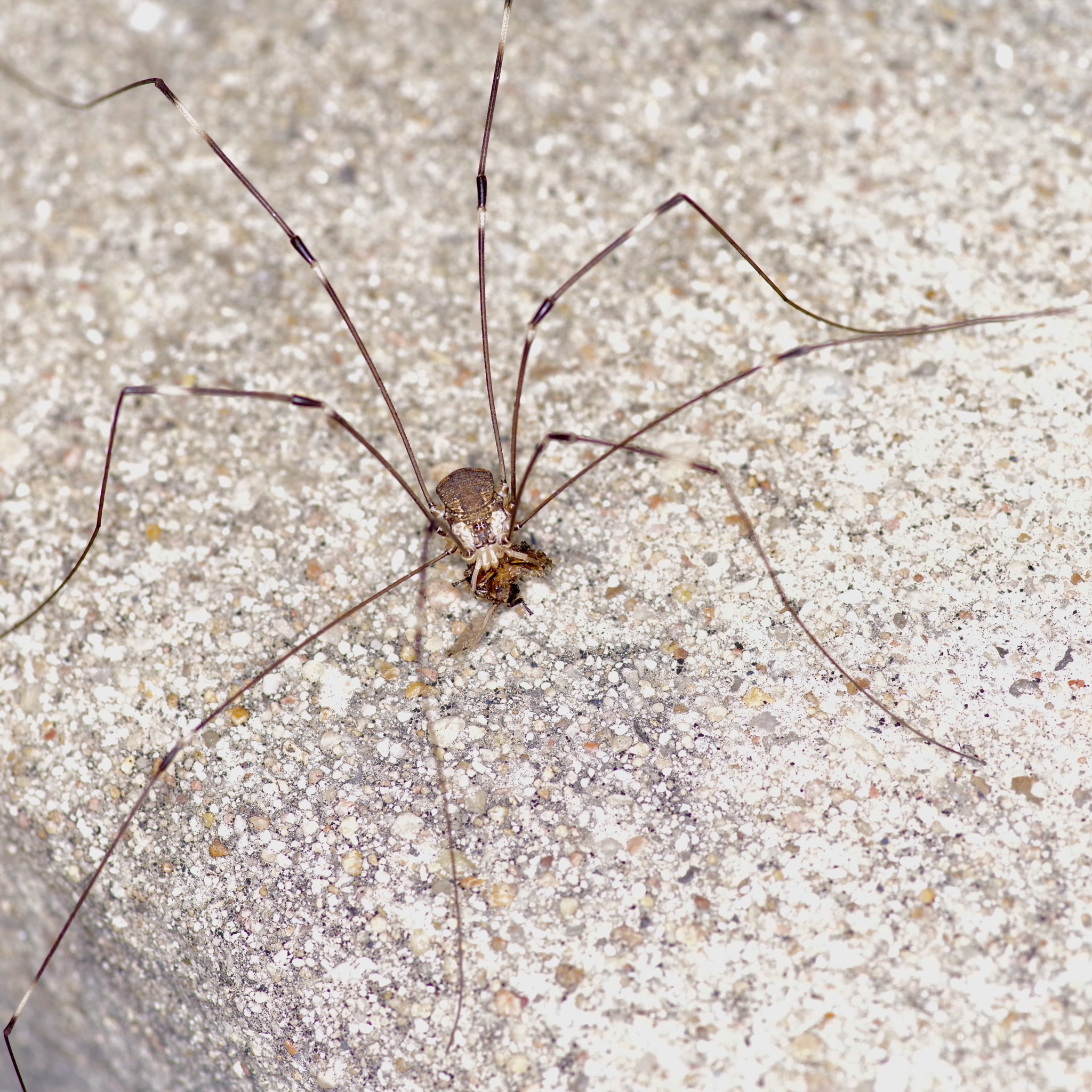

Scientific classification
- Kingdom: Animalia
- Phylum: Arthropoda
- Subphylum: Chelicerata
- Class: Arachnida
- Order: Opiliones
- Family: Sclerosomatidae
- Genus: Leiobunum
- Species: L. townsendi

Binomial name
- Leiobunum townsendi Weed, 1893

= Leiobunum townsendi =

Species of harvestman/daddy longlegs

Leiobunum townsendi is a species of harvestman in the family Sclerosomatidae. It is found in North America.
