= Leiobunum relictum =

Scientific classification
- Kingdom: Animalia
- Phylum: Arthropoda
- Subphylum: Chelicerata
- Class: Arachnida
- Order: Opiliones
- Family: Sclerosomatidae
- Genus: Leiobunum
- Species: L. relictum

Binomial name
- Leiobunum relictum Davis, 1934

Species of harvestman/daddy longlegs

Leiobunum relictum is a species of harvestman in the family Sclerosomatidae. It is found in North America.
