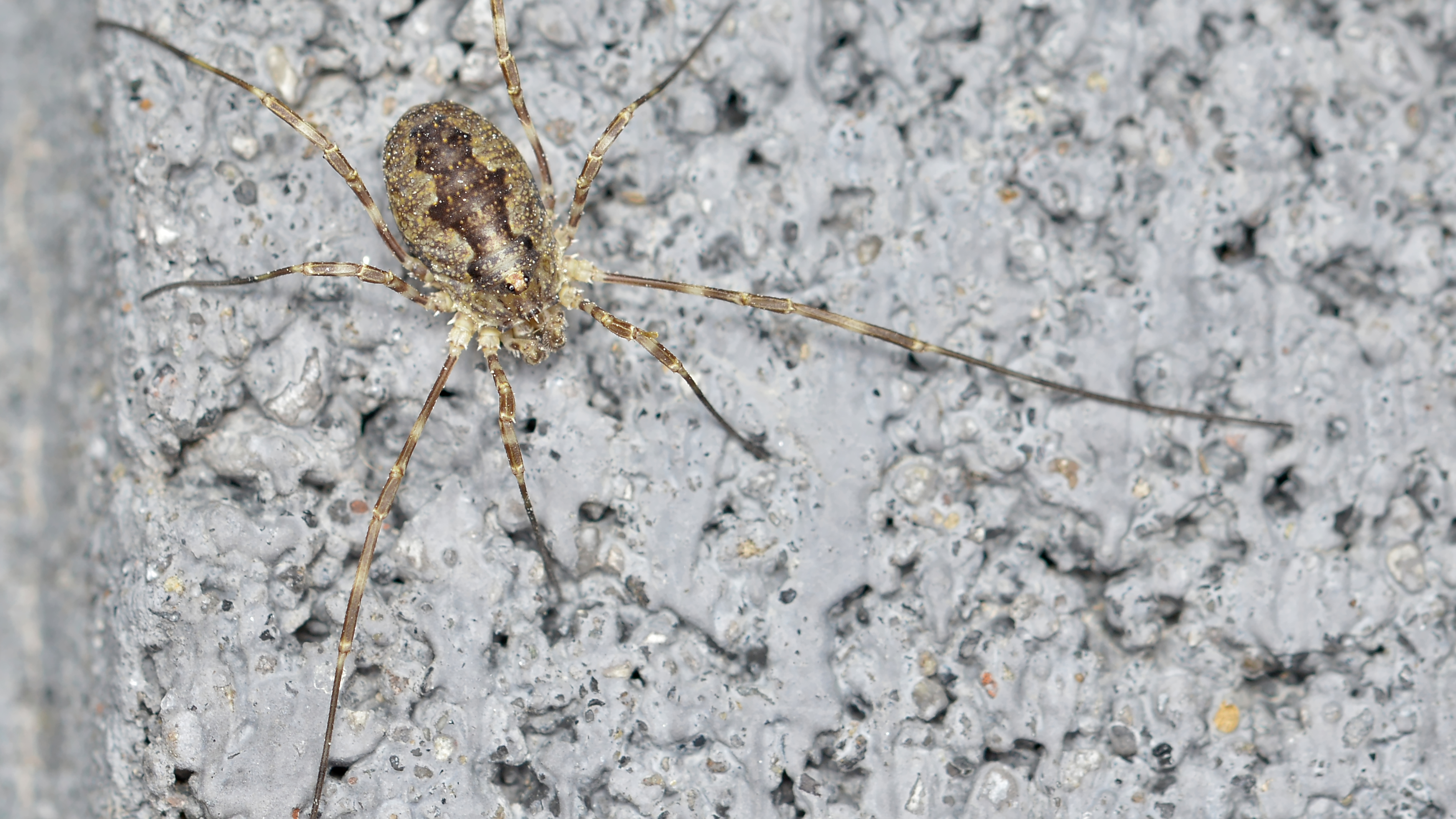

Scientific classification
- Domain: Eukaryota
- Kingdom: Animalia
- Phylum: Arthropoda
- Subphylum: Chelicerata
- Class: Arachnida
- Order: Opiliones
- Family: Phalangiidae
- Genus: Odiellus
- Species: O. pictus

Binomial name
- Odiellus pictus (Wood, 1868)

= Odiellus pictus =

Species of harvestman/daddy longlegs

Odiellus pictus is a species of harvestman in the family Phalangiidae. It is found in North America.
