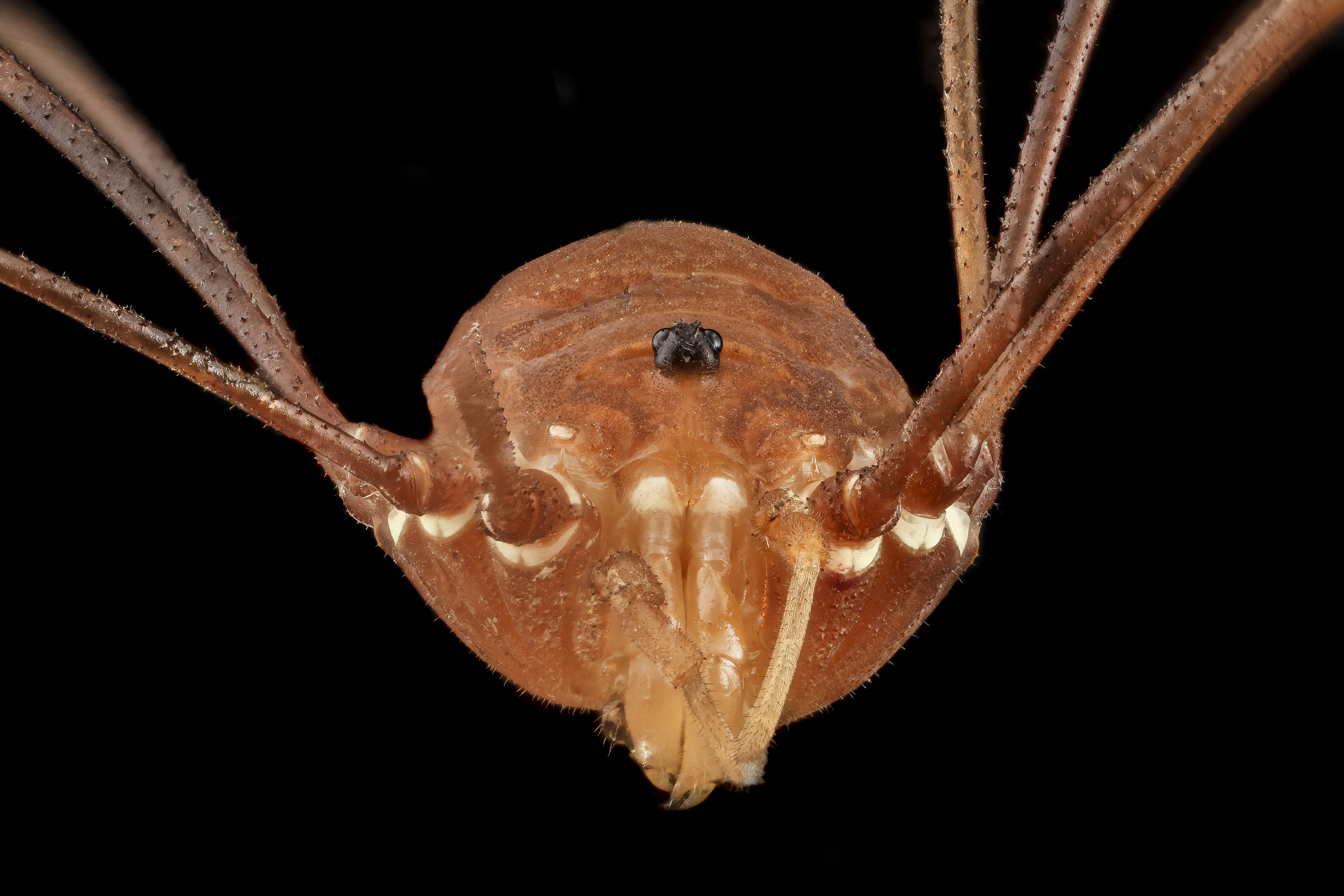

Scientific classification
- Kingdom: Animalia
- Phylum: Arthropoda
- Subphylum: Chelicerata
- Class: Arachnida
- Order: Opiliones
- Family: Sclerosomatidae
- Genus: Leiobunum
- Species: L. flavum

Binomial name
- Leiobunum flavum Banks, 1894

= Leiobunum flavum =

Species of harvestman/daddy longlegs

Leiobunum flavum is a species of harvestman in the family Sclerosomatidae. It is found in North America.

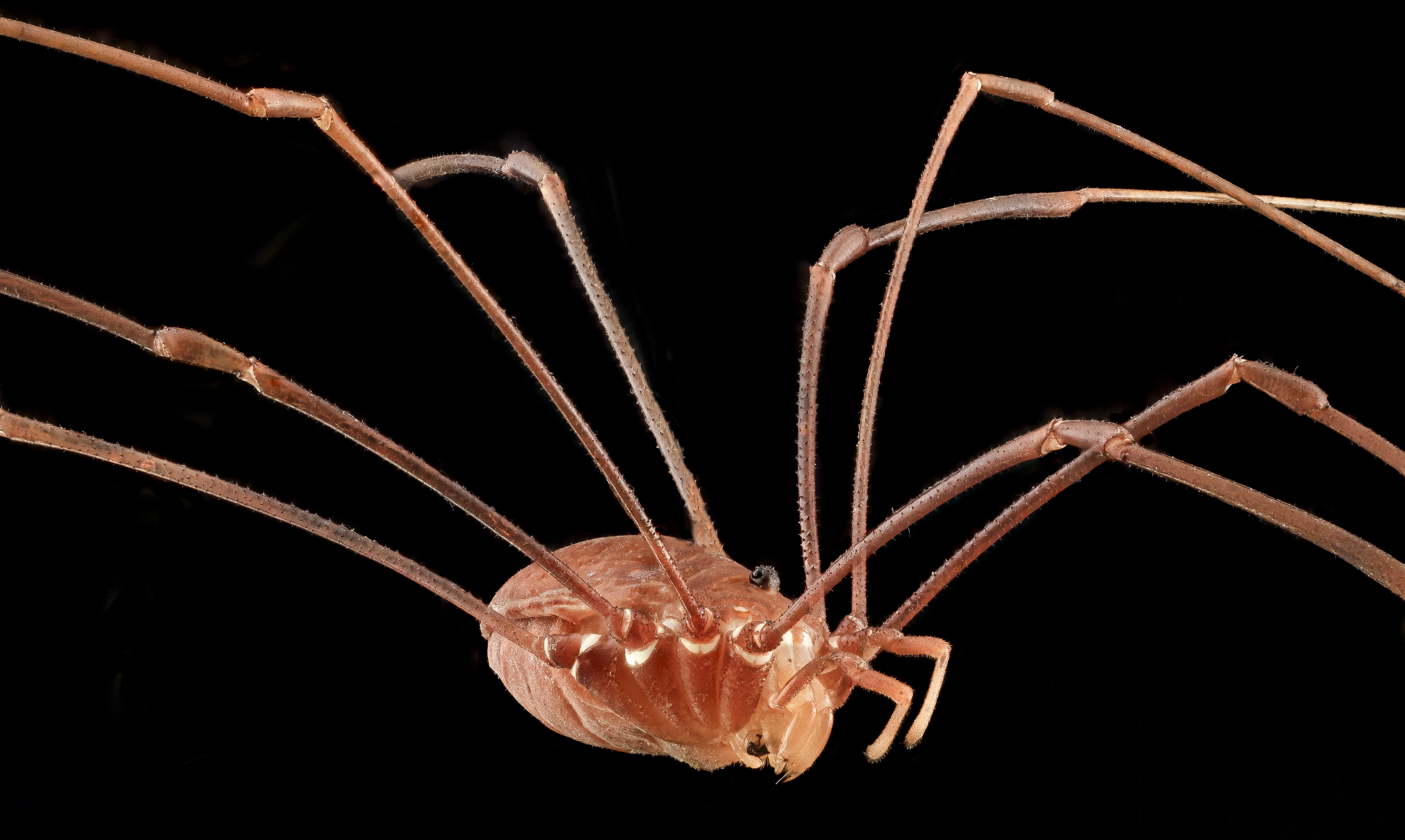
