= Plasmatocyte =

Plasmatocyes are the most common form of hemocyte (blood cell) in Drosophila Melanogaster. Plasmatocytes are macrophage orthologs. They are found circulating in the hemolymph of adult, pupal and larval flies. They are formed throughout the larval lifespan in sessile pools and in the lymph gland. Plasmatocytes are phagocytotic and are important in consuming pathogens and apoptotic cells. They also are important in disposing of waste in the fly. Plasmatocytes make up about 95% of the blood cells (hemocytes) in healthy flies, and they can be identified by tools to locate differentially expressed proteins including Hemolectin, Peroxidasin, NimC1, Croquemort, Collagen, and Eater. In addition to their other functions, Plasmatocytes can secrete extra cellular matrix (ECM) proteins which is important for embryogenesis.
