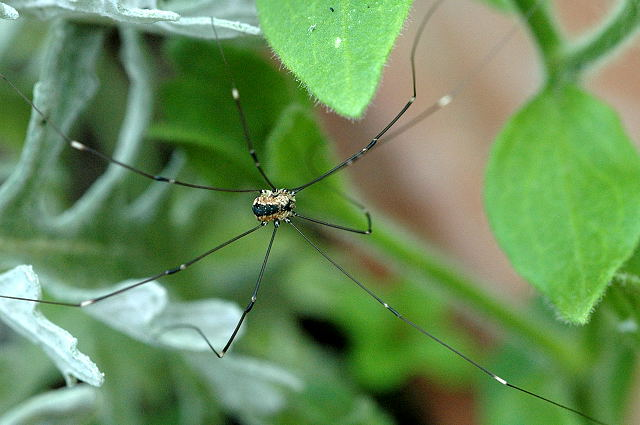
- Female L. rotundum
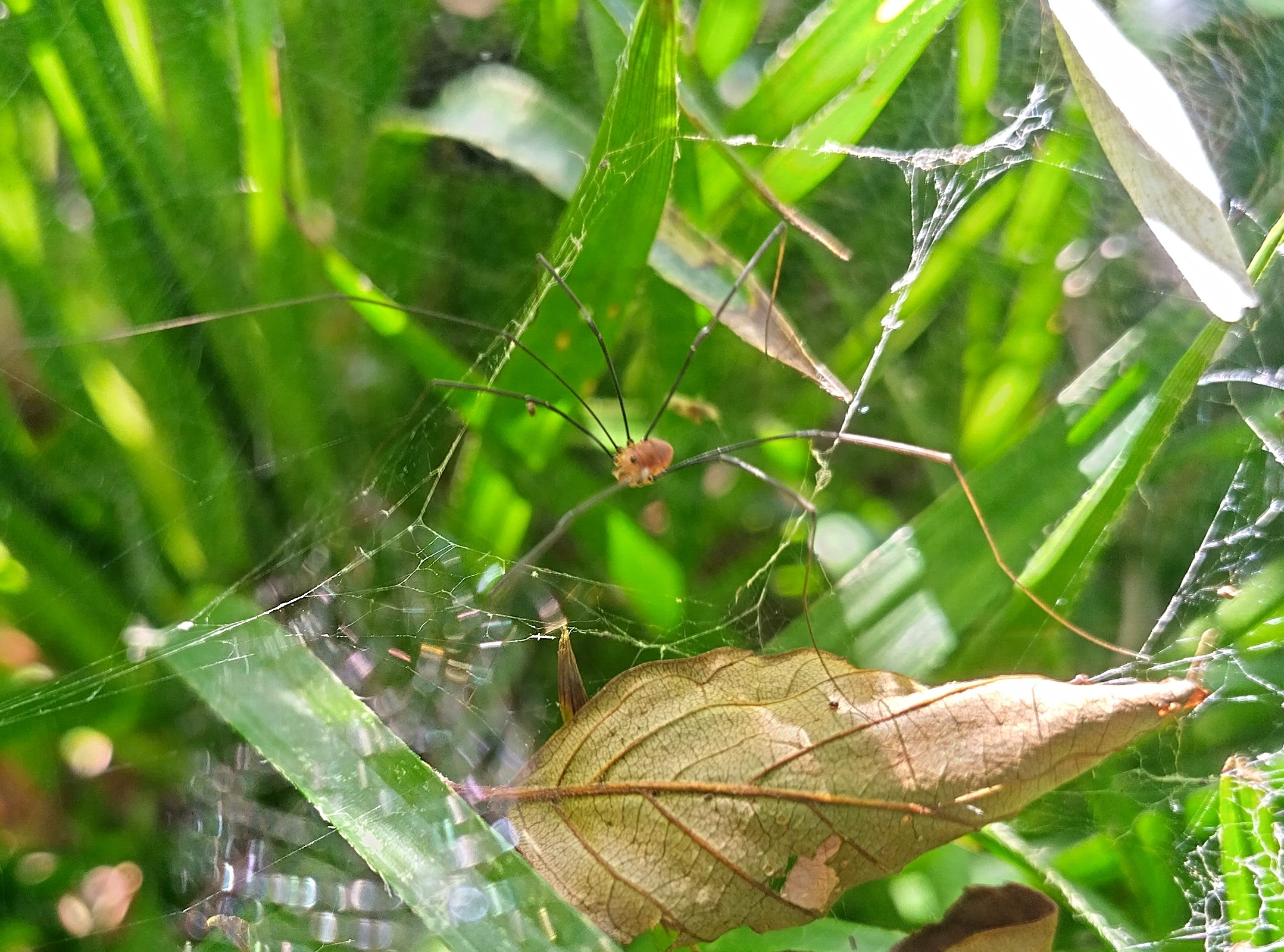
- Male L. rotundum

Scientific classification
- Kingdom: Animalia
- Phylum: Arthropoda
- Subphylum: Chelicerata
- Class: Arachnida
- Order: Opiliones
- Family: Sclerosomatidae
- Genus: Leiobunum
- Species: L. rotundum

Binomial name
- Leiobunum rotundum (Latreille, 1798)

Synonyms
- Phalangium rotundum Opilio fasciatus Opilio hemisphaericus Phalangium longipes Phalangium filipes Leiobunum rufum

= Leiobunum rotundum =

Species of harvestman/daddy longlegs

Leiobunum rotundum female at ground level vegetation of a hedge

Leiobunum rotundum is a species of harvestman that is found within the western portion of the Old World.

== Description ==
Leiobunum rotundum is chestnut-brown, with a small, smooth, and very long round or oval body and thin black legs, as well as having no separation between the head and the abdomen. The harvestman's legs can be self-amputated if it is in danger of predation, but they do not regenerate. Although the harvestman has no fangs, poison glands, or silk glands, it can protect itself with the scent glands on the front of its body. The scent glands produce a secretion that repels predators. The species has three different types of nephrocytes. Numerous large nephrocytes occur in clusters between the muscles in the anterior region of the body. Smaller nephrocytes are scattered throughout the body, often stuck to tracheoles. The third type of nephrocyte is attached to the heart wall by connective ligaments. The morphology of the tracheae in this species is very similar to that of Nemastoma lugubre.

== Distribution ==
This harvestman is widespread throughout Britain, including the Channel Islands. It can also be found on the Canary Islands and in Africa. As at 2023 this species is regarded as newly introduced to British Columbia in Canada and Washington in the United States.

== Habitat ==
The species can be found among vegetation such as long grass, herbaceous plants, shrubs, and trees.

== Diet ==
The harvestman eats a diverse range of small invertebrates, either alive or dead, including e.g. caterpillars, mites, woodlice, and slugs. It has been suggested the species may move towards outside lights at night to eat insects that are attracted to them. As for other omnivorous harvestmen, they also likely eat fungi and plant matter. The species will readily drink water, especially dew. It will sometimes suck the juice of overripe or bruised fruit such as windfall apples.
