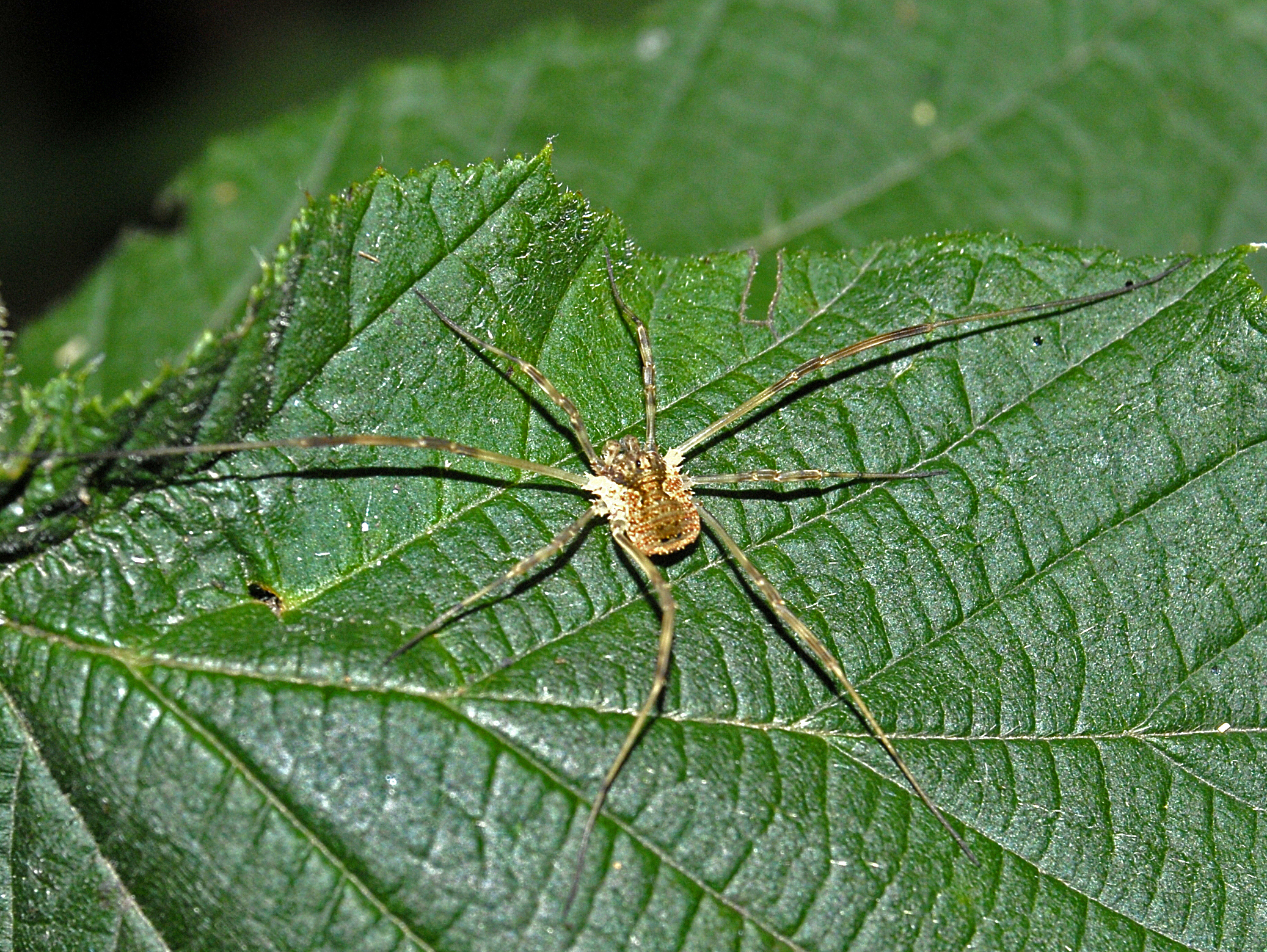
- Odiellus spinosus

Scientific classification
- Domain: Eukaryota
- Kingdom: Animalia
- Phylum: Arthropoda
- Subphylum: Chelicerata
- Class: Arachnida
- Order: Opiliones
- Family: Phalangiidae
- Genus: Odiellus; Roewer, 1923

= Odiellus =

Genus of harvestmen/daddy longlegs

Odiellus is a genus of harvestmen in the family Phalangiidae.

== Species ==
- Odiellus aspersus (Karsch, 1881)
- Odiellus brevispina (Simon, 1879)
- Odiellus duriusculus (Simon, 1879)
- Odiellus granulatus (Canestrini, 1871)
- Odiellus lendlei (Sørensen, 1894)
- Odiellus meadii (O.Pickard-Cambridge, 1890)
- Odiellus nubivagus Crosby & Bishop, 1924
- Odiellus pictus (Wood, 1879)
- Odiellus poleneci Hadzi, 1973
- Odiellus remyi (Doleschall, 1852)
- Odiellus seoanei (Simon, 1879)
- Odiellus signatus (Roewer, 1957)
- Odiellus simplicipes (Simon, 1879)
- Odiellus spinosus (Bosc, 1792)
- Odiellus sublaevis Caporiacco, 1940
- Odiellus troguloides (Lucas, 1847)
- Odiellus zecariensis Mkheidze, 1952
