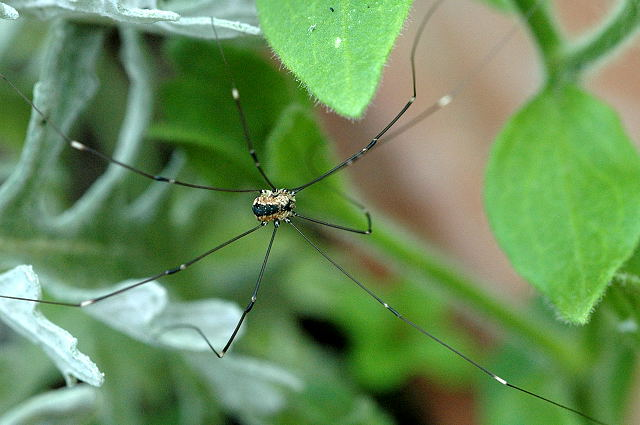
- female L. rotundum

Scientific classification
- Kingdom: Animalia
- Phylum: Arthropoda
- Subphylum: Chelicerata
- Class: Arachnida
- Order: Opiliones
- Family: Sclerosomatidae
- Genus: Leiobunum; C. L. Koch, 1839

Type species
- Phalangium rotundum Latreille, 1798

Species
- See text.

Diversity
- c. 120 species

= Leiobunum =

Leiobunum Temporal range: Jurassic–present

Genus of harvestmen/daddy longlegs

Leiobunum is a genus of the harvestman family Sclerosomatidae with more than 100 described species. Contrary to popular belief, they are not spiders, although they share a resemblance. They are arachnids, in the order Opiliones, harvestmen. Species in Leiobunum tend to have relatively long legs compared with other harvestmen, and some species are gregarious.

== Taxonomy ==
The genus was first described by Carl Ludwig Koch in 1798. The type species is Phalangium rotundum which became Leiobunum rotundum.

== Species ==
- Leiobunum annulipes Banks, 1909 (Costa Rica)
- Leiobunum aldrichi (Weed, 1893) (US – eastern)
- Leiobunum alvarezi Goodnight & Goodnight, 1945 (Mexico)
- Leiobunum anatolicum Roewer, 1957 (Turkey)
- Leiobunum annulatum Walker, 1930 (US)
- Leiobunum apenninicum (Martens, 1969) (Italy, France, Austria)
- Leiobunum aurugineum Crosby & Bishop, 1924 (US – southeastern)
- Leiobunum bicolor (Wood, 1870) (eastern US)
- Leiobunum bifrons Roewer, 1957 (Japan)
- Leiobunum bimaculatum Banks, 1893 (US – California)
- Leiobunum biseriatum Roewer, 1910 (Morocco, Portugal, Spain)
- Leiobunum blackwalli Meade, 1861 (Europe – widespread: Germany, Spain, etc)
- Leiobunum bogerti Goodnight & Goodnight, 1942 (Mexico)
- Leiobunum bolivari Goodnight & Goodnight, 1945 (Mexico)
- Leiobunum bracchiolum C.R.McGhee, 1977 (US – eastern)
- Leiobunum bruchi Mello-Leitão, 1933 (Mexico)
- Leiobunum brunnea Walker, 1930 (US)
- Leiobunum calcar (Wood, 1870) (US – northeastern)
- Leiobunum caporiacci Roewer, 1957 (Greece)
- Leiobunum coccineum Simon, 1878 (Algeria)
- Leiobunum colimae Goodnight & Goodnight, 1945 (Mexico)
- Leiobunum consimile Banks, 1900 (Mexico)
- Leiobunum crassipalpe Banks, 1909 (Washington)
- Leiobunum cretatum Crosby & Bishop, 1924 (southeastern US)
- Leiobunum cupreum Simon, 1878 (Morocco, poss. Turkey, Cyprus, Lebanon)
- Leiobunum curvipalpi Roewer, 1910 (Japan)
- Leiobunum cypricum Roewer, 1957 (Cyprus)
- Leiobunum davisi (Goodnight & Goodnight, 1942)(Mexico)
- Leiobunum defectivum Rambla, 1959 (Spain)
- Leiobunum denticulatum Banks, 1900 (Mexico)
- Leiobunum depressum Davis, 1934 (US)
- Leiobunum desertum Goodnight & Goodnight, 1944 (Mexico)
- Leiobunum dromedarium F.O.Pickard-Cambridge, 1904 (Mexico)
- Leiobunum ephippiatum Roewer, 1910 (Oregon)
- Leiobunum escondidum Chamberlin, 1925 (California)
- Leiobunum euserratipalpe Ingianni, McGhee & Shultz, 2011
- Leiobunum exillipes (Wood, 1878) (California, Nevada)
- Leiobunum flavum Banks, 1894 (Louisiana, Mexico)
- Leiobunum formosum (Wood, 1870) (northeastern US)
- Leiobunum fuscum Roewer, 1910 (Guatemala)
- Leiobunum ghigii Caporiacco, 1929 (Italy)
- Leiobunum globosum Suzuki, 1953 (Japan, Russia)
- Leiobunum glabrum L.Koch, 1869 (Tirols)
- Leiobunum gordoni Goodnight & Goodnight, 1945 (Alabama)
- Leiobunum gracile Thorell, 1876
- Leiobunum gruberi Karaman, 1996 (Macedonia)
- Leiobunum guerreoensis Goodnight & Goodnight, 1946 (Mexico)
- Leiobunum hedini Roewer, 1936 (China)
- Leiobunum heinrichi Roewer, 1957 (Burma)
- Leiobunum hiasai Suzuki, 1976 (Japan)
- Leiobunum hikocola Suzuki, 1966 (Japan)
- Leiobunum hiraiwai (Sato & Suzuki, 1939)

- Leiobunum hiraiwai hiraiwai (Sato & Suzuki, 1939) (Japan)
- Leiobunum hiraiwai fuji Suzuki, 1976 (Japan)
- Leiobunum hiraiwai izuense Suzuki, 1976 (Japan)
- Leiobunum hiraiwai longum Suzuki, 1976 (Japan)
- Leiobunum hiraiwai shiranense Suzuki, 1976 (Japan)

- Leiobunum hoffmani Ingianni, McGhee and Shultz, 2011 (US)
- Leiobunum holtae McGhee, 1977 (US)
- Leiobunum hongkongium Roewer, 1957 (China)
- Leiobunum hoogstraali Goodnight & Goodnight, 1942 (Mexico)
- Leiobunum knighti Goodnight & Goodnight, 1942 (Mexico)
- † Leiobunum inclusum Roewer, 1939 (fossil: Baltic amber)
- Leiobunum insignitum Roewer, 1910 (Mexico)
- Leiobunum insulare Roewer, 1957 (Greece)
- Leiobunum ischionotatum (Dugès, 1884)

- Leiobunum ischionotatum ischionotatum (Dugès, 1884) (Mexico)
- Leiobunum ischionotatum luteovittatum Roewer, 1912 (Mexico)

- Leiobunum japanense (Müller, 1914)

- Leiobunum japanense japanense (Müller, 1914) (Japan)
- Leiobunum japanense japonicum (Suzuki, 1940) (Japan, Korea, Taiwan)
- Leiobunum japanense uenoi Suzuki, 1964 (Japan)

- Leiobunum japonicum (Müller, 1914) (Japan)
- Leiobunum kohyai Suzuki, 1953 (Japan)
- Leiobunum leiopenis Davis, 1934 (US – Oklahoma, Kentucky)
- Leiobunum limbatum L.Koch, 1861 (Europe – Alps)
- Leiobunum lindbergi Roewer, 1959
- Leiobunum longipes Weed, 1890

- Leiobunum longipes longipes Weed, 1890 (US – northern)
- Leiobunum longipes aldrichi Weed, 1893 (US – northern)

- Leiobunum lusitanicum Roewer, 1923 (Portugal)
- Leiobunum maculosus (Wood, 1868)
- Leiobunum manubriatum (Karsch, 1881) (Japan)
- Leiobunum marmoratum F.O.Pickard-Cambridge, 1904 (Mexico)
- Leiobunum maximum Roewer, 1910

- Leiobunum maximum distinctum Suzuki, 1973 (Japan)
- Leiobunum maximum formosum Suzuki, 1976 (Taiwan)
- Leiobunum maximum maximum Roewer, 1910 (China, Japan, Taiwan)
- Leiobunum maximum yushan Suzuki, 1976 (Taiwan)

- Leiobunum mesopunctatum Goodnight & Goodnight, 1942 (Mexico)
- Leiobunum metallicum Roewer, 1932 (Mexico)
- Leiobunum mexicanum Banks, 1898 (Mexico)
- Leiobunum montanum Suzuki, 1953

- Leiobunum montanum montanum Suzuki, 1953 (Japan)
- Leiobunum montanum sobosanum Suzuki, 1976 (Japan)

- Leiobunum nigrigenum Goodnight & Goodnight, 1945 (Mexico)
- Leiobunum nigripes Weed, 1887
- Leiobunum nigripalpe (Simon, 1879) (France)
- Leiobunum nigropalpi (Wood, 1870) (northeastern US)
- Leiobunum nycticorpum Goodnight & Goodnight, 1942 (Mexico)
- Leiobunum oharai N. Tsurusaki, 1991 (Taiwan)
- Leiobunum oregonense C.J. Goodnight and M.L. Goodnight, 1943
- Leiobunum patzquarum Goodnight & Goodnight, 1942 (Mexico)
- Leiobunum peninsulare Davis, 1934 (US)
- Leiobunum politum Weed, 1890 (eastern US)

- Leiobunum politum politum Weed, 1890
- Leiobunum politum magnum Weed, 1893 (US – Mississippi)

- Leiobunum potanini (Schenkel, 1963) (China)
- Leiobunum potosum Goodnight & Goodnight, 1942 (Mexico)
- Leiobunum relictum Davis, 1934 (US – Oklahoma)
- Leiobunum religiosum (Simon, 1879) (France)
- Leiobunum roseum C.L.Koch, in Hahn & C.L.Koch 1848 (Tirols)
- Leiobunum rotundum (Latreille, 1798) (Europe, North Africa, Canary Islands)
- Leiobunum royali Goodnight & Goodnight, 1946 (Mexico)
- Leiobunum rubrum Suzuki, 1966 (Korea, Japan)
- Leiobunum rumelicum Silhavý, 1965 (Bulgaria)
- Leiobunum rupestre (Herbst, 1799) (central Europe)
- Leiobunum sadoense N. Tsurusaki, 1982 (Japan)
- † Leiobunum sarapum Menge, 1854 (fossil)
- Leiobunum seriatum Simon, 1878 (Asia Minor)

[see also Leiobunum albigenium Sorensen, 1911 (Syria)]

- Leiobunum seriepunctatum Doleschall, 1852
- Leiobunum serratipalpe Roewer, 1910
- Leiobunum silum Shultz, 2018
- Leiobunum simplum Suzuki, 1976
- Leiobunum socialissimum C.L.Koch, 1873 (Morocco) [see misspelling as "socialissium"]
- Leiobunum soproniense Szalay, 1951
- Leiobunum speciosum Banks, 1900 (Alabama)
- Leiobunum subalpinum Komposch, 1998
- Leiobunum supracheliceralis Roewer, 1957
- Leiobunum tamanum Suzuki, 1958
- Leiobunum tascum Goodnight & Goodnight, 1945 (Mexico)
- Leiobunum tisciae Avram, 1968
- Leiobunum tohokuense Suzuki, 1976
- Leiobunum townsendi Weed, 1893 (US – Texas, Arizona)
- Leiobunum trimaculatum Goodnight & Goodnight, 1943 (US – Florida)
- Leiobunum tsushimense Suzuki, 1976
- Leiobunum uxorium (Crosby & Bishop, 1924) (US – southeastern)
- Leiobunum ventricosum (Wood, 1870) (US – northeastern)

- Leiobunum ventricosum ventricosum (Wood, 1870)
- Leiobunum ventricosum hiemale (Weed, 1890) (US – southeastern)
- Leiobunum ventricosum floridanum Davis, 1934 (Florida)

- Leiobunum veracruzensis Goodnight & Goodnight, 1947
- Leiobunum viridorsum Goodnight & Goodnight, 1942 (Mexico)
- Leiobunum verrucosum (Wood, 1870) (New York)
- Leiobunum vittatum (Say, 1821) (central US)

- Leiobunum vittatum vittatum (Say, 1821)
- Leiobunum vittatum dorsatum Say, 1821 (US – northern)
- Leiobunum vittatum minor Weed, 1892 (US – South Dakota)

- Leiobunum wegneri Silhavý, 1976
- Leiobunum zimmermani Roewer, 1952

== Habitat ==
Leiobunum species are found inhabiting tree trunks, fences, and walls such as building walls and stone walls.

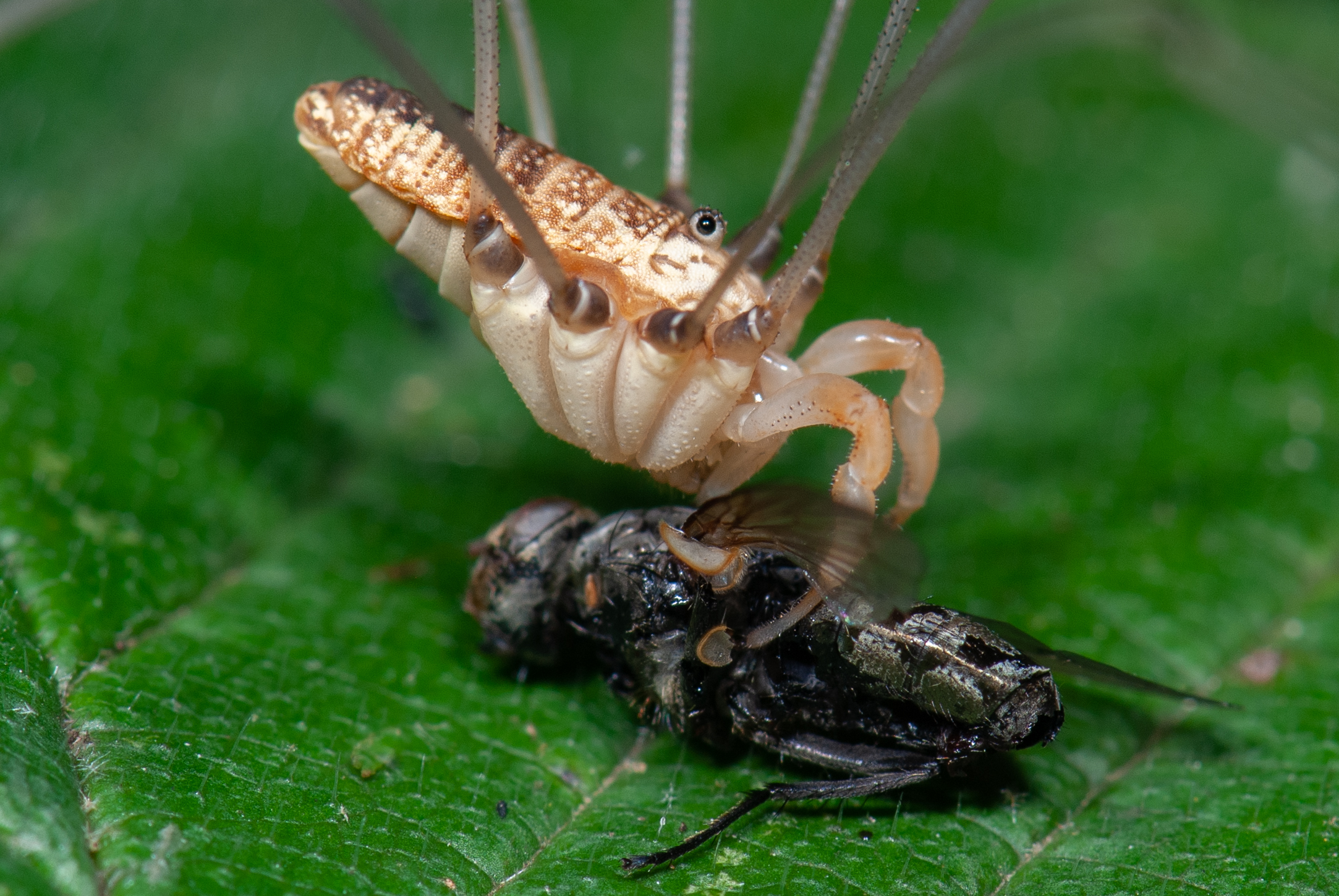
Leiobunum vittatum eating its prey

Furthermore, aggregations of harvestmen have been found located on industrial sites, ledges of windows, beneath roof gutters, and brickstone oven walls. Alike habitats have been found in Germany where Leiobunum aggregates are seen residing on house walls, and in corners of shaded buildings. Negative phototaxis is believed to play a role in this, where they can avoid sunlight.

== Diet ==
Leiobunum are considered to be omnivores with an ability for predation and scavenging. The primary prey for Leiobunum are invertebrates such as Oligochaeta, commonly known as earthworms. However, many smaller species of Leiobunum are not capable of attacking larger earthworms so they do not prey on them frequently, this indicates that they are also capable of scavenging on dead Earthworms as well. For many species, earthworms made up a majority of their diet composition, with Coleoptera being slightly less eaten. Due to the small size of Leiobunum, they are still capable of attacking much larger predators and often use it to their benefit. Aside from predation, they are also observed to consume blackberries as their main source of non-animal food. In addition to their scavenging on earthworms, they also are capable of scavenging on Ephemeroptera significantly larger than them.

In order to feed, Leiobunum have an advantageous adaptation to go further off the ground to prevent any clashes with ground level competition for prey. Leiobunum does not only eat on other animals and fruits, they are also seen to feed on bird droppings therefore can be considered a detritivore and infrequently scavenging on grasshoppers.

== Predators of Leiobunum ==
Harvestman species are preyed upon by spiders, such as Araneus diadematus, Larinioides seriacatus, Marpissa mucosa, and Zygiella x-notata (Clerck 1757, as cited in Wijnhoven, 2011). For example, the body of a Leiobunum was gripped by the jaws of a Marpissa mucosa spider, while having its legs removed (Clerck 1757, as cited in Wijnhoven, 2007).

== Body form ==
The Leiobunum, under the order Opiliones, is commonly identified as 'daddy long-legs' or 'harvestmen'. Arachnids under the order Opiliones are considered the most frequently observed terrestrial arthropods, as they are easily recognized in numerous environments due to their distinctive appearances. True to their common name of 'daddy long-legs', a distinguishable morphological feature of the Leiobunum is their long legs. Like other arachnids, they have eight legs, with the second pair of legs typically being the longest, as these play a crucial role in sensing the environment rather than locomotion. Therefore, the second pair of legs are known as the 'sensory legs', while the remaining six are primarily used for locomotion.

The Leiobunum displays sexual dimorphism between males and females, which can aid in identifying the different species of Leiobunum. In both sexes, the Leiobunum possesses two eyes, while some may have one or no eyes in special cases. Eye placements for the Leiobunum can vary, depending on different suborders, as the eyes can be located dorsally on the prosoma or the ocular tubercle. Additionally, there is a pale yellow longitudinal line between the eyes; if the eyes were on the ocular tubercle, this pale yellow longitudinal line would greatly contrast with the body's colouration. In terms of the body's colouration, the dorsal area of the abdomen shows a brownish-black colour along with darker striper in the middle, while the sides show a brighter colouration.

Male and female Leiobunum vary in terms of morphological characteristics. A male Leiobunum tends to be smaller in length and width and has a flattened, oval body structure with a microsculpture and a scutum parvum in its abdomen. Female Leiobunum are generally larger in length and width with an oval body raised in the abdomen. Male Leiobunum have a slender penis which is whitish in color and feebly sclerotized; the penis also contain strongly elongated glans. Female Leiobunum have a whitish ovipositor for their genital morphology which aids in reproduction; the ovipositor consists of 25–27 segments, with the first 15–17 segments containing two distinct pairs of bristles on the dorsal and ventral sides.

== Sexual reproduction ==
Leiobunum reproduce sexually through intromission, with males having a true penis. A pregenital chamber that encloses the male and female reproductive structures is located in the ventral side of the abdomen, opening to the anterior just below the mouth. This chamber is surrounded by a genital operculum that functions similarly to a trap door through the articulation of a transverse hinge posterior to the abdomen. In males, the penis can be externally exposed in the anterior with the movement of protractor muscles that help evert the reproductive structure, which is made possible by the flexible pregenital chamber. Prior to intromission, the male will initiate mating by attempting to climb on top of the female and grabbing her pedipalps or legs to orient himself to directly face her. The male hooks his pedipalps around the base of the female's second pair of legs. In preparation of the copulatory phase, the penis is everted to make contact with – but not penetrate – the pregenital chamber of the female. Males will typically secrete a nuptial gift from their accessory glands located near his pregenital chamber opening. Male penetration into the female pregenital chamber marks the copulatory phase, followed by a change in body position where the males appear to "face up", resulting in insemination. Mating only last momentarily for a few seconds and do not exhibit courtship behavior before and after copulatory events.

While there no courtship behaviours observed between male and female Leiobunum, pre-mating behaviours has been observed between males undergoing intraspecific combat for suitable mates. Egg-laying females are guarded by a male, until another competitor arrives to challenge the position, in which the winner takes precedence as the new guard.

== Aggregation tendencies ==
A distinctive behavioural trait of Leiobunum species is its pronounced tendency to form into aggregated groups. In contrast to Western Europe – where clustering is common – harvestman in regions such as Poland remain dispersed and unaggregated.

== Invasive species in Europe ==
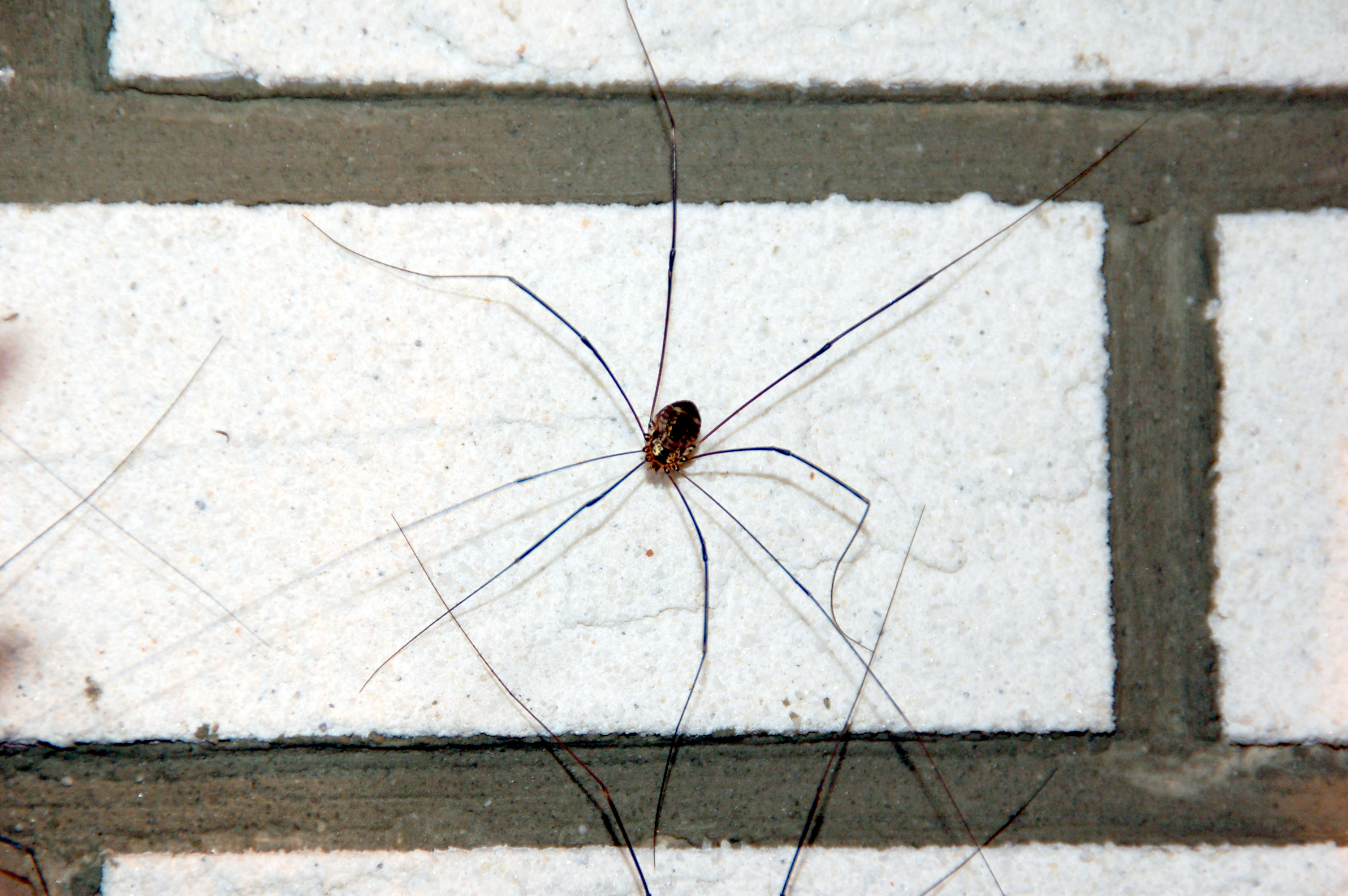
Leiobunum spec. from the Netherlands

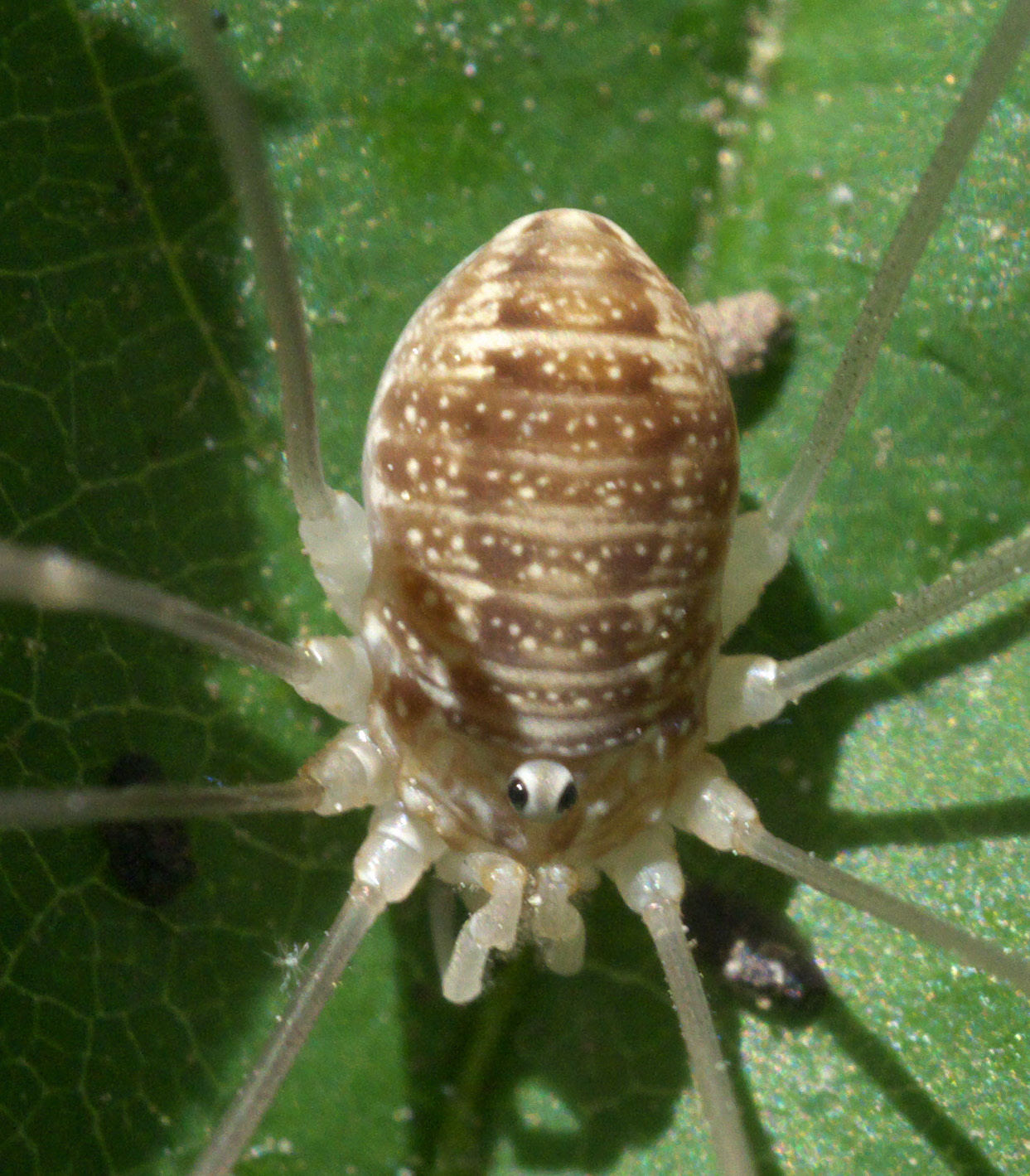
Leiobunum vittatum

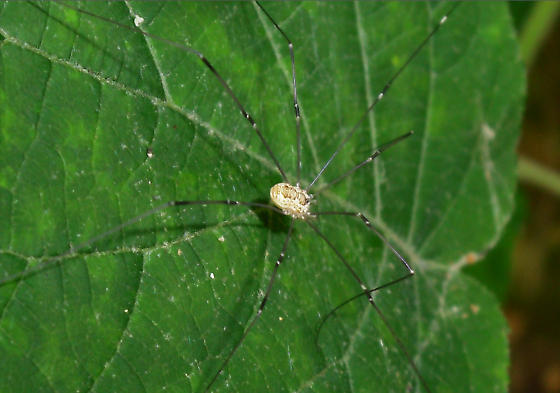
Leiobunum aldrichi

An as yet undescribed species of Leiobunum was first found in the Netherlands in October 2004, although reports date back to at least 2002. Since then, it has been identified from Germany, Switzerland, and Austria. It is distinct from all known Central European species and was probably introduced. Adding on, Leiobunum species have also been found in the European countries of Poland and Czechia.
