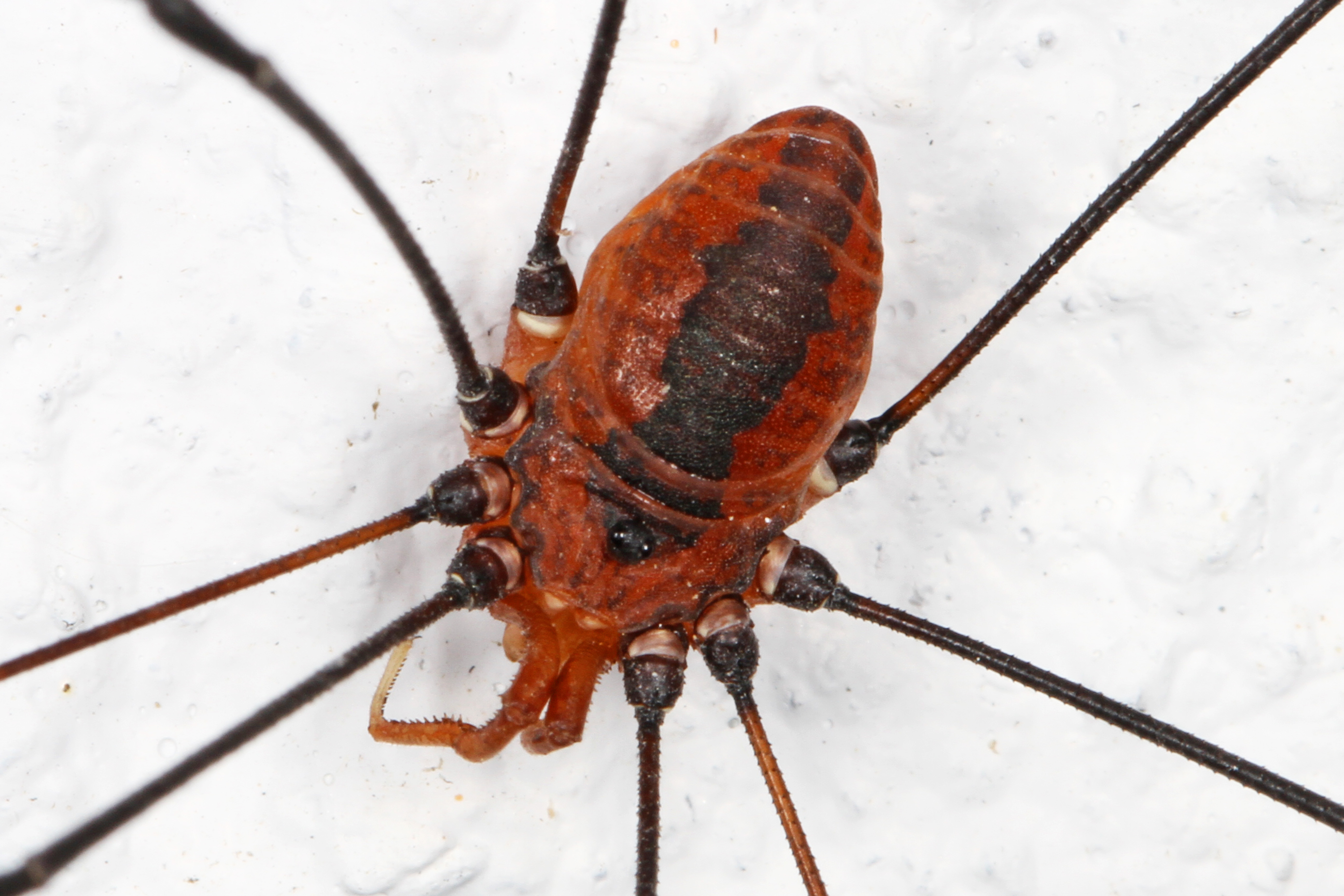

Scientific classification
- Kingdom: Animalia
- Phylum: Arthropoda
- Subphylum: Chelicerata
- Class: Arachnida
- Order: Opiliones
- Family: Sclerosomatidae
- Genus: Leiobunum
- Species: L. vittatum

Binomial name
- Leiobunum vittatum (Say, 1821)

= Leiobunum vittatum =

Species of harvestman/daddy longlegs

Leiobunum vittatum, commonly known as the eastern harvestman, is a species of harvestman in the family Sclerosomatidae. It is native to North America and belongs to the Leiobunum vittatum species group.

The species has been studied in research on defensive chemistry, locomotor biomechanics, phylogenetics, and mating behavior.

== Taxonomy ==
The species was originally described by Thomas Say in 1821 as Phalangium vittatum. It is now classified in the genus Leiobunum, within the family Sclerosomatidae and order Opiliones.

Molecular phylogenetic analyses of eastern North American leiobunine harvestmen recovered a well-supported L. vittatum species group. Relationships within several Leiobunum species groups were less clear, however, and sometimes conflicted with morphology, suggesting that additional taxonomic work may be necessary.

== Description ==
Leiobunum vittatum is a long-legged harvestman with a comparatively small, oval body. Adult males are approximately 5–7 mm long, while females are about 7–8.5 mm long.

Both sexes typically possess a conspicuous dark central dorsal marking extending from the posterior abdomen toward and across the ocularium. Dark patellae and dark bands near the distal ends of the tibiae are also useful identification features.

Males have distinctive elongated pedipalps. The palpal femur is long and curved, and the proximal portion of the palpal tibia bears long spine-like tubercles.

Females are generally larger and more rounded posteriorly than males. Identification of females within the L. vittatum group can be more difficult because closely related species may share similar external coloration and proportions.

== Distribution ==
Leiobunum vittatum is distributed in eastern and central North America.

The species was formally documented from Minnesota in a 2017 survey of the state's harvestmen. The study reported seven harvestman species not previously recorded from Minnesota, including L. vittatum, and noted that the state's harvestman fauna had historically been poorly documented.

== Defensive chemistry ==
Like many harvestmen, L. vittatum possesses paired defensive scent glands. Chemical analysis of its defensive secretion identified the acyclic ketones 4-methylheptan-3-one and E-4,6-dimethyl-6-octen-3-one as major organic components.

These secretions form part of the harvestman's chemical defense system.

== Locomotion ==
The locomotion of L. vittatum has been examined using three-dimensional analysis of high-speed video. During running, the species uses an alternating tripod gait, while its center of mass undergoes substantial vertical and side-to-side movement.

The observed changes in kinetic and potential energy were broadly consistent with mechanical models used for other pedestrian animals. The authors also considered the possible contribution of elastic energy storage in the legs to locomotion.

== Reproduction and mating behavior ==
Mating in L. vittatum includes distinct pre-copulatory and copulatory stages. Interactions may begin with a physical struggle in which the male attempts to grasp the female with his pedipalps and establish a mating embrace.

Experimental observations found that males with shorter pedipalps were more successful at securing females during the initial struggle. Later stages of mating involve tactile interactions between the sexes.

Females can resist mating attempts, including by positioning the body against the substrate in a way that restricts access to the genital opening. Comparative research on leiobunine harvestmen has examined these structures and behaviors in the context of sexual conflict and evolutionary changes in mating systems.

== Research and systematics ==
Leiobunum vittatum has been used in studies of chemical defense, reproductive behavior, locomotor biomechanics, and the evolutionary relationships of North American leiobunine harvestmen.

Molecular analysis using mitochondrial DNA and nuclear DNA supported a vittatum species group, while relationships within portions of the group were less clearly resolved.

The results indicate that relationships and species boundaries among some eastern North American Leiobunum warrant additional morphological and molecular investigation.
