= Dinara (disambiguation) =

Dinara can refer to:

== People ==
- Dinara Alimbekava, Belarusian biathlete
- Dinara Aliyeva, Azerbaijani soprano
- Dinara Asanova, Soviet film director
- Dinara Drukarova, Russian actress
- Dinara Gimatova, Azerbaijani gymnast
- Dinara Nazarbayeva, Kazakhstani businesswoman, daughter of Nursultan Nazarbayev
- Dinara Sadretdinova, Russian actress and TV presenter
- Dinara Saduakassova, Kazakhstani chess player
- Dinara Safina, Russian tennis player
- Dinara Wagner, German chess player

== Geography ==
=== Balkans ===
- Dinara Mountain (Sinjal), highest mountain in Croatia
- Dinara Mountain Range, along the Bosnian-Croatian border
- Dinaric Alps (Dinarides), major mountain region of Europe

=== India ===
- Dinara, Bihar, a village in Bihar, India
- Dinara, Kutch, a village near Bhuj of Kutch district of Gujarat, India.

== Other ==
- The Tale of Tsaritsa Dinara, a Russian folktale
- Dinaria (harvestman), a genus of harvestman
- Dinarius
- Dinar (disambiguation)
