= Prix Joseph Kessel =

Prize in French-language literature

The Prix Joseph Kessel is a prize in French language literature, given to "a book of a high literary value written in French".

The jury includes or has included among its members Tahar Ben Jelloun, Jean-Marie Drot, Michèle Kahn, Pierre Haski, Gilles Lapouge, Michel Le Bris, Érik Orsenna, Patrick Rambaud, Jean-Christophe Rufin, André Velter and Olivier Weber.

== Joseph-Kessel Prize winners ==
Year		Author	Title	Publisher (x times)
1991		Michel Deguy	Au sujet de Shoah, le film de Claude Lanzmann	Éditions Belin
1992		Serge Daney	Devant la recrudescence des vols de sacs à main	Arléa
1993	nothumb	Régis Debray	Vie et Mort de l'image. Une histoire du regard en occident	Gallimard
1994	nothumb	Daniel Schneidermann	Arrêts sur images (essai)	Fayard
1995		Yves Courrière	Pierre Lazareff ou le Vagabond	Gallimard (2)
1996		Jean-Claude Guillebaud	Écoutez voir !	Arléa (2)
1997	nothumb	Jean-Paul Kauffmann	La Chambre noire de Longwood	La Table ronde
1998		Olivier Weber	Lucien Bodard, un aventurier dans le siècle	Plon
1999		Christian Millau	Au galop des hussards	Fallois
2000		Geneviève Moll	Yvonne de Gaulle (essai)	Ramsay
2001		Bernard Ollivier	Longue Marche	Phébus
2002	nothumb	Gilles Lapouge	La Mission des frontières	Albin Michel
2003	nothumb	Alain Borer	Koba	Seuil
2004	nothumb	Jean Hatzfeld	Une saison de machettes	Seuil (2)
2005		Anne Vallaeys	Médecins sans frontières, la biographie	Fayard (2)
2006	nothumb	Pierre Haski	Le Sang de la Chine	Grasset
2007	nothumb	Pierre Kalfon	Pampa	Seuil (3)
2008	nothumb	Sorj Chalandon	Mon traître	Grasset (2)
2009	nothumb	Erik Orsenna	L'Avenir de l'eau	Fayard (3)
2010	nothumb	Florence Aubenas	Le Quai de Ouistreham	L'Olivier
2011		Eugène Nicole	Œuvre des mers	L'Olivier (2)
2012	nothumb	Rithy Panh and Christophe Bataille	L'Élimination	Grasset (3)
2013	nothumb	Lionel Duroy	L'Hiver des hommes	Julliard
2014		Thomas B. Reverdy	Les Évaporés	Flammarion
2015	nothumb	Éric Vuillard	Tristesse de la terre	Actes Sud
2016	nothumb	Catherine Poulain	Le grand marin	L'Olivier (3)
2017		Jean-Pierre Perrin	Le Djihad contre le rêve d'Alexandre	Seuil (4)
2018		Marc Dugain	Ils vont tuer Robert Kennedy	Gallimard (3)
