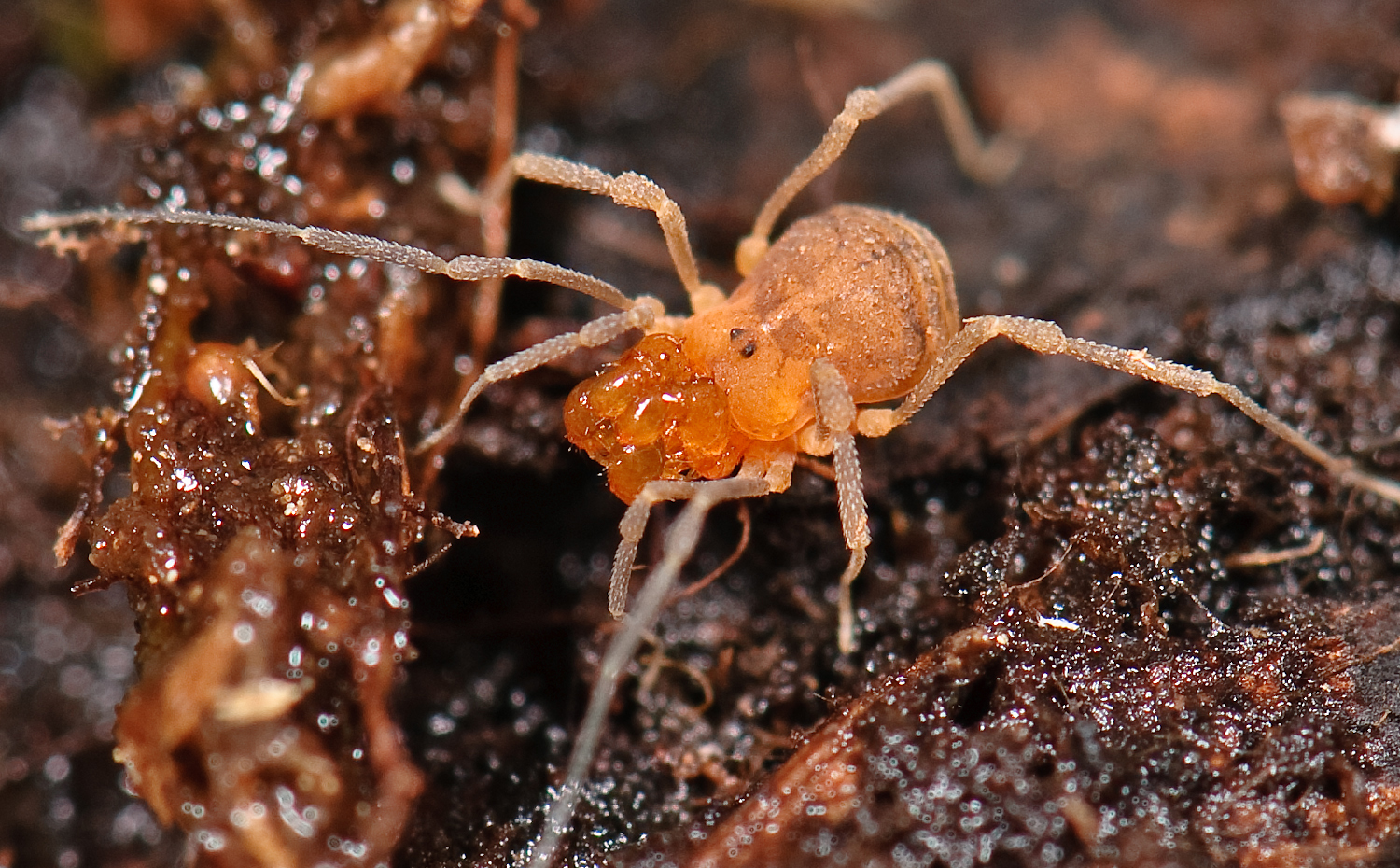
- Briggsus, Oregon

Scientific classification
- Domain: Eukaryota
- Kingdom: Animalia
- Phylum: Arthropoda
- Subphylum: Chelicerata
- Class: Arachnida
- Order: Opiliones
- Infraorder: Insidiatores
- Superfamily: Travunioidea
- Family: Cladonychiidae; Hadži, 1935

Synonyms
- Erebromastridae

= Cladonychiidae =

Family of harvestmen/daddy longlegs

The Cladonychiidae are a small family of harvestman with about 33 described species, within the suborder Laniatores.

== Description ==
Members of this family range from less than two to about four millimeters in body length, with robust, spined pedipalps and rather short legs, although the second pair can be as long as two centimeter. Most Cladonychiidae are reddish brown to dark brown, but cave-dwelling species are pale yellow. Not all species have eyes.

== Distribution ==
The members of Cladonychiidae are found in Southern Europe and the United States.

== Fossils ==
Proholoscotolemon was recently found in Baltic amber.

== Relationships ==
The genera Peltonychia, Holoscotolemon, Erebomaster, Theromaster, Speleonychia, Briggsus, and Isolachus from the family Travuniidae and the former family Pentanychidae have been transferred to Cladonychiidae. This left Travuniidae with three genera from the Balkan region of Europe, Travunia, Trojanella, and Dinaria.

== Name ==
The name of the former type genus Cladonychium (now synonymized with Erebomaster) is derived from Ancient Greek "branched claw".

== Species ==
These genera and species belong to the family Cladonychiidae:

(For Arbasus Roewer, 1935 see Buemarinoidae Karaman, 2019)

- genus Briggsus Özdikmen & Demir, 2008
  - species Briggsus bilobatus (Briggs, 1971)
  - species Briggsus clavatus (Briggs, 1971)
  - species Briggsus flavescens (Briggs, 1971)
  - species Briggsus hamatus (Briggs, 1971)
  - species Briggsus pacificus (Briggs, 1971)
- genus Buemarinoa Roewer, 1956
  - species Buemarinoa patrizii Roewer, 1956
- genus Erebomaster Cope, 1872
  - species Erebomaster acanthinus (Crosby & Bishop, 1924)
  - species Erebomaster flavescens Cope, 1872
    - subspecies Erebomaster flavescens flavescens Cope, 1872
    - subspecies Erebomaster flavescens coecum (Packard, 1888) — Carter cave
  - species Erebomaster weyerensis (Packard, 1888)
- genus Holoscotolemon Roewer, 1915
  - species Holoscotolemon franzinii Tedeschi & Sciaky, 1994
  - species Holoscotolemon jaqueti (Corti, 1905)
  - species Holoscotolemon lessiniense Martens, 1978
  - species Holoscotolemon lessiniensis Martens, 1978
  - species Holoscotolemon monzinii Tedeschi & Sciaky, 1994
  - species Holoscotolemon naturae Tedeschi & Sciaky, 1994
  - species Holoscotolemon oreophilus Martens, 1978
  - species Holoscotolemon querilhaci (Lucas, 1864)
  - species Holoscotolemon unicolor Roewer, 1915
- genus Isolachus Briggs, 1971
  - species Isolachus spinosus Briggs, 1971
- genus Peltonychia Roewer, 1935
  - species Peltonychia clavigera (Simon, 1879)
  - species Peltonychia gabria Roewer, 1935
  - species Peltonychia leprieuri (Lucas, 1861)
  - species Peltonychia leprieurii
  - species Peltonychia navarica (Simon, 1879)
  - species Peltonychia piochardi (Simon, 1872)
  - species Peltonychia postumicola (Roewer, 1935)
  - species Peltonychia sarea (Roewer, 1935)
  - species Peltonychia tenuis Roewer, 1935
- genus Speleonychia Briggs, 1974
  - species Speleonychia sengeri Briggs, 1974
- genus Theromaster Briggs, 1969
  - species Theromaster archeri (Goodnight & Goodnight, 1942)
  - species Theromaster brunneus (Banks, 1902)
- genus † Proholoscotolemon Ubick & Dunlop, 2005
  - species † Proholoscotolemon nemastomoides (Koch & Berendt, 1854)
