= European and Mediterranean book prize =

The European and Mediterranean Book Prize (French: Prix du livre européen et méditerranéen) is a European literary award. It was created in 2013 by the organizers of the European and Mediterranean Book Days in partnership with the European Commission. The prize recognises books that explore cultural exchanges between Europe and the Mediterranean.

The prize is also known as the Paul Balta Prize, after the late journalist Paul Balta, an expert on the Mediterranean.

== Selected jury members ==
- Jean-Claude Augé
- Yahia Belaskri
- Paul Balta
- Sheena Chraïbi
- Florence Raut
- Odile Cazenave
- Michèle Guyot-Rose

== Honorees ==
- 2014: Éric Fottorino
- 2015: Yahia Belaskri
- 2016: Robert Solé
- 2017: Olivier Weber
- 2018: Jean-Marie Blas de Roblès
- 2021: Leïla Bahsaïn and Alexandre Feraga
- 2023: Emmanuel Ruben
- 2024: Akli Tadjer
