= Eugène Nicole =

French writer (born 1942)

- Born: 1942 (age 83–84); Saint-Pierre-et-Miquelon, France
- Occupation: Writer

Eugène Nicole (born 1942) is a French writer. He became a professor at New York University in 1989 and has written five books about his childhood and his life journeys. He won the Prix Joseph Kessel and has also been recognized as a specialist in Marcel Proust.

== Life ==
Born in Saint Pierre and Miquelon, Nicole left the archipelago at the age of 14 in 1957 to study at a Vendée boarding school. He then took courses at the Sorbonne and at the Institut d'études politiques de Paris. After a stay in Alaska in 1968, he began an academic career in the United States and defended a doctoral thesis in French literature. In 1989 he became professor of linguistics and French literature at New York University. He wrote his first novel L’Œuvre des mers, the first opus of an autobiographical saga of five books describing his childhood in Saint Pierre and Miquelon, then the exile, the journeys, the round trips on the archipelago over the years. L’Œuvre des mers is the main work to which Nicole has devoted his life. He, himself, defines the first part as "the novel of a childhood and a place". In 2011, he was awarded the Prix Joseph-Kessel for this book.

Nicole is also recognized as a specialist in Marcel Proust. He participated in the edition in the Bibliothèque de la Pléiade of In Search of Lost Time as well as in the edition of the volumes À l'ombre des jeunes filles en fleurs and Le Temps retrouvé for Le Livre de Poche in 1993.

== Works ==
- L’Œuvre des mers, Paris, Bourin Éditeur, 1988, 275 p. ISBN 2-87686-013-9
- Les Larmes de pierre, Paris, Bourin Éditeur, 1991, 284 p. ISBN 2-87686-070-8
- Le Caillou de l’Enfant-Perdu, Paris, Groupe Flammarion, 1996, 279 p. ISBN 2-08-067326-2
- La Ville sous son jour clair, 2005, (first published in L’Œuvre des mers, édition augmentée, Paris, Éditions de l'Olivier, 2011, 941 p. ISBN 978-2-87929-651-7)
- Alaska, Paris, Éditions de l’Olivier, 2007, 244 p. ISBN 978-2-87929-552-7
- À coups de pied-de-mouche, Coutras, France, Éditions Le Bleu du ciel, 2010, 122 p. ISBN 978-2-915232-69-1
- Un Adieu au long cours, 2011, (first published in L’Œuvre des mers, expanded edition, Paris, Éditions de l’Olivier, 2011, 941 p. ISBN 978-2-87929-651-7)
- L’Œuvre des mers, expanded edition, Paris, Éditions de l’Olivier, 2011, 941 p. ISBN 978-2-87929-651-7 a saga comprising five parts containing the five books: L’Œuvre des mers, Les Larmes de pierre, Le Caillou de l’Enfant-Perdu, La ville sous son jour clair, Un adieu au long cours

- prix Joseph-Kessel 2011.

- Les Eaux territoriales, Paris, Éditions de l’Olivier,2013, 180 p. ISBN 978-2-8236-0110-7
- Le Démon rassembleur, Paris, P.O.L., 2014, 224 p. ISBN 978-2-8180-1992-4
