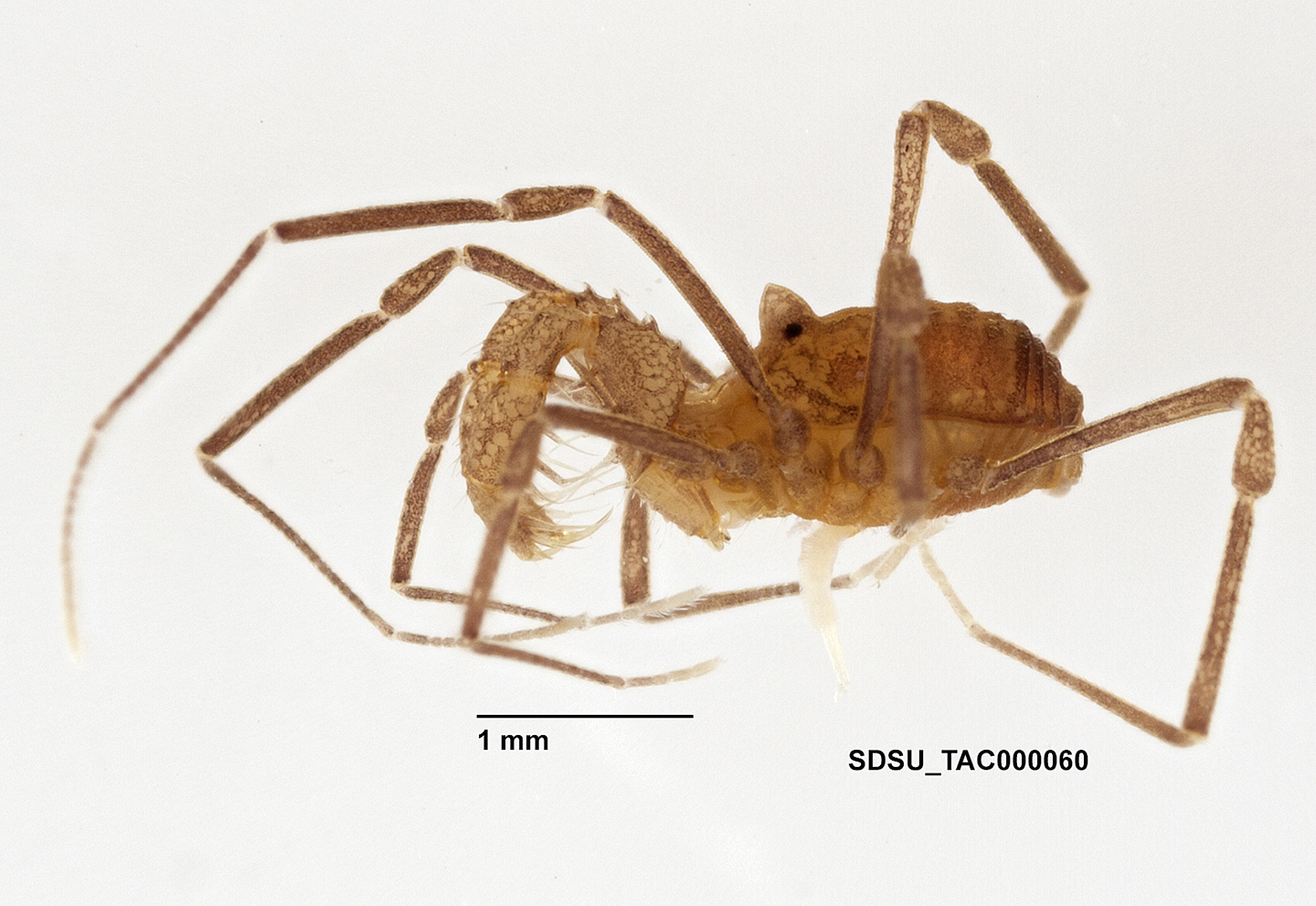

Scientific classification
- Kingdom: Animalia
- Phylum: Arthropoda
- Subphylum: Chelicerata
- Class: Arachnida
- Order: Opiliones
- Family: Cladonychiidae
- Genus: Erebomaster
- Species: E. acanthinus

Binomial name
- Erebomaster acanthinus (Crosby & Bishop, 1924)

= Erebomaster acanthinus =

Species of harvestman/daddy longlegs

Erebomaster acanthinus is a species of armoured harvestman in the family Travuniidae. It is found in North America.
