= Alain Dugrand =

French journalist, traveller and writer

Alain Dugrand (16 October 1946, Lyon) is a French journalist, traveller and writer.

== Biography ==
Alain Dugrand was among the journalists who created the newspaper Libération. As a traveller, he worked for the magazines GEO and National Geographic.

In 1979, he founded a journal devoted to crime fiction: Gang with Hervé Prudon.

He was the creator and director of the magazine Gulliver from 1990 to 1993.

He launched the "Carrefour des littératures européennes de Strasbourg" (1985) then the Étonnants voyageurs festival of Saint-Malo, with Michel Le Bris.

He presides the Prix Nicolas Bouvier and is also the author of several novels.

== Works ==
- 1976: Les Dossiers noirs du racisme dans le Midi de la France, with François Noël Bernardi, Jean Dissler and Alex Panzani, Paris, Éditions du Seuil, series "Combats", 202 p. ISBN 2-02-004407-2
- 1983: Les Barcelonnettes, volume 1, Les Jardins de l'Alaméda, with Anne Vallaeys, Paris, Fayard, 432 p. BnF 347165423
- 1984: Le Désemparé, Paris, Éditions JC Lattès, 222 p. BnF 34759626p
- 1985: Les Barcelonnettes, volume 2, Terres Chaudes, with Anne Vallaeys, Fayard, 361 p. BnF 347812895
- 1985: Mexico terremoto, with Patrice Gouy, Strasbourg, Éditions Bueb et Reumaux, 154 p. ISBN 2-86856-014-8
- 1987: Les Barcelonnettes, volume 3, La Soldadera, with Anne Vallaeys, Fayard, 308 p. BnF 349101270
- 1987: Une certaine sympathie, JC Lattès, 177 p. ISBN 2-7096-0564-3

- Prix Roger Nimier 1987

- 1988: Trotsky. Mexico 1937-1940, Paris, Éditions Payot, seris "Document Payot", 200 p. ISBN 2-228-88077-9
- 1989: Gloria America, with Michel Antochiw, Éditions JC Lattès, 266 p. BnF 35026922q
- 1989: Mexique, with Patrice Gouy, Michel Antochiw, Paris, Éditions Départ, series "Guides Départ", 114 p. ISBN 2-908359-02-2
- 1989: La Folie d'Astérion, with Mariwak, Paris, Éditions de La Différence, ISBN 2-7291-0455-0
- 1989: Le Sceptre égaré, with Mariwak, Éditions de La Différence, ISBN 2-7291-0454-2
- 1991: Le Quatorzième Zouave, Paris, Éditions de l'Olivier, 185 p. ISBN 2-87929-018-X

- Prix Paul Léautaud 1991
- Prix Louis-Guilloux 1992

- 1993: Belize, Éditions Payot, series "Voyageur Payot", 228 p. ISBN 2-228-88675-0
- 1994: Les Craven de l'oncle Ho, Paris, Éditions Grasset, 287 p. ISBN 2-246-46731-4
- 1996: La Baie des singes, Grasset, 247 p. ISBN 2-246-46741-1
- 1998: Barbizon (Japon), with Jean-Pierre Cagnat, Paris, Éditions Verticales, 132 p. ISBN 2-84335-085-9
- 1999: Rue de la République, with Anne Vallaeys, Grasset, 343 p. ISBN 2-246-54471-8
- 2001: Rhum-limonade, Fayard, 196 p. ISBN 2-213-60723-0
- 2001: Irak. Dix ans d'embargo, with Jacques Ferrandez, Tournai, Paris, Éditions Casterman, 79 p. ISBN 2-203-38037-3
- 2004: M'sieur Eddy et moi, Fayard, 208 p. ISBN 2-213-61889-5
- 2005: Va, vis et deviens, with Radu Mihaileanu, Grasset, 296 p. ISBN 2-246-67101-9
- 2006: Les Cendres de l'Empire. Voyages du Caucase en Indus, Paris, Éditions Hoëbeke, series "Étonnants voyageurs", 184 p. ISBN 2-84230-249-4
- 2007: Insurgés, Fayard, 225 p. ISBN 978-2-213-62557-7
- 2008: Willi Münzenberg. Artiste en révolution, 1889-1940, with Frédéric Laurent, Fayard, 632 p. + 8 pl. ISBN 978-2-213-63172-1
- 2001: Trésor des livres de mer. De Christophe Colomb à Marin-Marie, with Michèle Polak, Éditions Hoëbeke, 279 p. ISBN 978-2-84230-421-8

- Prix Le Livre du Nautic 2011

- 2012: Des livres à la découverte du monde. De Marco Polo à la Croisière jaune, with Michèle Polak, Éditions Hoëbeke, 279 p. ISBN 978-2-84230-458-4
- 2013: Libération, un moment d'ivresse : 1973-1981, Éditions Fayard, 350 p. ISBN 978-2-213-64367-0

== Documentaire ==
- Alain Dugrand and Patrick Le Gall, Trotsky, 1986 - International SCAM prize for best documentary for creation and essay at the Festival International de Programmes Audiovisuels of Biarritz, 1988.
