= Albert Londres =

French journalist and writer (1884–1932)

- Albert Londres, approximately 1928
- Born: 1 November 1884; Vichy, France
- Died: 16 May 1932 (aged 47)
- Occupations: Journalist and writer
- Known for: One of the inventors of investigative journalism

Albert Londres (1 November 1884 – 16 May 1932) was a French journalist and writer. One of the inventors of investigative journalism, Londres not only reported news but created it, and reported it from a personal perspective. He criticized abuses of colonialism such as forced labour. Albert Londres gave his name to a journalism prize, the Prix Albert-Londres, for Francophone journalists.

== Biography ==
Londres was born in Vichy in 1884. After finishing secondary school, he went to Lyon in 1901 to work as a bookkeeper, then moved to Paris in 1903. He wrote occasional articles for newspapers from his native region, and published his first poetry in 1904. The same year, he started as correspondent in Paris for the Lyon newspaper Le Salut Public. Also in 1904, his daughter Florise was born, but his partner, Marcelle (Marie) Laforest, died one year later. In 1906 he became parliamentary correspondent for Le Matin. His job was to listen to gossip in corridors of the French parliament and report it in anonymous columns. When World War I broke out in 1914, Londres, unfit for military service due to ill health and a weak constitution, became military correspondent for the newspaper at the Ministry of War. Subsequently, made war correspondent, he was sent to Reims during its bombing, alongside the photographer Moreau. Londres' first big article told of the fire in the cathedral on 19 September 1914; the report was published two days later.

Londres wanted to go to the Orient; the editors of Matin refused. So he left to become a foreign affairs reporter for Le Petit Journal. In 1915 he went to south-east Europe to report on combat in Serbia, Greece, Turkey and Albania. On his return, he covered the end of the war in France. In 1919 he was sacked by Le Petit Journal under the orders of the French Prime Minister Clemenceau. Continuing his vocation, Londres reported that "the Italians are very unhappy with the peace conditions concocted by Clemenceau, Lloyd George and Wilson." He then worked for the illustrated daily Excelsior which had sought him. In 1920, Londres succeeded in entering the USSR, described the nascent Bolshevik regime, profiled Vladimir Lenin and Leon Trotsky and told of the suffering of the Russian people.

In 1922 he went to Asia. He reported Japan and the "madness of China". He also covered Jawaharlal Nehru, Mohandas Gandhi and Tagore in India. From 1922 his articles began to be published as books by Albin Michel through Henri Béraud, literary editor of Le Petit Parisien. Londres started investigative stories for Le Petit Parisien. In 1923, he went to the penal colony of Cayenne in French Guiana. Describing the horrors, his reports produced reactions in public opinion and the Establishment.

It must be said that we in France have erred. When someone – sometimes with our knowledge – is sent into forced labour, we say "He has gone to Cayenne". The penal colony is no longer at Cayenne, but at Saint-Laurent-du-Maroni first of all and later at the Îles du Salut. I ask, by the way, that these isles be debaptised, for they are not the Isles of Salvation, but the Isles of Punishment. The law allows us to behead murderers, not to employ them. Cayenne is nevertheless the capital of the penal colony. (...) Finally, I arrived at the camp. The labour camp. Not a machine for producing well defined, regulated, uniform punishment. A factory churning out misery without rhyme or reason. One would search in vain for any mould to shape the prisoners. It crushes them, that's all, and the pieces go where they may.

(Au bagne, 1923)

And the article continued: "I was taken to these places. I was taken aback by the novelty of the fact. I had never before seen fifty men in a cage. [...] They were getting ready for night. The place was swarming with them. They were free from five in the evening until five in the morning – inside their cage."

Londres also denounced "doubling". "When a man is sentenced to five to seven years forced labour, once the sentence is completed, he must stay in Guyana for the same number of years. If the sentence is more than seven years, he must stay there for the rest of his life. How many jurors know that? The penal colony starts with freedom. During their sentence they are fed (badly), they are housed (badly), they are clothed (badly). A brilliant minimum when one considers what happens afterwards. Their five to seven years complete, they are shown the door, and that's it."

During his stay in French Guiana, he visited Marie Bartête who was sentenced on 4 June 1888 for shoplifting. In 1938, Bartête would become the last woman to die in prison in the penal colony.

In 1924 he investigated forced labour in North Africa, where military prisons welcomed convicts of courts-martial.

He became interested in the Tour de France, which he saw as pitiless and intolerable physical exertion in this "Tour of Suffering", and criticised the rules. (Les Forçats de la route (The convicts of the road) and Tour de France, tour de souffrance (Tour de France, Tour of Suffering))

His next topic was the lunatic asylum. He exposed abuse of medication, sanitary and nutritional incompetence, and reminded readers that "Our duty is not to rid ourselves of the mad, but to rid the mad of their madness." (Chez les fous (With the Mad))

In 1928, still with the Petit Parisien, he travelled to Senegal and French Congo, and discovered that railway construction and exploitation of the forests was causing deaths among African workers. In particular, Londres’s journalism brought to light the brutality and extraordinary loss of life on the construction site of the Congo–Ocean Railway, connecting Brazzaville to Pointe-Noire. "They are the negroes of the negroes. The masters no longer have the right to sell them. Instead they simply exchange them. Above all they make them have sons. The slave is no longer bought, he is born." He concluded with a critique of French policy in Africa, which he compares negatively, with the British or Belgium colonialism. (Terre d'ébène (Land of Ebony) )

In 1929, while anti-Semitism was rife in Europe, he went to Palestine. He met the Jewish community and came face to face with an outcast people. He declared himself in favour of the creation of a Jewish state, but doubted peace between the Jews and the Arabs. "The demographic imbalance presages difficult days ahead: 700,000 Arabs versus 150,000 Jews" (Le Juif errant est arrivé (The Wandering Jew has come home)).

In 1929, Londres was in Jeddah when the Fabre Line steamship Asia caught fire, killing more than 100 Hajj pilgrims. He hired a dhow to take him out into the roadstead to witness the fire and rescue, on which he then wrote a report.

He next went to the Balkans to investigate the terrorist actions of the Bulgarian Komitadjis from Internal Macedonian Revolutionary Organization (IMRO). This was to be his last completed report, but it would never be published.

=== Death ===
On 16 May, 1932, Londres was a passenger aboard the French ocean liner Georges Philippar, on a voyage from China back to France, when it caught fire in the Gulf of Aden. As the ship's passengers and crew attempted a chaotic evacuation, Londres was last seen by Maurice Sadorge, the second engineering officer, trying to climb out of a porthole to escape the ship. Sadorge attempted to lower a fire hose for him to grab onto, but Londres was unable to hold on and fell. His body was never recovered, and his notes were destroyed in the fire.

== Cultural impact ==
Londres almost certainly was an inspiration to Belgian cartoonist Hergé, who created the fictional investigative journalist Tintin. Hergé worked at a busy newspaper and would have read of Londres' adventures.

== Works ==
Poetry

- Suivant les heures, 1904
- L'Âme qui vibre, 1908
- Le poème effréné including Lointaine and La marche à l'étoile, 1911

Reports and investigations

- Au bagne (1923)
- Dante n'avait rien vu (1924)
- Chez les fous (1925)
- La Chine en folie (1925)
- Le Chemin de Buenos Aires (1927)
- Marseille, porte du sud (1927)
- Figures de nomades (1928)
- L'Homme qui s'évada (1928)
- Terre d'ébène (1929)
- The Wandering Jew Has Arrived (1929)
- Le Juif errant est arrivé (1930)
- Pêcheurs de perles (1931)
- Les Comitadjis ou le terrorisme dans les Balkans (1932)
- Histoires des grands chemins (1932)
- Mourir pour Shanghai (1984, texts on the Sino-Japanese War in 1932)
- Si je t'oublie, Constantinople (1985, texts on the War in the Dardanelles in 1915–17)
- En Bulgarie (1989)
- D'Annunzio, conquérant de Fiume (1990)
- Dans la Russie des soviets (1996)
- Les forçats de la route / Tour de France, tour de souffrance (1996)
- Contre le bourrage de crâne (1997)
- Visions orientales (2002, texts on Japan and China written in 1922)

== Albert Londres Prize ==
- Jean-Michel Caradec'h, 1984
- Marie-Monique Robin, 1995
- Jean-Paul Mari, 1987
- Sorj Chalandon, 1988
- Jean Rolin, 1989
- Olivier Weber, 1992
- Alfred de Montesquiou, 2012

== Bibliography ==
- Walter Redfern, Writing On the Move : Albert Londres and Investigative Journalism, – Oxford; Bern; Berlin; Brussels; Frankfurt am Main; New York; Wien: Lang, 2004
