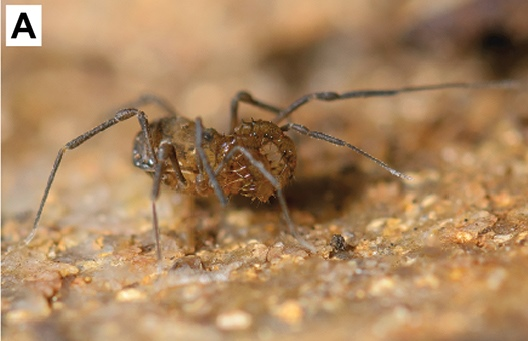
- Theromaster brunneus

Scientific classification
- Kingdom: Animalia
- Phylum: Arthropoda
- Subphylum: Chelicerata
- Class: Arachnida
- Order: Opiliones
- Family: Travuniidae
- Subfamily: Cladonychiinae
- Genus: Theromaster; Briggs, 1969

= Theromaster =

Genus of harvestmen/daddy longlegs

Theromaster is a genus of armoured harvestmen in the family Cladonychiidae. There are at least two described species in Theromaster, found in the eastern United States.

== Species ==
These two species belong to the genus Theromaster:

- Theromaster archeri (Goodnight & Goodnight, 1942)
- Theromaster brunneus (Banks, 1902)
