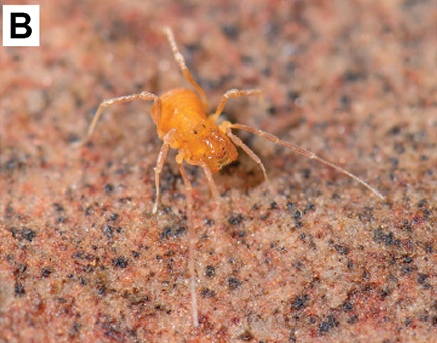
- Erebomaster sp.

Scientific classification
- Domain: Eukaryota
- Kingdom: Animalia
- Phylum: Arthropoda
- Subphylum: Chelicerata
- Class: Arachnida
- Order: Opiliones
- Family: Cladonychiidae
- Genus: Erebomaster; Cope, 1872

Synonyms
- Phalangomma Roewer, 1949

= Erebomaster =

Genus of harvestmen/daddy longlegs

Erebomaster is a genus of armoured harvestmen in the family Travuniidae. There are at least three described species in Erebomaster.

== Species ==
These three species belong to the genus Erebomaster:

- Erebomaster acanthinus (Crosby & Bishop, 1924)
- Erebomaster flavescens Cope, 1872
- Erebomaster weyerensis (Packard, 1888)
