= Denis Donaldson =

Irish republican (1950–2006)

- Donaldson, early 2000s
- Born: 1950; Belfast, Northern Ireland
- Died: 4 April 2006 (aged 55–56); Glenties, County Donegal, Republic of Ireland
- Known for: Sinn Féin informer
- Notable work: Friends of Sinn Féin

Denis Martin Donaldson (1950 – 4 April 2006) was a member of the Provisional Irish Republican Army (IRA) and Sinn Féin. He was killed following his exposure in December 2005 as an informer in the employ of MI5 and the Special Branch of the Police Service of Northern Ireland (formerly the Royal Ulster Constabulary). While it was initially believed that the IRA were responsible for his killing, the Real IRA claimed responsibility three years later.

His friendship with French writer and journalist Sorj Chalandon inspired two novels: My Traitor (published 2007) and Return to Killybegs (published 2011).

== Paramilitary and political career ==
Donaldson had a long history of involvement in Irish republicanism. He joined the IRA in the mid-1960s while still in his teens, well before the start of the Troubles. According to a former friend, Sinn Féin activist Jim Gibney, writing in the Irish News, he was a local hero in Short Strand in 1970 because he took part in the gun battle at St Matthew's chapel between Ulster loyalists and Irish nationalists.

Donaldson was a friend of IRA hunger striker Bobby Sands and the two men served time together in Long Kesh for paramilitary offences in the 1970s. Donaldson was accused by an unnamed republican source of being part of the IRA team that carried out the La Mon restaurant bombing in 1978, one of the most notorious bomb attacks of the Troubles.

In 1981, he was arrested by French authorities at Orly airport along with fellow IRA man William "Blue" Kelly; they were using false passports and Donaldson said that they were returning from a guerrilla training camp in Lebanon. At the 1983 general election, Donaldson was the Sinn Féin candidate in Belfast East, but only polled 682 votes. In the late 1980s, he travelled to Lebanon again and held talks with Lebanese Shia militias Hezbollah and Amal in an effort to secure the freedom of Irish hostage Brian Keenan.

As the Sinn Féin leadership under Gerry Adams and Martin McGuinness turned toward a peace process strategy, Donaldson was dispatched to New York City, where he helped establish Friends of Sinn Féin, an organisation that solicited mainstream political and financial support for the new strategy while attempting to isolate hard-line activists in Irish Northern Aid and other support organisations in the United States. Martin Galvin, a Bronx-based Irish-American attorney and future dissident republican, later claimed that he had warned the republican movement's leadership that he suspected Donaldson of being a British government informer.

In the early 2000s, Donaldson was appointed Sinn Féin's Northern Ireland Assembly group administrator in Parliament Buildings.

In October 2002, he was arrested in a raid on the Sinn Féin offices as part of a high-profile Police Service of Northern Ireland investigation into an alleged republican spy ring during the Stormontgate affair.

== Exposure and death ==
=== Background and killing ===
On 16 December 2005, it was reported that the Public Prosecution Service for Northern Ireland had dropped the espionage charges against Donaldson and two other men on the grounds it would not be in the public interest to proceed with the case. On the same day, Sinn Féin president Gerry Adams announced to a press conference in Dublin that Donaldson had been an MI5 agent. This was confirmed by Donaldson in a statement which he read out on Irish state broadcaster RTÉ shortly afterward. According to a British agent known as "Martin", prominent South Armagh republicans blamed Donaldson for IRA operations which had been compromised and suspected he had planted covert listening devices which they had found. Donaldson stated that he was recruited after compromising himself during a vulnerable time in his life, but did not specify why he was vulnerable or why he would risk his life as an intelligence agent for MI5 in a heavily republican area such as West Belfast.

On 19 March 2006, Hugh Jordan, a journalist for the Sunday World, tracked Donaldson down to an isolated pre-Famine cottage near Glenties, County Donegal. The dwelling had not been modernised and so there was no running water or electricity.

On 4 April 2006, Donaldson was found shot dead inside a cottage where he had been living for several months, and which was owned by a relative. Chief Superintendent Terry McGinn of the Garda Síochána said they had been aware of his presence since January and they had warned him of a threat to his life. However, he did not ask for special protection. The cottage was located in the townland of Classey, 8 km (5 miles) from the village of Glenties on the road to Doochary. The last person with whom he is believed to have spoken was Tim Cranley, a census taker, who spoke to him in the cottage around 8:30 pm on the previous day. His body was found by Gardaí after a passer-by reported seeing a broken window and a smashed-in door.

=== Reaction ===
A statement by Northern Ireland Secretary Peter Hain referred to his killing as a "barbaric act", while Taoiseach Bertie Ahern condemned "the brutal murder" of Donaldson. Two shotgun cartridges were found at the threshold of the cottage and a post mortem revealed that he had died from a shotgun blast to the chest. The Republic's Minister for Justice, Equality and Law Reform Michael McDowell initially said that Donaldson had been shot in the head, and his right hand was also badly damaged by gunshot.

The Provisional IRA issued a one-line statement saying that it had "no involvement whatsoever" with the murder. The murder was also condemned by Sinn Féin leader Gerry Adams. The Democratic Unionist Party leader Ian Paisley blamed republicans for the killing, saying that "eyes will be turned towards IRA/Sinn Féin on this issue".

In May 2005, McDowell claimed to a US Special Envoy to Northern Ireland that he believed the outing of Donaldson as an informant was a message from the British government that it had another, more valuable, informant within the republican leadership. On 8 April 2006 Donaldson was buried in Belfast City Cemetery, rather than at Milltown Cemetery, the more common burial place for republicans.

=== Investigation ===
In February 2009, Gardaí announced they had a new lead in the inquiry into his death. On 12 April 2009, the Real IRA claimed responsibility for his death.

In April 2016 two men, Patrick Gillespie (aged 74 at the time) and another man (in his 40s), were detained under the Republic's Offences Against the State Act. They were held in Letterkenny station and questioned. The man in his 40s was released without charge but Gillespie was charged with having in his possession information regarding the involvement of another person in Donaldson's killing, was granted bail and awaited trial.

In 2019, Gardaí announced they would be charging a man with the murder of Donaldson, but did not release the name.

=== Arrest of Antoin Duffy ===
On 31 March 2026, 49-year-old Kincasslagh native Antoin Duffy was extradited from Scotland (where he recently finished serving a 17 year prison sentence for conspiracy to murder former Ulster Defence Association commander Johnny Adair) and brought before the Special Criminal Court to be charged with Donaldson's murder. Duffy was also charged with the attempted murder of Liam Copeland McGinley in November 2007, as well as the possession of firearms and ammunition with the intent to endanger life during both incidents. Duffy was then remanded in custody to face trial.

=== Defamation case ===
On 20 September 2016, BBC Northern Ireland's Spotlight aired a programme in which a British spy (known only as "Martin") who had infiltrated the IRA claimed that Thomas “Slab” Murphy and other leading South Armagh Republicans had demanded the killing of Donaldson and that it would have been sanctioned by Gerry Adams. The agent stated, "I know from my experience in the IRA that murders have to be approved by the leadership". When he was asked specifically who he was referring to, he went on: "Gerry Adams, he gives the final say." 'Martin' also dismissed claims the Real IRA was responsible for Donaldson's killing, saying they made the claim "for the kudos, a forlorn hope that someone might take them more seriously these days".

On 23 September, the solicitor of the Donaldson family after speaking with senior members of the Gardaí said that the allegation was "absolute nonsense" and also that "It does not marry in any way with the lines of inquiry that have been progressed by the Garda or by the police ombudsman." Adams's solicitor also denied his client had any knowledge or involvement in the killing.

A Real IRA army council member also denied the claim, he said "Let me be clear about this. A claim of responsibility was made by (the Real IRA) in 2009 and it was correct. Gerry Adams had absolutely nothing to do with the execution of British agent Denis Donaldson. The Provisional IRA wasn't involved in any shape or form. I don't know why allegations that the Provos did it are now being made but they are totally untrue."

In 2025, Gerry Adams was awarded €100,000 by an Irish court after it judged that the Spotlight programme had defamed him. The BBC protested against the decision, stating that it could hinder freedom of expression.
