= Return to Killybegs =

2011 novel by Sorj Chalandon

- First edition cover
- Author: Sorj Chalandon
- Original title: Retour à Killybegs
- Language: French
- Publisher: Éditions Grasset
- Publication date: 17 August 2011
- Publication place: France
- Pages: 333
- ISBN: 978-2-246-78569-9

Return to Killybegs (French: Retour à Killybegs) is a 2011 novel by the French writer Sorj Chalandon. The narrative is inspired by the 2006 murder of Denis Donaldson, a senior Sinn Féin member who was revealed as a British secret agent. Chalandon had befriended Donaldson while working as a journalist in Belfast. His 2008 novel My Traitor was also inspired by the Donaldson case.

Return to Killybegs was published by Éditions Grasset on 17 August 2011. It received the Grand Prix du roman de l'Académie française. In 2013 it was translated into English by Ursula Meany Scott and published by The Lilliput Press. In 2014 it was translated into Catalan by Edicions de 1984.

== See also ==
- 2011 in literature
- Contemporary French literature
