= Woman at Sea =

- Poster
- Directed by: Dinara Drukarova
- Screenplay by: Dinara Drukarova; Raphëlle Desplechin; Léa Fehner; Gilles Taurand
- Based on: Le Grand Marin by Catherine Poulain
- Produced by: Marianne Slot; Carine LeBlanc
- Starring: Dinara Drukarova; Sam Louwyck
- Cinematography: Timo Salminen
- Edited by: Valérie Loiseleux; Anita Roth
- Music by: Jean-Benoît Dunckel
- Production companies: Slot Machine; Rouge International; Arte France Cinéma; Gulldrengurinn; Mystery Productions; Scope Pictures; Rezo Productions
- Release dates: September 2022 (San Sebastián International Film Festival); 11 January 2023 (France)
- Running time: 84 minutes
- Countries: France; Iceland; Belgium; Russia
- Languages: French; English; Icelandic

Woman at Sea (French: Grand marin) is a 2022 drama film directed by Dinara Drukarova in her directorial debut and starring herself and Sam Louwyck. The film was featured at the 2022 San Sebastián International Film Festival's New Directors competition.

== Plot ==
French woman Lily leaves behind everything and sails in the North Sea. She seeks work in a fishing harbor and only a Frenchman, Ian, the captain of a fishing trawler will let her join his crew. The film follows Lily as she wins over the respect of Ian's crew through confidence despite her frail appearance and earns the name Sparrow for being the only woman on board. She is medically evacuated after an accident packing fish and returns to the boat when another crew member is dismissed. Ian suggests that she marry to obtain permanent residence, but she is unwilling. After the boat reaches its quota, the crew disperses, but Lily remains in the fishing town.

== Cast ==
- Dinara Drukarova as Lili
- Sam Louwyck as Ian
- Björn Hlynur Haraldsson as Jude
- Hjörtur Jóhann Jónsson as David
- Dylan Robert as Simon
- Antonythasan Jesuthasan as Jesus
- Magne-Håvard Brekke as Kris

== Production ==
After reading the book Le Grand Marin by Catherine Poulain, Dinara Drukarova decided to make it into a film. The original story is set in Alaska, but the Indian reservation that they were going to film on was closed due to the COVID-19 pandemic. The original producer left the film, and French company Slot Machine joined the film. Since French companies have to shoot at least 50% of the film in French, Iceland was chosen as the place for filming. The film was shot in Iceland for five months starting in January 2021 when everything was closed during the pandemic.

== Reception ==
A critic from Cineuropa wrote that "It’s a simple and stripped-back debut feature film which provides a wonderful role for its director, who has, herself, gathered together a cast composed of various nationalities [...] who are perfectly at ease in this Icelandic environment, venerating nature in all its forms". A critic from Les Echos wrote that despite its easy script and narrative twists that sometimes seem artificial, this fiery first film proves that Dinara Drukarova is not only a talented actress, but also, already, an inspired director. A critic from Paris Match wrote that the argument is thin but the pleasure is elsewhere, in the description of a small community of fishermen and especially in the beauty of the Icelandic villages and landscapes immortalized in Scope by the Finnish cinematographer Timo Salminen. A critic from Première rated the film three out of five and wrote that this portrait of a woman never reveals all her secrets, lets the viewer fill in the blanks, stays at a good distance from the intimate wounds and the inability of its heroine to say things. A critic from Les Inrockuptibles wrote that "we never truly feel this sense of adventure, as cruel and physical as it may be, nor the salt that eats away at the skin, nor the exhausting sleepless nights or the devouring humidity of the heart of the ocean".
