= Catherine Poulain =

French writer (born 1960)

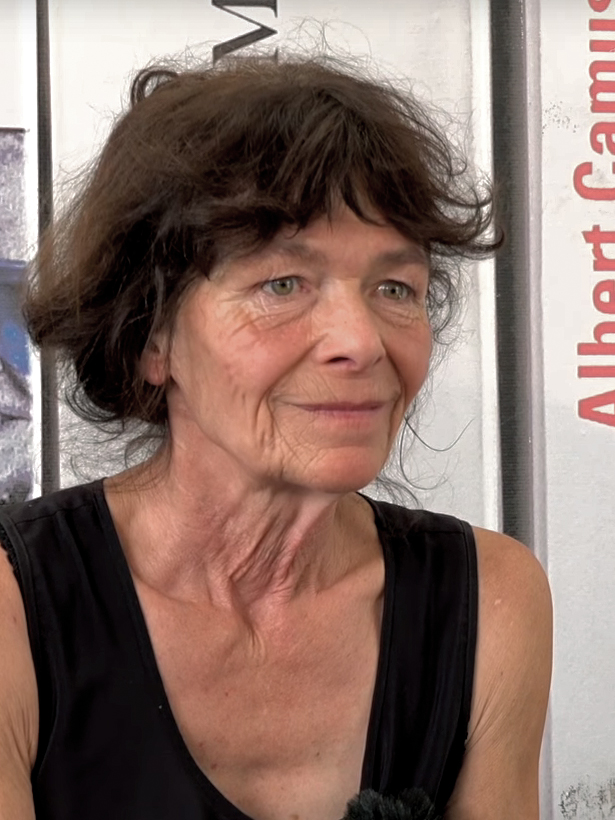
Catherine Poulain (2018)

Catherine Poulain (born 1960) is a French writer.

== Life ==
Born in Barr, Poulain left France at the age of twenty and travelled on various continents. She arrived in Quebec in 1987, then settled in Alaska where she worked as a fisherman for ten years before being deported in 2003 by the American immigration services for illegal work.

A few years after her return to France - where she lived from various agricultural works in Provence and the Alps - Poulain drew on her overseas experiences to help write her first novel, Le Grand Marin (Woman at Sea), which was described as a wild, gripping story of one woman’s battle with the elements on board an Alaskan fishing boat. It became a best-seller (70,000 copies sold in the months following its publication) and was awarded numerous literary prizes in 2016, including the Prix Joseph-Kessel, and the Ouest France Prize Étonnants Voyageurs. Poulain was also a finalist for the Prix Goncourt du Premier Roman, but was beaten by four votes to five by Joseph Andras

Her second novel, Le Cœur blanc, was selected for the Prix Décembre 2018.

== Works ==
- 2016: Le Grand Marin, Éditions de l'Olivier ISBN 978-2823608632 – prix Joseph-Kessel and eleven other maritime or travel writer literary prizes.
- 2018: Le Cœur blanc, Éditions de l'Olivier ISBN 978-2-8236-1359-9
