= Christophe Bataille =

French writer

- Born: 4 October 1971 (age 54); Versailles, France
- Education: HEC Paris
- Occupation: Author

Christophe Bataille, born 1971, is a French writer.

== Biography ==
After studying management at HEC Paris, Christophe Bataille worked for two years in London in cooperation for L'Oréal. It was there that he wrote his second novel, Absinthe, following the success of the first, Annam, which was well received by critics.

Back in Paris, he changed careers in 1995 and moved into the world of publishing at Grasset while he continued to write at night.

Since January 2007, he has supported Bibliothèques Sans Frontières, a NGO which aims to facilitate access to knowledge in developing countries.

== Works ==
- 1993: Annam, éditions Arléa – Prix du premier roman and Prix des Deux Magots.
- 1994: Absinthe, Arléa, 1994 – Prix littéraire de la vocation
- 1997: Le Maître des heures, Éditions Grasset
- 1999: Vive l'enfer, Grasset
- 2002: J'envie la félicité des bêtes, Grasset,
- 2006: Quartier général du bruit, Grasset
- 2008: Le Rêve de Machiavel, Grasset
- 2012: L'Élimination cowritten with Rithy Panh, Grasset, ISBN 978-2246772811 – Prix Essai France Télévisions, Prix Aujourd'hui, Prix Joseph-Kessel and Prix livre et droits de l'homme de la Ville de Nancy, all won in 2012
- L'image Manquante, film by Rithy Panh whose off voice he wrote as a poem - Prize "Un Certain Regard" au 66e festival de Cannes
- L'Expérience, Grasset
