= Olivier Weber =

French writer (born 1958)

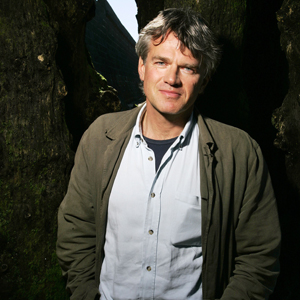
- Born: Olivier Weber; 1958 (age 67–68); Montluçon, France
- Occupation: Writer
- Writing career
- Period: 1992–present
- Genres: Novel, essay, travel writing
- Subjects: Exile, migration, ecology, faith, childhood
- Notable works: Le Barbaresque, Le Faucon afghan, Les Impunis
- Notable awards: Joseph Kessel Prize, Albert Londres Prize, Amerigo Vespucci Prize, European and Mediterranean book prize, Pierre Loti Prize

Olivier Weber (born 1958) is a French writer, novelist and reporter at large, known primarily for his coverage of the wars in Iraq and Afghanistan. He has been a war correspondent for twenty-five years, especially in Central Asia, Africa, Middle-East and Iraq. He is an assistant professor at the Institut d'études politiques de Paris, president of the Prize Joseph Kessel and today ambassador of France at large. Weber has won several national and international awards of literature and journalism, in particular for his stories on Afghanistan and for his books on wars. His novels, travels writing books and essays have been translated in a dozen of languages.

== Biography ==
Weber, born in 1958 in Montluçon, studied economics and anthropology at the University of San Francisco, University of Paris Sorbonne, University of Nice (PhD) and at the National Institute of Oriental Languages and Civilizations (Institut National des Langues et Civilisations Orientales, INALCO). He won the Albert Londres Prize and Joseph Kessel Prize for his reports on wars and books.

== The guerrilla years ==
Assistant professor at the Institut d'études politiques de Paris (Sciences-Po), he began his career in journalism in California. Then he was sent in Africa for the French daily Liberation, to cover several wars and conflicts. He joined the French weekly Le Point as a journalist and later was appointed foreign correspondent. As a war correspondent, he has traveled with dozens of guerrillas and armed movements. He has covered around twenty wars and conflicts, including wars and armed conflicts in Afghanistan, Iraq, Burma, Kurdistan, Chechnya, Israel, the Palestinian territories, Chad, Pakistan, Kashmir, Algeria, Iran, Armenia, Russia, Kosovo, Sri Lanka, Western Sahara, East Timor, and Eritrea. He has interviewed among others the Dalai Lama, Aung San Suu Kyi, Indian President Rajiv Gandhi, Pakistani Prime Minister Benazir Bhutto, Pakistani President Pervez Musharraf, Turkish President Recep Tayyip Erdogan, Commander Ahmad Shah Massoud, Iraki President Jalal Talabani, Philippines President Corazon Aquino, President of the Iraqi Kurdistan Region Massud Barzani and Afghan President Hamid Karzai.

His style as a writer is sometimes compared to that of Conrad, Chatwin and Cendrars. He has traveled the world, from the United States to China and from Africa to the East, which became his passion. He brought from these trips and stays several stories, surveys and novels, including Dragon Hunters: Opiomistan trip, and The White Death on the world of drug dealers.

== The committed writer ==
Committed writer, Olivier Weber has written on a lot of lost causes and indigenous people. He has defended in particular the resistance of South Sudan and has denounced the slavery of Sudanese children.

He participated at the operations of saving the boat people, in the China Sea, with volunteers of the international NGO Doctors of the World (Médecins du Monde). He has also defended the Afghan mujahideen during the war against the Soviet army and then against the pro-communist regime of Najibullah and had traveled several times with the rebels and Commander Massoud. After criticizing the regime of the Taliban, he was expelled from Afghanistan by the militias of Mollah Umar.

His denunciation of human trafficking by the Tamil Tigers of Sri Lanka and disposal of their prisoners, after several trips to the bush, brought him new threats. The plane he was to take from Jaffna to Colombo was deliberately shot down by fighters of the armed movement. Following an expedition with one of the Burmese guerrillas, he met secretly in Rangoon the opposition leader Aung San Suu Kyi.

After winning the award Joseph-Kessel Prize, he was nominated president of the prize in 2001.

In August 2001, he traveled to Central Asia to launch a humanitarian mission in the Panjshir Valley and bring to Ahmad Shah Massoud proofs of his book The Afghan Hawk. A few days later, 9 September 2001, two days before the attacks on the World Trade Center, the Lion of Panjshir was assassinated by two terrorists of Al-Qaeda. Olivier Weber was to attend his funeral, when the Taliban launched a major offensive. His testimony and his denunciation of the Taliban regime and the rise of Al-Qaeda in Afghanistan, Pakistan and Central Asia have earned him death threats. He has published several books on Central Asia and the Silk Road: The Great Feast of the East, The Afghan Hawk: a journey to the land of the Taliban, Memory Murdered, Road of Drugs, The White Death.

He has denounced the impunity of the Khmer Rouge in the mountains of western Cambodia, after meeting the underground movement leaders Ieng Sary and Khieu Samphan, both former deputies of Pol Pot.

In May 2009, he presented the Joseph-Kessel Prize to the writer and member of the Académie française Érik Orsenna for his fight for water and his latest book.

The film of his book Cursed for Gold (La Fièvre de l'or), a travelogue on human trafficking in the Amazon and other traffickings related to deforestation and the massacre of Native Americans, was the subject of remarkable press and has been described as a witness in the vein of Darwin's Nightmare and Blood Diamond.

His essay on Joseph Kessel, "Kessel, The Eternal Nomad", highlights the commitment of the reporter and member of the French Academy. He has also written the biographies of Joseph Conrad, Jack London and Ella Maillart.

He is a member of the Albert Londres Award's jury. Author and writer of documentaries, he is also editor of the series "Writers travelers".

== The ambassador ==
Olivier Weber was nominated in 2008 to be ambassador of France at large, in charge of human trafficking and human rights. He has done several dozens of missions for this task in Asia, Africa, Central America, Middle East, and advocates at the tribune of the United Nations mainly on human trafficking, child soldiers, fight against drugs, civil society and human rights.

He is a lecturer (maître de conférences) at the Institute of Political Studies of Paris (Institut d'études politiques de Paris or Sciences-Po), where he teaches the guerrilla warfare. He has completed from 1983 to 2011 more than 20 terrain-researches as a war observer in countries like Afghanistan, Iraq, Algeria, Syria, Erytrea, Sudan, Iran, Sri Lanka, Azerbaijan, Tajikistan.

He has received several awards and prizes of literature and journalism, among them the prestigious Albert Londres Prize, considered the French Pulitzer prize, for his articles and reports. and the Joseph Kessel Prize for his books. He is a selection committee member for literature awards and member of the Société des explorateurs français.

== Literature and journalism prizes and awards ==
- Prize Lazareff 1991
- Prix Albert Londres 1992
- Special Prize of War correspondents 1997
- Second Prize of War correspondents 1997
- Prize Joseph Kessel 1998
- Prize Mumm 1999
- Prize of Adventure 1999
- Graduate of the Foundation Journalist Tomorrow
- Prize of the FIPA (International Festival of Audiovisual Programmes) 2001
- Laureate of Audiovisual 2001
- Prize Louis Pauwels 2002 for Le Faucon afghan, voyage au pays des talibans
- Special Prize of the International Festival of News Reporting (Festival international de grand reportage d'actualités) 2003
- Prize of the Public of the International Festival of News Reporting (Festival international de grand reportage d'actualités) 2003
- Prize Cabourg 2004
- Prize of the Academy of Vichy 2005
- Laureate of the fellowship "Writers Stendhal", 2001 and 2005
- Trophy of the Adventure for the film Cursed for Gold (La Fièvre de l'or), adapted from his book I will have gold (J'aurai de l'or) on Amazonia, 2008
- Chevalier de la Légion d'honneur en 2009
- Prize Terra Festival 2010
- Prize Amerigo Vespucci 2011 for Le Barbaresque
- Prize of the Novelists 2016
- Special Prize of the International Adventure Film Festival, La Rochelle, 2017
- Jury Prize, Meeting of Adventure, 2017
- Prize of the European and Mediterranean Book 2017
- Pierre Loti Prize, 2023, for Au royaume de la lumière: Un de voyage en Himalaya

== Novels, essays and travel writing books ==
- Angels and ogres (Calmann-Lévy, 2026)
- My life with Gerard de Nerval (Gallimard, 2024)
- A Lover’s Dictionary of adventure (Plon, 2024)
- In the eye of the archangel, Life and death of Gerda Taro, (Dans l'oeil de l'archange) (Calmann-Lévy, 2023)
- Birth of a European Nation - Reflections on the Ukrainian Question (Naissance d'une nation européenne- Réflexions sur la question ukrainienne)(Aube, 2022)
- Massoud, the murdered rebel (Massoud, le rebelle assassiné (Aube, 2021)
- In the Kingdom of Light, A travel in Himalaya (Au Royaume de la lumière) (Terre Humaine, 2020).
- If I forget you Kurdistan (Si je t'oublie Kurdistan) (Aube, 2020)
- The Hinterland (L'Arrière-pays) (Calmann-Lévy, 2020)
- Borders (Frontières) (Paulsen, 2016)
- Jack London, The Call of the big spleen dreams (Paulsen, 2016)
- The Enchantment of the World (L'Enchantement du monde) (Flammarion, 2015)
- Massoud's Confession (La Confession de Massoud) (Flammarion, 2013)
- The Unpunished, A travel in the banality of evil (Les Impunis) (Robert Laffont, 2013)
- The Barbary Corsair (Le Barbaresque) (Flammarion, 2011)
- Conrad, the Traveller of concern (Arthaud-Flammarion, 2011)
- I will have gold (J'aurai de l'or) (Robert Laffont, 2008)
- Is Tibet a lost cause? (Le Tibet est-il une cause perdue?), (Larousse, 2008)
- The White Death (La mort blanche) (Albin Michel, 2007)
- On the Silk Roads (Sur les routes de la soie) (avec Reza, (Hoëbeke, 2007)
- Kessel, the eternal nomad (Kessel, le nomade éternel) (Arthaud, 2006)
- The Angels battle (La Bataille des anges) (Albin Michel, 2006)
- The Big Feast of the East (Le grand festin de l'Orient) (Robert Laffont, 2004)
- Memory murdered (La Mémoire assassinée) (Mille et une nuits, 2004)
- I am from nowhere: on the tracks of Ella Maillart (Je suis de nulle part : sur les traces d’Ella Maillart), (Éditions Payot, 2003)
- Humanitaires (Le Félin, 2002)
- La mémoire assassinée (Mille et Une Nuits, 2001)
- Le faucon afghan : un voyage au pays des talibans (Robert Laffont, 2001)
- On ne se tue pas pour une femme (Plon, 2000)
- Dragon Hunters: a stay in Opiumistan (Chasseurs de dragons : voyage en Opiomie) (Payot), 2000)
- The Slave children (Les Enfants esclaves) (Mille et une nuits, 1999)
- Lucien Bodard, un aventurier dans le siècle (Plon, 1997)
- Road of drugs (La route de la drogue) (Arléa, 1996)
- French doctors : L’épopée des hommes et des femmes qui ont inventé la médecine humanitaire (Robert Laffont, 1995)
- Voyage au pays de toutes les Russies (Éditions Quai Voltaire, 1992)

== Filmography ==
Olivier Weber is the author, director and screenwriter of several films for television and theater, in particular on travels and on writers.

- Documentary : Sudan: The Slave Children, France 2, 1998
- Documentary : The Opium of talibans, French channels and theaters, 2001, Special Prize of FIPA
- Documentary : Return to Cambodia, France 5, 2002[53],
- Documentary : On the road of Ganga, Arte, 2003, prize of the Public of FIGRA and Prize of Image of Figra
- Documentary : On the road of Nile, France 5, 2007
- Documentary : The People of Opium (Le Peuple de l'opium), Canal Plus, 2007
- Documentary : Cursed for Gold (La Fièvre de l'Or), Canal Plus and France 2, in French theaters in October 2008
- Documentary : Blood-red Gemstones, (Les Rubis des khmers rouges), France 2, 2011
- Documentary : The World seen from the train, French channels, 2010–2016
- Documentary : Beyond the light, France 3, 2017
- Documentary : Mustang, France 5 and Voyage, 2020.
