= Stormontgate =

Northern Ireland political scandal

The name is derived from Stormont, the common name for the parliament buildings of Northern Ireland, with the "gate" suffix applied to many political scandals after Watergate

Stormontgate was a political scandal in Northern Ireland, over an alleged Provisional Irish Republican Army spy ring and intelligence-gathering operation based in Stormont. The term was coined after the arrest of Sinn Féin's Northern Ireland Assembly group administrator Denis Donaldson, his son-in-law Ciarán Kearney, and former porter William Mackessy for intelligence-gathering on 4 October 2002. The charges were dropped in December 2005, after it was determined that Donaldson had been an MI5 spy working to support Ulster Unionist Party leader David Trimble; any IRA spy ring was fictitious. Donaldson publicly admitted this later that month and moved to Donegal, where he was assassinated in April 2006.

Donaldson's actions succeeded in collapsing Stormont for five years, the longest such suspension in its post-1998 history. He acknowledged that he failed to save Trimble's career however, which had been his main goal. The devolved administration at Stormont returned after the St Andrews Agreement and 2007 assembly election. The British government declined to hold a public inquiry into the scandal.

== Background ==
Denis Donaldson had been an IRA member in the 1960s, and later joined Sinn Féin. He was also however working for the British secret service agency MI5, along with the Royal Ulster Constabulary for approximately two decades prior to the scandal. During some work with NORAID in New York in the early 1990s, Martin Galvin became concerned he might be an agent. He nonetheless remained undetected within Sinn Féin into the early 2000s, when he was appointed Northern Ireland Assembly group administrator for the party. Several senior figures remarked that he was considered trustworthy, many had no suspicion that he was an informant.

== Raid and investigation ==
The Police Service of Northern Ireland began a series of raids at 05:00 AM on 4 October 2002. The first of these targeted homes of people connected to Sinn Féin, including community activists across Belfast, and involved the arrest of Denis Donaldson. The largest raid was at the Sinn Féin offices in Stormont, where 10 officers arrived at 08:00 AM without a warrant and were initially denied entry. The warrant was later obtained and the search of the office commenced at 09:45. The group had not been trained to conduct a search and did not know which part of the building that they needed to investigate; they simply attempted a "full search". A second group of 15 officers with the proper training arrived later that morning. A Sinn Féin worker alleged assault by a police officer during the raid, stating that the officer slammed a door on his leg repeatedly. No disciplinary measures were taken against the officer owing to a lack of evidence.

Three men were charged- Denis Donaldson, his son-in-law Ciaran Kearney and a civil servant William Mackessy- with spying for the IRA. The IRA stated in the immediate aftermath that the ceasefire remained intact. Ten days after the arrests, devolved government in Northern Ireland collapsed.

Police conduct during the raid was investigated in 2004 by Nuala O'Loan, the Northern Ireland Police Ombudsman, who ruled that the raid was not politically motivated. O'Loan found that the "decision to seek a warrant authorising a search of a specific desk in the Sinn Féin offices was reasonable, proportionate and legal" but was critical of the number of vehicles used, the scale of the police operation, and the lack of police training. Concerns were also raised about the police wielding automatic weapons in front of children during the early morning home searches.

=== Revelation of MI5 involvement and dropping of charges ===
On 8 December 2005 the charges against all three men were dropped by the Northern Ireland Public Prosecution Service. Lawyers for the service said that "the prosecution for the offences in relation to the accused are no longer in the public interest". Sinn Féin claimed that the prosecutions had been politically motivated and were dropped because of lack of evidence.

On 16 December 2005, Sinn Féin president Gerry Adams announced to a press conference in Dublin that Donaldson had been a spy in the pay of MI5 for over twenty years. This was confirmed by Donaldson in a statement to broadcast media outlet RTÉ shortly afterwards. In his statement Donaldson described the alleged Sinn Féin spy ring in Stormont as "a scam and a fiction". Adams asserted that both the planned leaking of Donaldson's name as an informer and the original Stormontgate allegations were engineered by the security forces to discredit Sinn Féin and cause a crisis in the peace process. Donaldson fled Belfast in the wake of the revelations.

== Aftermath ==
=== Political reactions ===
Both the Irish and British governments ruled out inquiries into the controversy. Tánaiste Mary Harney said: "I think the last thing we probably need right now is some form of inquiry which may not get very far". The Secretary of State for Northern Ireland, Peter Hain, described the unfolding scandal as turbulent, but said that inquiries "cost hundreds of millions of pounds. I am not going down that road when it is quite clear that it is not in the public interest to do so. Taoiseach Bertie Ahern described events surrounding the incident as "bizarre".

=== Sunday World interview ===
Immediately after the December revelation, unidentified security sources said that a second informer acting independently of Donaldson disclosed the alleged spy ring. Former IRA prisoner and critic of Gerry Adams, Anthony McIntyre, claimed that a more important MI5 agent was operating in the organisation and that Donaldson was sacrificed by Sinn Féin to deceive people into thinking that the most serious infiltration had been ended.

Donaldson was not seen for months after he gave his revelations in December 2005, having left Belfast. In March 2006, Hugh Jordan, a journalist for the Sunday World located Donaldson in a remote cottage in Donegal and interviewed him. Donaldson denied the existence of any sort of spy ring, stating that he was part of an operation by the security services to support the Ulster Unionist leader David Trimble. "The plan was to collapse the institutions to save Trimble. David Trimble was trying to out-DUP the DUP and in the end the DUP swallowed him up. The whole idea was to get Trimble off the hook and get republicans the blame. But it didn't work because Trimble is history now." The paper included a picture of him in front of the secluded property, and he denied he was in hiding.

=== Assassination ===
The PSNI received information shortly after Donaldson's statements to the Sunday World were published, indicating his life could be at risk. A risk assessment of this threat was likely not undertaken by PSNI.

On 4 April 2006 he was found shot dead at a house he had been using as a retreat near Glenties, County Donegal. Irish Minister for Justice, Equality and Law Reform Michael McDowell said that Donaldson had been shot in the head and that his right forearm was almost severed. However, a post mortem revealed that he had died from a shotgun blast to the chest. His assassination was a major political incident. In 2009 the Real IRA claimed that they had been responsible for the killing. The investigation is still underway; Antoin Duffy was charged in March 2026 with the murder of Donaldson among other charges.

=== Restoration of devolved government ===
Northern Ireland was left under direct rule from Westminster with the collapse of Stormont in 2002. Ultimately the restoration of devolution was achieved through the St Andrews Agreement in 2006, which saw negotiations between the DUP and Sinn Féin- now the largest parties in the area. Several changes to the institutions were made including the introduction of a legally binding ministerial code. The Northern Ireland Act 2000 was also repealed, preventing any further occasions of direct rule from Westminster (without additional legislation). Devolution returned after the 2007 Northern Ireland Assembly election.

== See also ==
- Freddie Scappaticci
- List of scandals with "-gate" suffix
- Martin Ingram
- Operation Taurus
- Stakeknife
