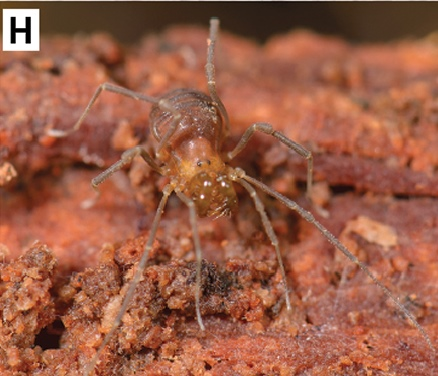
- Isolachus spinosus

Scientific classification
- Kingdom: Animalia
- Phylum: Arthropoda
- Subphylum: Chelicerata
- Class: Arachnida
- Order: Opiliones
- Family: Cladonychiidae
- Genus: Isolachus; Briggs, 1971
- Species: I. spinosus

Binomial name
- Isolachus spinosus Briggs, 1971

= Isolachus =

Genus of harvestmen/daddy longlegs

Isolachus is a genus of armoured harvestmen in the family Cladonychiidae. There is one described species in Isolachus, I. spinosus, found in Oregon and Washington.
