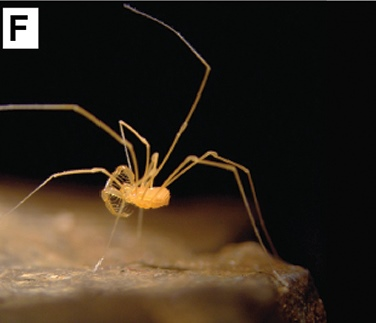
- Trojanella serbica

Scientific classification
- Kingdom: Animalia
- Phylum: Arthropoda
- Subphylum: Chelicerata
- Class: Arachnida
- Order: Opiliones
- Family: Travuniidae
- Genus: Trojanella; Karaman, 2005
- Species: T. serbica

Binomial name
- Trojanella serbica Karaman, 2005

= Trojanella =

Genus of harvestmen/daddy longlegs

Trojanella is a genus of harvestman in the family Travuniidae. There is one described species in Trojanella, T. serbica. It has been found only in a single cave on Stara Planina Mountain in Serbia.
