= Anne Vallaeys =

French writer and journalist (born 1951)

Anne Vallaeys (born in 1951) is a French journalist and writer of Belgian origin born in Yangambi, then part of Belgian Congo.

== Works ==
- 1983: Les Barcelonnettes, volume 1, Les Jardins de l'Alaméda, with Alain Dugrand, Paris, JC Lattès, 432 p. BnF 347165423 - reprint Fayard, 2003
- 1985: Les Barcelonnettes, volume 2, Terres Chaudes, with Alain Dugrand, JC Lattès, 361 p. BnF 347812895 - reprint. Fayard, 2003
- 1987: Les Barcelonnettes, volume 3, La Soldadera, with Alain Dugrand, JC Lattès, 308 p. BnF 349101270 - reprint Fayard, 2003
- 1989: Agua Verde, Paris, Payot, 264 p. ISBN 2-228-88178-3
- 1991: Coup de bambou, Payot, 225 p. ISBN 2-228-88298-4
- 1993: Sale temps pour les saisons , Paris, Éditions Hoëbeke, 293 p. ISBN 2-905292-57-1
- 1995: La Bonne Chère, with Paul Bocuse, Paris, Flammarion, 197 p. ISBN 2-08-067172-3
- 1997: La Mémoire du papillon, Flammarion, series "Gulliver", 213 p. ISBN 2-08-067278-9
- 1999: Rue de la République, with Alain Dugrand, Paris, Éditions Grasset, 343 p. ISBN 2-246-54471-8
- 2000: Fontainebleau, la forêt des passions, Paris, Stock, 325 p. ISBN 2-234-05221-1
- 2002: Les Filles. Chronique d'une année de première, Fayard, 224 p. ISBN 2-213-61162-9
- 2004: Médecins sans frontières. La Biographie, Fayard, 764 p. ISBN 2-213-61676-0 - prix Joseph-Kessel
- 2007: Indépendance Tcha-Tcha, Fayard, 290 p. ISBN 978-2-213-62449-5.
- 2008: Dieulefit ou Le Miracle du silence, Fayard, 247 p. ISBN 978-2-213-63406-7

2008: - Special mention of the prix littéraire de la Résistance

- 2010 Edward dans sa jungle, Paris, Fayard, 328 p. ISBN 978-2-213-64312-0
- 2013: Le loup est revenu, Fayard, 300 p. ISBN 978-2-213-66870-3
- Hautes solitudes. Sur les traces des transhumants, Éditions de la Table ronde, 2017, 256 p. ISBN 978-2-710-37731-3

== Documentary ==
- Patrick Benquet and Anne Vallaeys, L'Aventure MSF, 2006 - prize of the Festival international du film d'histoire de Pessac 2007
