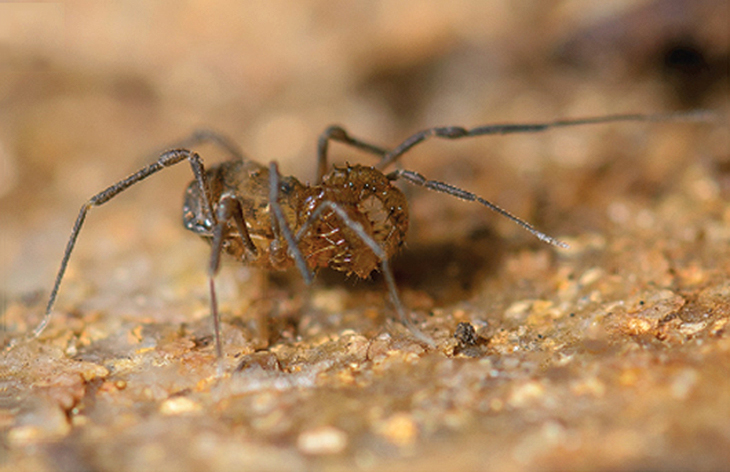
- Theromaster brunneus

Scientific classification
- Kingdom: Animalia
- Phylum: Arthropoda
- Subphylum: Chelicerata
- Class: Arachnida
- Order: Opiliones
- Family: Travuniidae
- Genus: Theromaster
- Species: T. brunneus

Binomial name
- Theromaster brunneus (Banks, 1902)

= Theromaster brunneus =

Species of harvestman/daddy longlegs

Theromaster brunneus is a species of armoured harvestman in the family Travuniidae. It is found in North America.
