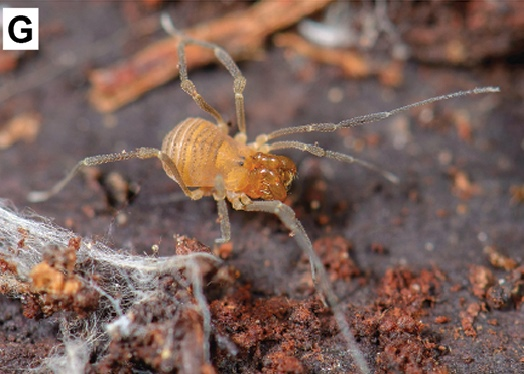
- Briggsus

Scientific classification
- Kingdom: Animalia
- Phylum: Arthropoda
- Subphylum: Chelicerata
- Class: Arachnida
- Order: Opiliones
- Family: Cladonychiidae
- Genus: Briggsus; Özdikmen & Demir, 2008

= Briggsus =

Genus of harvestmen/daddy longlegs

Briggsus is a genus of armoured harvestmen in the family Cladonychiidae. There are about five described species in Briggsus, found in the coastal forests of Oregon and Washington.

== Species ==
These five species belong to the genus Briggsus:

- Briggsus bilobatus (Briggs, 1971)
- Briggsus clavatus (Briggs, 1971)
- Briggsus flavescens (Briggs, 1971)
- Briggsus hamatus (Briggs, 1971)
- Briggsus pacificus (Briggs, 1971)
