= Lionel Duroy =

French writer and journalist

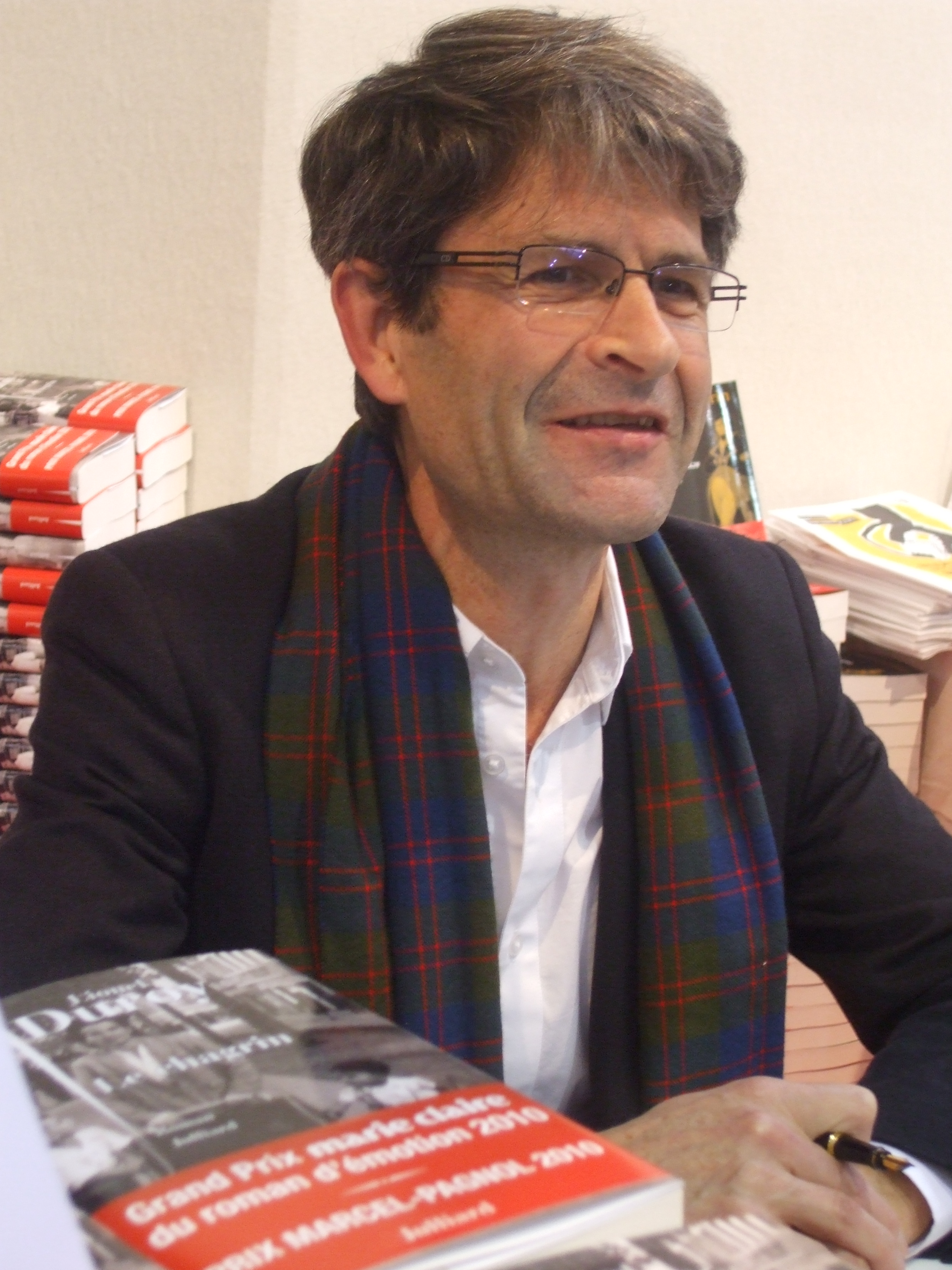
Lionel Duroy at the 2010 Foire du livre de Brive-la-Gaillarde.

Lionel Duroy de Suduiraut (born 1 October 1949) is a French writer and journalist born in Bizerte (Tunisia) into an impoverished family of aristocratic origin who long shared extreme right-wing ideas. His youth in this environment left a profound mark on him and was the breeding ground for many of his books. (Priez pour nous, Le Chagrin). Lionel Duroy was first a delivery man, a courier, a worker, then a journalist at Libération and at L'événement du jeudi. Since the publication of his first novel in 1990, he has devoted himself entirely to writing novels with essentially autobiographical content. He is happy to talk about his mother, the family trauma linked to his father's war wounds and the legal expulsion of his family from their home in 1955 - following a lack of solidarity from the rest of the family.

He is a ghost-writer for many celebrities who wish to publish their autobiographies.

In 2013, his novel L'Hiver des hommes made him the winner of the prix Renaudot des lycéens 2012 and the Prix Joseph-Kessel 2013.

== Works ==
- Hienghène, le désespoir calédonien. Paris: Barrault Éditions. 1988. p. 319. ISBN 9782736000875.
- L'Affaire de Poitiers. Paris: Barrault Éditions. 1988. p. 272. ISBN 978-2736000769.
- Priez pour nous. Paris: Barrault Éditions. 1990. p. 356. ISBN 9782736001230.
- Je voudrais descendre. Cadre rouge. Paris: Éditions du Seuil. 1993. p. 138. ISBN 9782020206358.
- Il ne m'est rien arrivé. Bleue. Paris: Mercure de France. 1994. p. 179. ISBN 9782715218772.
- Comme des héros. Libres. Paris: Fayard. 1996. p. 119. ISBN 9782213596037.
- Mon premier jour de bonheur. Paris: Éditions Julliard. 1996. p. 221. ISBN 9782260014348.
- Des hommes éblouissants. Paris: Éditions Julliard. 1997. p. 268. ISBN 9782260014577.
- Un jour je te tuerai. Paris: Julliard. 1999. p. 229. ISBN 978-2260015116.
- Trois couples en quête d'orages. Paris: Éditions Julliard. 2000. p. 224. ISBN 9782260015413.
- Méfiez-vous des écrivains. Paris: Éditions Julliard. 2002. p. 287. ISBN 978-2260015772.
- Le Cahier de Turin. Paris: Éditions Julliard. 2003. p. 232. ISBN 9782260016267.
- Écrire. Paris: Éditions Julliard. 2005. p. 136. ISBN 9782260016915.
- Le Chagrin. Paris: Éditions Julliard. 2010. p. 548. ISBN 9782260018094. – Prix François-Mauriac de la région Aquitaine 2010, Grand prix Marie Claire du roman d'émotion 2010, Prix Marcel Pagnol 2010
- Colères. Paris: Éditions Julliard. 2011. p. 212. ISBN 9782260019145.
- Survivre avec les loups. La véritable histoire de Misha Defonseca. Paris: XO Édition. 2011. p. 238. ISBN 978-2-84563-415-2.
- L'Hiver des hommes. Paris: Éditions Julliard. 2012. p. 355. ISBN 978-2-260-01916-9.

- Prix Renaudot des Lycéens 2012
- Prix Joseph-Kessel 2013

- Vertiges. Paris: Éditions Julliard. 2013. p. 480. ISBN 978-2-260-02114-8.
- Échapper, Paris, Julliard, 2015, 277 p. ISBN 978-2-260-02137-7
- L’Absente, Paris, Julliard, 2016, 360 p. ISBN 978-2-260-02922-9
- Eugenia, Paris, Julliard, 2018, 394 p. ISBN 978-2-260-03046-1

=== In collaboration ===
- Stéphane Moles (1980). Paroles de patrons. Paris: Éditions Alain Moreau. p. 93. ISBN 9788485848003.
- Thierry Huguenin (1995). Le 54e. Le Rescapé du massacre de la secte du temple solaire. Paris: Éditions Fixot. p. 251. ISBN 9782221080450.
- Destin Nord. Paris: Éditions Robert Laffont. 1998. p. 144. ISBN 9782221087411.
- Íngrid Betancourt (2001). La Rage au cœur. Paris: XO éditions. p. 250. ISBN 9782744147975. (Prix spécial du Jury Prix Vérité), 2007
- Farah Pahlavi (2003). Mémoires. Paris: XO Éditions. p. 432. ISBN 978-2845630659.
- Raioaoa Tavae (2004). Si loin du monde. Paris: Oh ! Éditions. pp. 173. ISBN 9782915056068.
- Sylvie Vartan (2004). Entre l'ombre et la lumière. Paris: XO Éditions. p. 400. ISBN 9782744173196.
- Mireille Darc (2005). Tant que battra mon cœur. Paris: XO Éditions. p. 349. ISBN 9782744188107.
- Tarita Teriipaia (2005). Marlon Brando, mon amour, ma déchirure. Paris: XO éditions. p. 301. ISBN 9782744180675.
- Dominique Wiel (2006). Que Dieu ait pitié de nous. Paris: XO Éditions. p. 253. ISBN 9782915056433.
- Nadia Volf (2006). J'ai choisi la liberté. Paris: XO Éditions. p. 301. ISBN 9782845633100.
- Jean-Marie Bigard (2007). Rire pour ne pas mourir. Paris: Oh ! Éditions. p. 244. ISBN 9782915056419.
- Nana Mouskouri (2007). La Fille de la chauve-souris : mémoires. Paris: XO Éditions. ISBN 9782845633117.
- Sylvie Mathurin (2008). Un amour absolu. Paris: Oh ! Éditions. p. 272. ISBN 9782915056709.
- Gérard Depardieu (2014). Ça s'est fait comme ça. Paris: XO Éditions. p. 176. ISBN 9782845637320.
