= The World seen from the train =

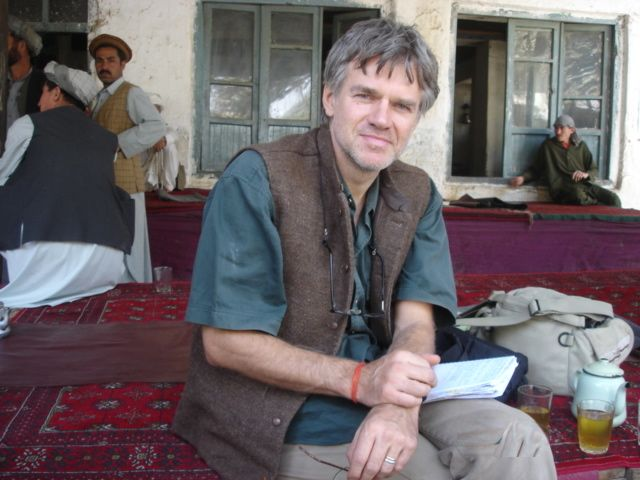
- Genre: Documentary
- Written by: Olivier Weber
- Directed by: Olivier Weber
- Presented by: Olivier Weber
- Country of origin: France
- Original languages: French, English

Production
- Running time: 52 minutes

Original release
- Network: Voyage National Geographic Fox International Channels France
- Release: March 2011 – present

The World seen from the train (Le monde vu du train) is a French adventure travel television series presented and directed by Olivier Weber, an award-winning writer, novelist and reporter, known primarily for his coverage of the wars in Iraq and Afghanistan. The documentaries were inspired by the author's books and reports around the world.

== Concept ==
Olivier Weber takes his camera on a tour of railway carriages and compartments throughout the world.

In several European Asian and Far East countries, the films take a new approach to the railway travel writing and filming genre by attempting to get to know people. Slices of life, scenery and stopovers are the main ingredients of the programmes.

== Episodes ==
- North India
- South India
- Turkey
- Switzerland
- South Africa 01
- South Africa 02
- North Thailand
- SouthThailand
- Scotland
- Spain
- Morocco
- Portugal
- Alps
- Pyrenees
- Ireland
- Austria
- Madagascar
- Norway
- Croatia
- Quebec
- Tunisia
- Sicily
- Czech Republic
- Mauritania
- United States
- Mexico
