= The Opium of Talibans =

2001 film by Olivier Weber and François Margolin

- Directed by: Olivier Weber and François Margolin
- Written by: Olivier Weber
- Produced by: Odyssée, Margo Films, Sylicone
- Cinematography: François Margolin and Olivier Weber
- Edited by: Emmanuelle Castro
- Distributed by: Margo Films
- Release date: October 2001
- Running time: 92 minutes
- Languages: English; French; Pashto; Persian

The Opium of Talibans (French: L'opium des talibans) is a 2001 French documentary film and road movie written and directed by Olivier Weber and François Margolin, dealing with the effects of the talibans rule in Afghanistan. It premiered at the 2001 FIPA Festival, and received the Special Prize at the 14th edition of the Festival.

== Overview ==
Through interviews with locals, militants, taliban commanders, the film discusses the effects of the introduction of the fundamentalism in Afghanistan. The film also dwells at length, and sometimes with humor, on hypocrisy of this regime, dealing with drugs, opium and heroin. As Mollah Akhunzada, member of the taliban government, says in the film: the talibans send drugs and poisons to other peoples of the planet and non-Muslims. The film shows also the threat on the Buddhas of Bamiyan, threatened by talibans and Al Qaida militants and then destroyed.

== Awards ==
- 2001 The International Festival of Audiovisual Programmes (Festival International de Programmes Audiovisuels in French) FIPA Special Film Award
- 2001 Award Premis Actual 2001 of the Catalan Broadcasting Corporation (CCRTV, Spain)
