= Travunia (harvestman) =

Scientific classification
- Kingdom: Animalia
- Phylum: Arthropoda
- Subphylum: Chelicerata
- Class: Arachnida
- Order: Opiliones
- Family: Travuniidae
- Genus: Travunia; Absolon, 1920

Genus of harvestmen/daddy longlegs

Travunia is a genus of harvestman in the family Travuniidae. There are four described species in Travunia. They are found in caves in the southern Dinaric Karst region of Balkan Europe.

== Species ==
These four species belong to the genus Travunia:

- Travunia borisi (Hadži, 1973)
- Travunia hofferi (Šilhavý, 1937)
- Travunia jandai (Kratochvíl, 1937)
- Travunia troglodytes (Roewer, 1915) (including Travunia anophthalma (Absolon 1916) [miscited elsewhere as authored by "(Absolon & Kratochvil, 1927)"].
