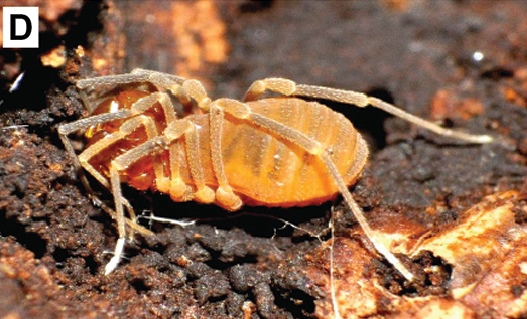
- Holoscotolemon lessiniense

Scientific classification
- Kingdom: Animalia
- Phylum: Arthropoda
- Subphylum: Chelicerata
- Class: Arachnida
- Order: Opiliones
- Family: Cladonychiidae
- Genus: Holoscotolemon; Roewer, 1915

= Holoscotolemon =

Genus of armoured harvestmen in the family Cladonychiidae

Holoscotolemon is a genus of armoured harvestmen in the family Cladonychiidae. There are about eight described species in Holoscotolemon, found in Europe.

== Species ==
These eight species belong to the genus Holoscotolemon:

- Holoscotolemon franzinii Tedeschi & Sciaky, 1994
- Holoscotolemon jaqueti (Corti, 1905)
- Holoscotolemon lessiniensis Martens, 1978
- Holoscotolemon monzinii Tedeschi & Sciaky, 1994
- Holoscotolemon naturae Tedeschi & Sciaky, 1994
- Holoscotolemon oreophilus Martens, 1978
- Holoscotolemon querilhaci (Lucas, 1864)
- Holoscotolemon unicolor Roewer, 1915
