= Proholoscotolemon =

Scientific classification
- Kingdom: Animalia
- Phylum: Arthropoda
- Subphylum: Chelicerata
- Class: Arachnida
- Order: Opiliones
- Family: Cladonychiidae
- Genus: †Proholoscotolemon; Ubick & Dunlop, 2005
- Species: †P. nemastomoides

Binomial name
- †Proholoscotolemon nemastomoides (Koch & Berendt, 1854)

Genus of harvestmen/daddy longlegs

Proholoscotolemon is an extinct genus of armoured harvestmen in the family Cladonychiidae. There is one species in Proholoscotolemon, P. nemastomoides. It is known from specimens preserved in Baltic amber.
