= SS Asia (1907) =

Cargo liner that caught fire in 1930

History
- Name: 1907: Alice; 1917: Asia
- Owner: 1907: Unione Austriaca; 1917: Lloyd Nacional; 1920: Cie Française de Nav à Vap
- Operator: 1917: Giuseppe Martinelli; 1920: Fabre Line
- Port of registry: 1907: (Austria-Hungary) Trieste; 1917: (Brazil) Rio de Janeiro; 1920: (France) Marseille
- Route: 1907: Trieste – New York; 1913: Trieste – Rio de Janeiro
- Builder: Russell & Co, Port Glasgow
- Launched: 29 May 1907
- Maiden voyage: 28 August 1907, to New York
- Identification: 1907: code letters HBLC; by 1914: call sign OKI; by 1921: code letters OCMD
- Fate: burnt out, 21 May 1930

General characteristics
- Type: cargo liner
- Tonnage: 6,122 GRT, 3,190 NRT
- Length: 415.3 ft (126.6 m)
- Beam: 49.6 ft (15.1 m)
- Draught: 26 ft 1 in (7.95 m)
- Depth: 25.1 ft (7.7 m)
- Decks: 2
- Installed power: 2 × triple-expansion engines, 757 NHP
- Propulsion: 2 × screws
- Speed: 16 knots (30 km/h)
- Capacity: passengers, 1907: 50 × 1st class; 75 × 2nd class; 1,500 × 3rd class
- Notes: sister ship: Laura

SS Asia was a steam cargo liner. She was built in Scotland in 1907 as Alice for the Austro-Hungarian shipping line Unione Austriaca, to take emigrants from Trieste to New York. From 1913 she worked a route between Trieste and Rio de Janeiro. Brazil interned her in 1914, and seized her in 1917. She was renamed Asia, and transferred to Lloyd Nacional. In 1920 she was awarded to France as part of war reparations, and transferred to Fabre Line, who at first ran her between Marseille and South America. In 1930, she was chartered to take Muslim pilgrims to Jeddah for the Hajj. She caught fire in Jeddah when full of pilgrims. More than 100 pilgrims were killed, the ship was destroyed. However, all of her crew survived, and the French government rewarded some of them for their actions in the rescue of survivors. The tragedy prompted controversy in France as to the conditions in which shipping companies carried Muslim pilgrims.

== Laura and Alice ==
In 1907, Russell & Co in Port Glasgow built a pair of sister ships for Unione Austriaca. Yard number 580 was launched on 15 February 1907 as Laura, and completed that May. Yard number 581 was launched on 29 May 1907 as Alice, and completed that August.

Alice's registered length was 415.3 ft (126.6 m), her beam was 49.6 ft (15.1 m), her depth was 25.1 ft (7.7 m), and her draught was 26 ft 1 in (7.95 m). Her tonnages were 6,122 GRT and 3,190 NRT. Her passenger capacity is likely to have been the same as that of her sister ship Laura, which was 50 berths in first class, 75 in second class, and 1,500 in third class. She had twin screws, driven by a pair of three-cylinder triple-expansion engines that were built by John G. Kincaid & Company of Greenock. The combined power of her twin engines was rated at 757 NHP, and gave her a speed of 16 knots (30 km/h). Unione Austriaca registered her at Trieste. Her code letters were HBLC. By 1910 she was equipped with wireless telegraphy. By 1914 her call sign was OKI, and her wireless was operated and controlled by the Austro-Hungarian Imperial Inspectorate of the radiotelegraph service, based in Trieste.

On 28 August 1907, Alice began her maiden voyage, which was to New York. Most of her passenger capacity was third class, in which she took emigrants from Austria-Hungary and northern Italy to the US. She sailed between New York and Trieste until 9 October 1913, when Unione Austriaca transferred her to its routes to South America. In 1913, her outward voyages from Trieste to New York were typically via Patras, Palermo, and Algiers. Her return voyages were via Algiers, Naples, and Patras; and sometimes included a call at Venice. From May 1914, her sister ship Laura joined her on the routes to South America.

== Europa and Asia ==
When the First World War began, on 3 August 1914, Germany and Austria-Hungary ordered their merchant ships to return home if possible, or otherwise take shelter in a neutral port. Alice took refuge in Brazil, where she was interned. Laura also took shelter in Brazil, in Salvador.

Brazil was neutral until 1917, when Germany resumed unrestricted submarine warfare. German U-boats then sank a number of Brazilian merchant ships, which led Brazil to suspend diplomatic relations with Germany on 11 April 1917, and seize all German ships in its ports on 2 June. On 26 October 1917, Brazil declared war against Germany, but not against the other Central Powers.

Also during 1917, an Italian-Brazilian businessman, Giuseppe Martinelli, founded the shipping company Lloyd Nacional. He bought Laura, and renamed her Europa. He also acquired Alice, renamed her Asia, and registered her in Rio de Janeiro.

In 1919, the Entente Powers awarded both Asia and Europa to France, as part of war reparations. The French government transferred both ships to the Compagnie Française de Navigation à Vapeur, which traded as Fabre Line. Laura was renamed Braga, and both ships were registered in Marseille. By 1921, Asia's code letters were OCMD.

Europa's passenger accommodation was refitted: reduced from three classes to two, with 130 berths in "cabin class", and 1,350 in 3rd class. Asia may have been refitted similarly. Fabre Line at first ran Asia on its route between France and South America. Europa was wrecked in the Aegean Sea in 1926.

== Loss of Asia ==
In April 1930, four businessmen in Algiers chartered Asia to take 700 pilgrims from Algeria pilgrims to Jeddah, apparently to reach Mecca in time for Eid al-Adha, which that year was on 9 May. Having disembarked her pilgrims in Jeddah, Asia then embarked 1,500 other pilgrims who were returning home: 300 to French Somaliland, and the remainder to Aden. On 21 May, while Asia was still anchored in the roadstead of Jeddah, fire broke out aboard her, and panic broke out among the pilgrims as the fire spread. Several ships came to her aid, including Société Anonyme Coopérative de Navigation's Belgrano, the Khedivial Mail S.S. Company's Al Taïef and Boulac, and Strick Line's Arabistan. All of Asia's French crew survived, but more than 100 of her Muslim passengers were killed, either in the fire, or drowned in the sea. On 30 May, Asia's burnt-out hulk was towed out of the roadstead, and beached northwest of a place called Bahri Reef, to avoid the risk of her sinking where her wreck could obstruct the roadstead. In a ministerial decision dated 20 January 1931, the French government rewarded some of Asia's crew, and many of Belgrano's officers and men, for their part in the rescue of survivors.

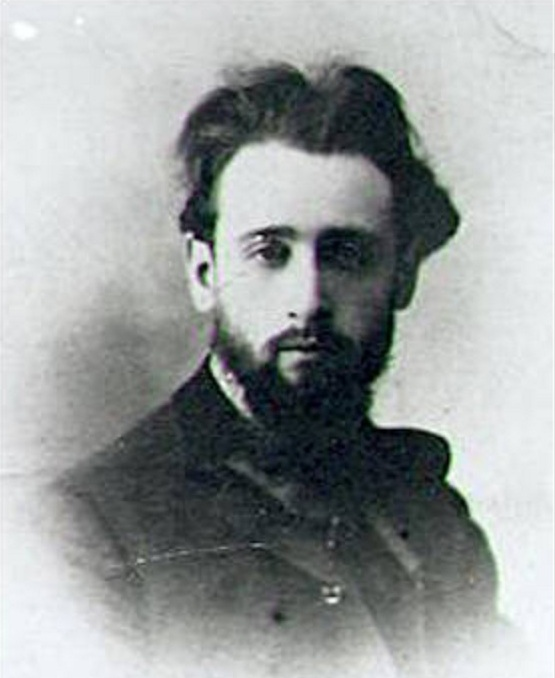
Albert Londres in 1923

Albert Londres, an investigative reporter for Le Petit Parisien, was in Jeddah when Asia caught fire. He hired a dhow to take him out to observe the disaster, and he wrote a report about what he saw. The official death toll was about 115. However, on 17 June, the Socialist deputy Émile Goude alleged in the French National Assembly that the true number was 200. And in August 1930, an article in Le Cri du Marin ("The Sailor's Cry"), a periodical published by the French CGT trades union, accused Fabre Line of insuring Asia for more than she was worth, and alleged that the real death toll was 500. In April 1931, Le Cri du Marin published an article about the disaster entitled Une nuit d’épouvante ("A Night of Terror"), which accused Fabre Line of overloading the ship, and providing too few lifeboats and lifejackets. On 21 August 1931, the Communist daily L'Humanité republished the article. A modern source claims that the death toll was 162.

== Bibliography ==
- Haws, Duncan (2001). Italia 1881–2001. Merchant Fleets. Vol. 40. Pembroke. ISBN 0-946378-43-6.
- Lloyd's Register of British and Foreign Shipping. Vol. I.–Steamers. London: Lloyd's Register of Shipping. 1907 – via Internet Archive.
- Lloyd's Register of British and Foreign Shipping. Vol. I.–Steamers. London: Lloyd's Register of Shipping. 1910 – via Internet Archive.
- Lloyd's Register of Shipping. Vol. II.–Steamers. London: Lloyd's Register of Shipping. 1917 – via Internet Archive.
- Lloyd's Register of Shipping. Vol. II.–Steamers. London: Lloyd's Register of Shipping. 1919 – via Internet Archive.
- Lloyd's Register of Shipping. Vol. II.–Steamers. London: Lloyd's Register of Shipping. 1921 – via Internet Archive.
- The Marconi Press Agency Ltd (1914). The Year Book of Wireless Telegraphy and Telephony. London: The Marconi Press Agency Ltd.
- Ryan, Andrew (21 June 1930). Jedda Report of the Period May 1 to 31, 1930. London: His Majesty's Stationery Office – via Qatar National Library.
