= Cursed for Gold =

2008 French documentary film

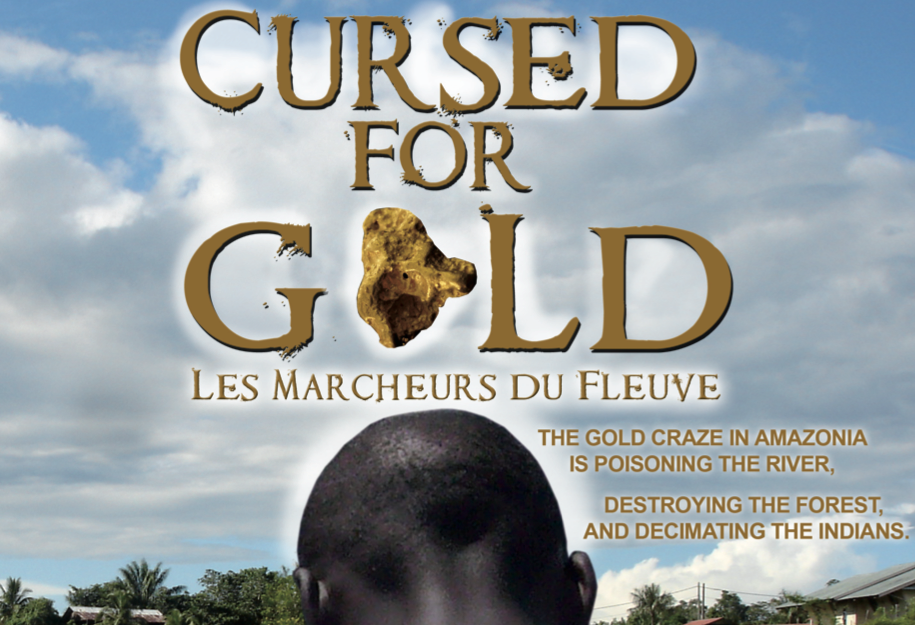
- Directed by: Olivier Weber
- Written by: Olivier Weber
- Produced by: Rosem Films; France Televisions; Canal Plus; France Televisions Distribution
- Cinematography: Olivier Weber
- Edited by: Florence Bresson
- Music by: Christophe Monthieux
- Distributed by: Zootrope Films
- Release date: 15 October 2008
- Running time: 93 minutes
- Languages: English, French

Cursed for Gold (French: La Fièvre de l'Or) is a 2008 French documentary film written and directed by the French writer and novelist Olivier Weber, former war correspondent, dealing with the new gold rush destroying the Amazon rainforest.

== Overview ==
A new gold rush is sweeping through the Amazon rainforest where scores of women and men hunt for nuggets and specks of gold. But this race for gold is bringing on the destruction of one of the last earthly paradises, the world's largest tropical forest, the lungs of our planet, where everything and anything can be paid in gold. As a result, a gold ingot cycle has developed—with its batch of insolvents, prostitutes, godfathers, traffickers, whether in French Guiana, Brazil or Suriname. Gold has brought upon disease, mercury, crime, alcoholism. Gold has turned creeks and rivers into dumping grounds. This cycle is that of the destruction of men by men. Whereas the Amazonian rainforest releases 300 tons of gold each year, it receives 120 tons of mercury. An uneven trade: treasure against poison. And as the backdrop, all sorts of traffics are arising: people, weapons, drugs. In the depths of this borderless jungle also lies the tragedy of the Wayanas, a Native American tribe from Guiana, who are being poisoned by mercury, the element essential to gold mining. The Wayanas are doomed by a looming disappearance. Congenital malformations have already been observed in children. The elderly are developing neurological disorders and cancers. Along with the outrage that is mercury comes another massacre of Indians. The New Eldorado is enduring one of the world's worst globalization disasters.

The film premiered at the 2008 Cannes Film Festival for a special screening and received the 2008 Trophy of Adventure. Top 10 of the best films on ecology with Darwin's Nightmare and Unbelievable Truth.

== Awards and festivals ==
- Trophy of Adventure, 2008
- Prize Terra Festival, 2010
- International Festival of Francophone Film, 2009
- Festival Grand bivouac, 2010
- Festival Amazing Travellers (Étonnants Voyageurs), 2011
- Top 10 of films on ecology.

== See also ==
- Political Cinema
