= Dinaria vjetrenicae =

Scientific classification
- Kingdom: Animalia
- Phylum: Arthropoda
- Subphylum: Chelicerata
- Class: Arachnida
- Order: Opiliones
- Family: Travuniidae
- Genus: Dinaria; Roewer, 1915
- Species: D. vjetrenicae

Binomial name
- Dinaria vjetrenicae (Hadži, 1932)

Synonyms
- Species synonymy: Travunia (Dinaria) vjetrenicae Hadži, 1932

Genus of harvestmen

Dinaria is a genus of harvestman in the family Travuniidae. There is one described species, Dinaria vjetrenicae. It has been found only in Vjetrenica Cave in southern Bosnia and Herzegovina.
