= Dinara, Kutch =

Village in Gujarat, India

Coordinates: 23.894863°N 69.737692°E

Dinara is a village near Bhuj of Kutch district of Gujarat, India.

== Places of interest ==
About half a mile to the south of village, the ruins of a white-limestone Jain temple, fifty feet long by eighteen wide, said to be the place where Sadevant and Savalinga, the hero and heroine of a Gujarati romance, used to study.
