= Speleonychia =

Scientific classification
- Kingdom: Animalia
- Phylum: Arthropoda
- Subphylum: Chelicerata
- Class: Arachnida
- Order: Opiliones
- Family: Cladonychiidae
- Genus: Speleonychia; Briggs, 1974

Genus of harvestmen/daddy longlegs

Speleonychia is a genus of armoured harvestmen in the family Cladonychiidae. There is at least one described species in Speleonychia, S. sengeri. It is found in Washington state.
