= Paul Balta =

French journalist and writer (1929–2019)

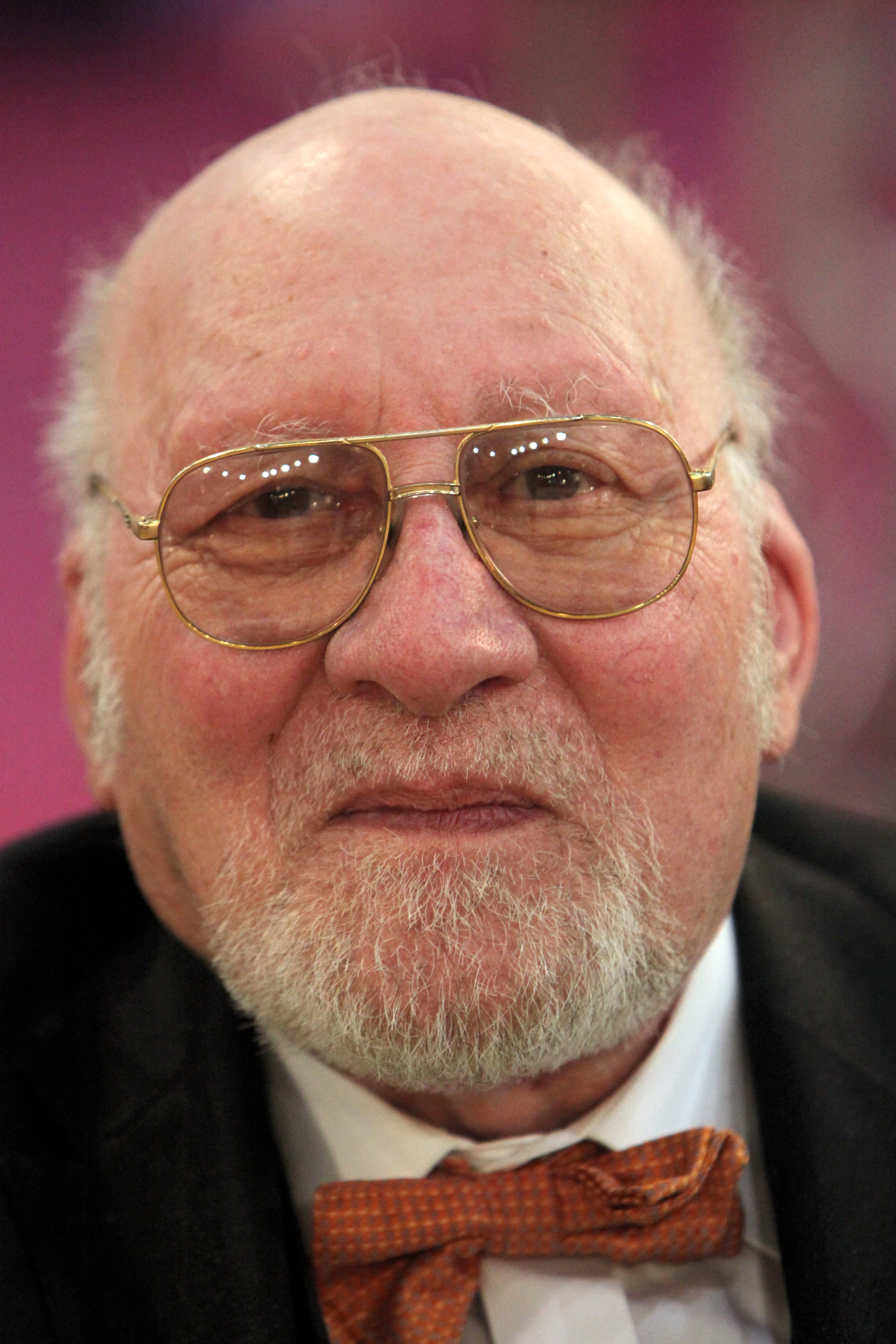
- Paul Balta in 2011.
- Born: 24 March 1929; Alexandria, Egypt
- Died: 27 January 2019 (aged 89); Paris, France
- Occupations: Journalist; Writer

Paul Balta (24 March 1929 – 27 January 2019) was a French journalist and writer.

== Biography ==
After attending Lycée Louis-le-Grand, Balta decided to become a journalist. From 1970 to 1985, Balta specialized in the Middle East and Maghreb for Le Monde.Then, from 1987 to 1994, he directed the Center for Contemporary Oriental Studies at the New Sorbonne University Paris 3.

Balta died on 27 January 2019.
