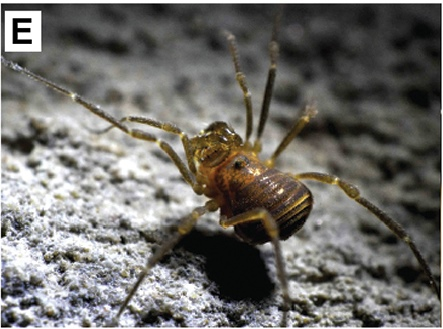
- Peltonychia leprieurii

Scientific classification
- Kingdom: Animalia
- Phylum: Arthropoda
- Subphylum: Chelicerata
- Class: Arachnida
- Order: Opiliones
- Family: Cladonychiidae
- Genus: Peltonychia; Roewer, 1935

= Peltonychia =

Genus of harvestmen/daddy longlegs

Peltonychia is a genus of armoured harvestmen in the family Cladonychiidae. There are about nine described species in Peltonychia that are found in Europe.

== Species ==
These nine species belong to the genus Peltonychia:

- Peltonychia clavigera (Simon, 1879)
- Peltonychia gabria Roewer, 1935
- Peltonychia leprieuri (Lucas, 1861)
- Peltonychia leprieurii
- Peltonychia navarica (Simon, 1879)
- Peltonychia piochardi (Simon, 1872)
- Peltonychia postumicola (Roewer, 1935)
- Peltonychia sarea (Roewer, 1935)
- Peltonychia tenuis Roewer, 1935
