= Buemarinoa =

Scientific classification
- Kingdom: Animalia
- Phylum: Arthropoda
- Subphylum: Chelicerata
- Class: Arachnida
- Order: Opiliones
- Family: Cladonychiidae
- Genus: Buemarinoa; Roewer, 1956
- Species: B. patrizii

Binomial name
- Buemarinoa patrizii Roewer, 1956

Genus of harvestmen/daddy longlegs

Buemarinoa is a genus of armoured harvestmen in the family Cladonychiidae. There is one described species in Buemarinoa, B. patrizii, found in Sardinia, Italy.
