= Dinara Drukarova =

Russian actress (born 1976)

- Динара Друкарова
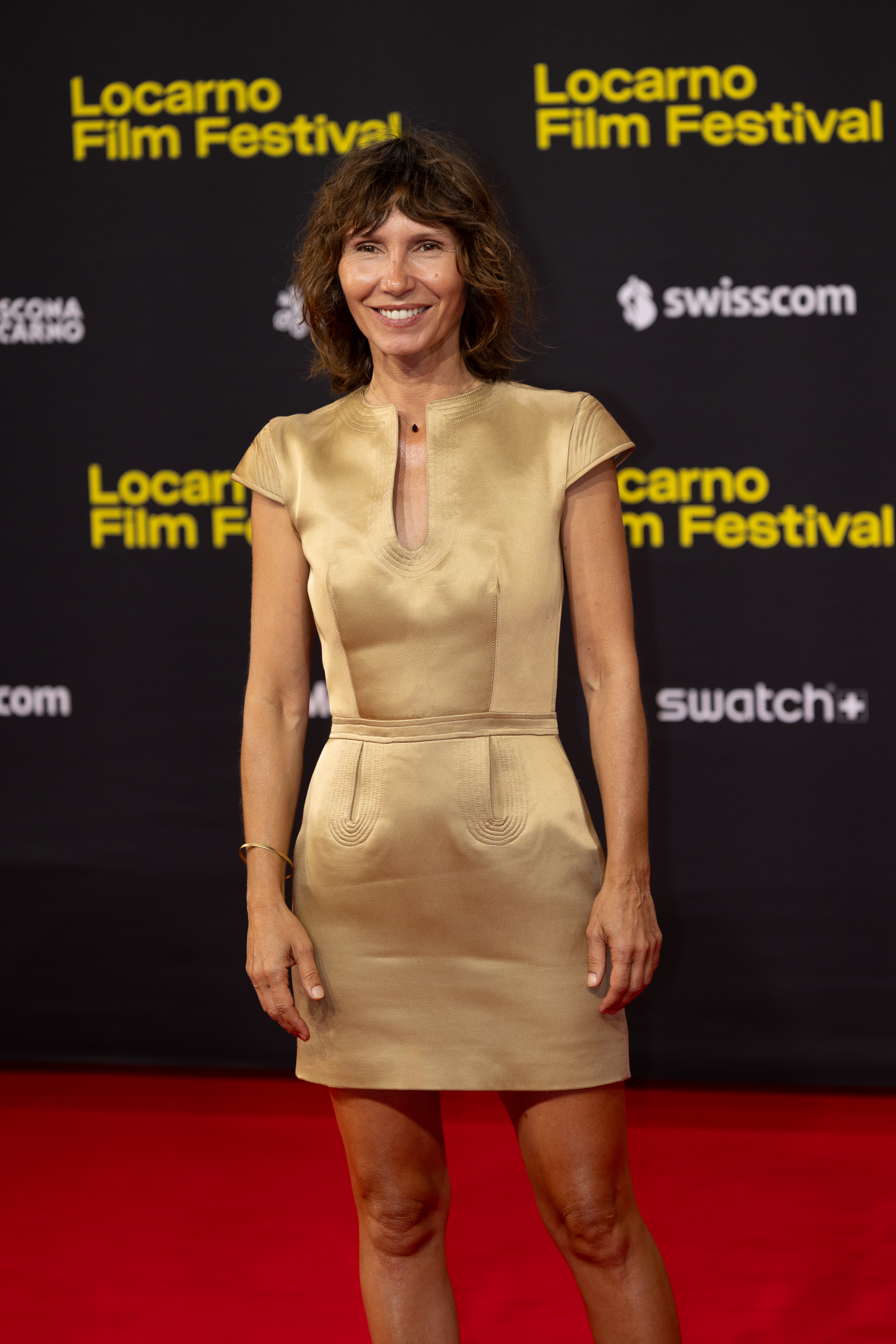
- Drukarova in 2026
- Born: Dinara Anatolyevna Drukarova; 3 January 1976 (age 50); Leningrad, RSFSR, USSR
- Citizenship: Soviet Union →: Russia; France
- Occupations: Actress; film director
- Years active: 1989–present

Dinara Anatolyevna Drukarova (Russian: Дина́ра Анато́льевна Друка́рова; born 3 January 1976) is a Soviet and Russian actress and film director.

== Life and career ==
Drukarova was born in Leningrad, Russian SFSR, Soviet Union (now Saint Petersburg, Russia), and still lives there half the year, spending the other half in France, where she tends to pursue most of her film roles. She made her debut in the 1989 film, It Was Near Sea, but it was her second film, Don't Move, Die and Rise Again!, which first saw her receiving attention, when the film won the Golden Camera at the 1990 Cannes Film Festival.

She starred in a number of minor Russian films in the early 1990s, but began to pursue European (and predominantly French) productions after making her first film there, The Son of Gascogne (1996). She made a brief foray into music soon after, recording a not widely released single, "Made in Leningrad". However, she has remained focused on acting, and not recorded anything since.

One of Drukarova's few Russian films during the latter half of the 1990s was the controversial 1998 cult film Of Freaks and Men, in which she played the female lead role of Lisa. This performance saw her nominated in the category of "Best European Actress" at the 1998 European Film Awards. She was subsequently interviewed in a number of prominent French magazines, including Elle, Premiere, and Vogue. In addition, Drukarova was appointed as a member of one of the juries at the 1998 Strasbourg European Film Festival.

Over the next few years, Drukarova featured in several more minor films before winning the key part of Ada, a Georgian woman, in the 2003 film Since Otar Left. The film received a wide arthouse release in several countries, winning the Critics Week Grand Prize at Cannes, and substantially increased her profile internationally. In 2004, she was featured in the music videos 'Club foot' and 'L.S.F.' by British band, Kasabian.

== Selected filmography ==
- Freeze Die Come to Life (1989)
- Le Fils de Gascogne (1996)
- Of Freaks and Men (1998)
- Since Otar Left (2002)
- Silent Voice (2009)
- 360 (2012)
- Amour (2012)
- My Golden Days (2015)
- Compartment No. 6 (2021)
- Woman at Sea (2022) (also director)
