= Yahia Belaskri =

French-algerian journalist and novelist

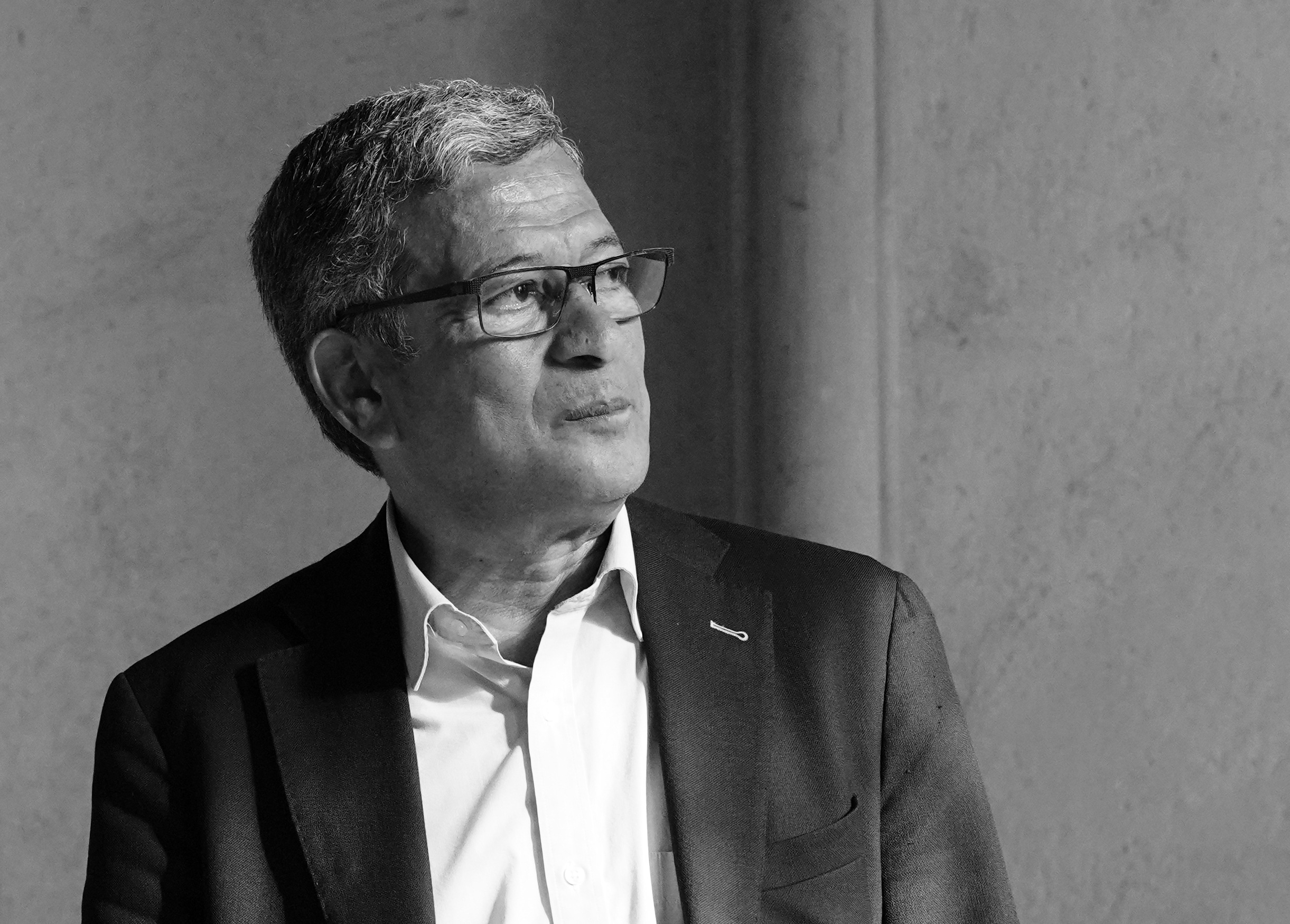
- Yahia Belaskri in 2022
- Born: 1952 (age 73–74); Oran, French Algeria
- Occupations: Journalist, novelist, short story writer

Yahia Belaskri (born 1952) is an Algerian journalist, novelist and short story writer. He is the author of four novels and the recipient of two literary prizes.

== Early life ==
Yahia Belaskri was born in 1952.

== Career ==
Belaskri began working as a journalist for Radio France Internationale in 2004.

Belaskri is the author of four novels. His second novel, Si tu cherches la pluie, elle vient d’en haut, is about the Algerian Civil War of the 1990s. His third novel, Une longue nuit d’absence, is about pro-republican Spaniards who emigrated to Algeria in 1939. His fourth novel, Les fils du jour, is based on the immediate aftermath of the French conquest of Algeria of 1830–1847.

== Awards ==
Belasski won the prix Ouest-France - Etonnants voyageurs at the 2011 Étonnants voyageurs book festival in Saint-Malo for Si tu cherches la pluie, elle vient d’en haut. In 2015, he won the Prix littéraire Beur FM Méditerranée from Beur FM for Les fils du jour.

== Works ==
=== Novels ===
- Belaskri, Yahia (2008). Le bus dans la ville. La Roque-d'Anthéron: Vents d'ailleurs. ISBN 9782911412530. OCLC 227152773.
- Belaskri, Yahia (2010). Si tu cherches la pluie, elle vient d'en haut. La Roque-d'Anthéron: Vents d'ailleurs. ISBN 9782911412745. OCLC 680229684.
- Balaskri, Yahia (2012). Une longue nuit d'absence. La Roque-d'Anthéron: Vents d'ailleurs. ISBN 9782364130098. OCLC 785074283.
- Belaskri, Yahia (2014). Les fils du jour. La Roque-d'Anthéron: Vents d'ailleurs. ISBN 9782364130463. OCLC 896815983.

=== Short stories ===
- Belaskri, Yahia (2003). "Histoire fausse". In Traoré, Sayouba (ed.). Dernières nouvelles de la Françafrique. La Roque d'Anthéron: Vents d'ailleurs. ISBN 9782911412257. OCLC 54685065.
- —— (2009). "Le retour". In Ammi, Kebir; Boudjedra, Rachid (eds.). Ancrage africain. Algiers: APIC. ISBN 9789961769607. OCLC 498936951.
- —— (2010). "Blanc et noir". In Defert, Dominique; Waberi, Abdourahman (eds.). Enfants de la balle : nouvelles d'Afrique, nouvelles de foot. Paris: JC Lattès. ISBN 9782709635325. OCLC 631652139.
- —— (2012). "Un homme est mort, un seul le pleure". In Belaskri, Yahia; Lesne, Elisabeth (eds.). Algéries 50. Paris: Magellan. ISBN 9782350742236. OCLC 780367610.
- —— (2015). "Ma mère". Algérie : la nahda des lettres, la renaissance des mots. Paris: Riveneuve éditions. ISBN 9782360131860. OCLC 922879261.
- —— (2015). "Le destin des hommes". Le peuple des lumières : recueil de nouvelles pour comprendre nos sociétés. Hévillers: Ker Editions. ISBN 9782875861191. OCLC 950459808.
- —— (2016). "L'enfant de M'dina J'dida". In Sebbar, Leïla (ed.). Une enfance dans la guerre : Algérie 1954-1962. Saint-Pourçain-sur-Sioule: Bleu autour. ISBN 9782358480734. OCLC 945349175.

=== Non-fiction ===
- Belaskri, Yahia (1995). Khaled. Paris: Sogecom-Edition. ISBN 9782950965103. OCLC 55727098.
- Belaskri, Yahia (1998). "L'islamisme et l'Europe sociale". In Camus, Jean-Yves (ed.). Les extrémismes en Europe : état des lieux en 1998. La Tour d'Aigues: Editions de l'Aube. ISBN 9782930088952. OCLC 40165948.
- Belaskri, Yahia; Chaulet-Achour, Christiane, eds. (2004). L'épreuve d'une décennie : Algérie, arts et culture, 1992-2002. Paris: Paris-Méditerranée. ISBN 9782842721954. OCLC 54987876.
- Belaskri, Yahia, ed. (2007). Les Franco-Maghrébins et la République. Saint-Denis: APCV. ISBN 9782952708609. OCLC 315137354.
- Belaskri, Yahia (2013). "Camus et l'Algérie : le retour". In Castillo, Eduardo (ed.). Pourquoi Camus?. Paris: Editions Philippe Rey. ISBN 9782848762920. OCLC 844783819.
- Belaskri, Yahia (2015). Haïti, en lettres et en images. Delmas: C3 Éditions. ISBN 9789997054586. OCLC 919266650.
