= Dinara Sadretdinova =

Russian actress and TV presenter (born 1976)

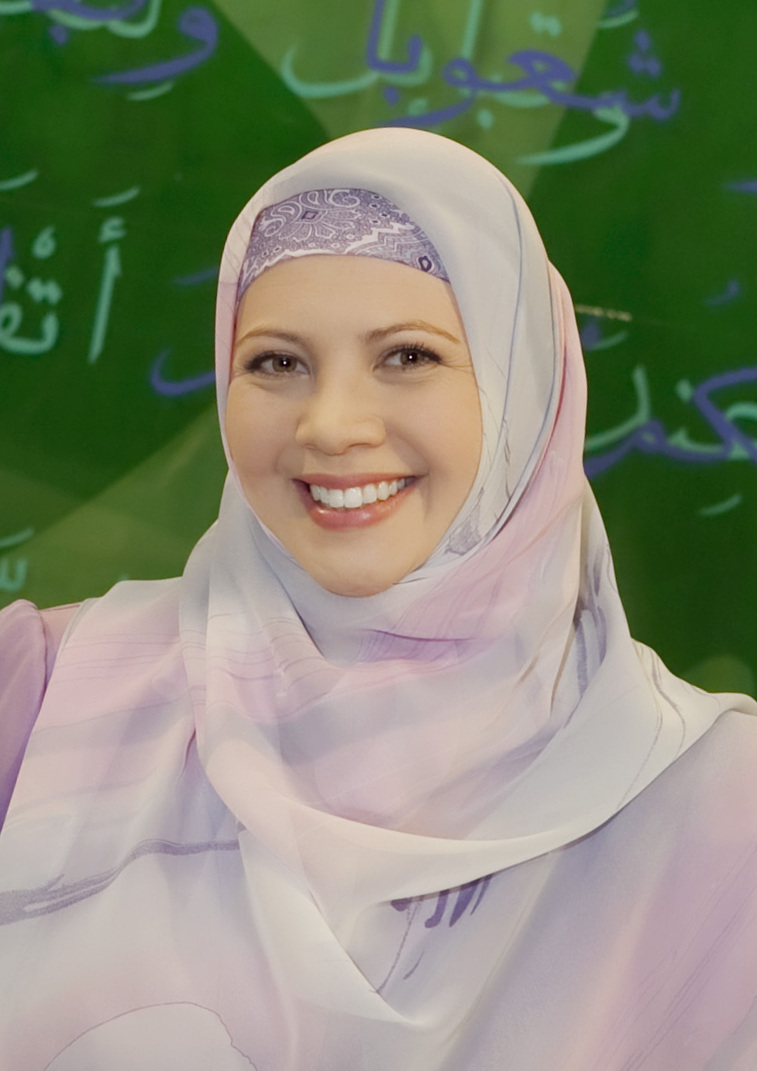
- Sadretdinova in 2010
- Born: June 4, 1976 (age 50); Moscow, Russian SFSR, USSR
- Occupations: Actress and TV presenter
- Years active: 1999–present
- Children: Yasmin Sekakmia; May 31, 2003 (age 23)

Dinara Rafikovna Sadretdinova (Russian: Садретдинова, Динара Рафиковна, b June 4, 1976) is a Russian TV presenter. She was born in Moscow.

== Education ==
Sadretdinova studied at The Russian Academy of Theatre Arts, the Moscow Institute of Open Education and the Training Institute of Television and Radio.

== Career ==
Sadretdinova was presenter of the television program Islam on the satellite channel "AST " from 1999 to 2001. She became the TV presenter of the television program "Muslims" on the Information and entertainment channels. In March 2008, Sadretdinova was the guest of honor at the Al Jazeera International Documentary Film Festival in Qatar. She has been the guest of honor and presenter of the "Kazan International Festival of Muslim Cinema" two times. Sadretdinova has also been a part of the International Media Forum "Interaction in the common interest" in the Republic of Adygea. In October 2010, she was a part of the All Russian female Islamic Conference "Women will save the world" in the Chechen Republic.

That year, she was listed among the "best 10 female journalists in the Islamic world" and was invited to the International Conference of Women Journalists, held in Iran, where she was awarded the international prize "The Word Zainab".
