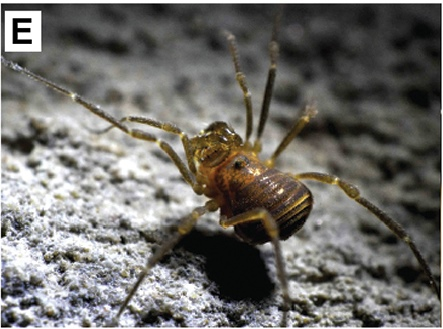
- Peltonychia leprieurii

Scientific classification
- Domain: Eukaryota
- Kingdom: Animalia
- Phylum: Arthropoda
- Subphylum: Chelicerata
- Class: Arachnida
- Order: Opiliones
- Superfamily: Travunioidea
- Family: Travuniidae; Absolon & Kratochvíl, 1932

Species
- See text

Diversity
- 9 genera, > 10 species

= Travuniidae =

Family of harvestmen/daddy longlegs

The Travuniidae are a small family of harvestman with little more than ten described species, within the suborder Laniatores.

== Description ==
Travuniidae are at the most three millimeters long, with slender, unarmed legs and robust, strongly spined pedipalps.

== Distribution ==
Travuniidae have been found in Europe, Japan and the United States. Although some were described from Slovenia, these records proved to be erroneous.

== Relationships ==
Travuniidae are most closely related to Cladonychiidae; it is even possible that Travuniidae is paraphyletic in respect to this family.

== Name ==
The name of the type genus is derived from the Latin name of Trebinje, Bosnia and Herzegovina.

== Species ==
=== Peltonychiinae ===
- Peltonychia Roewer, 1935

- Peltonychia leprieurii (Lucas, 1860) — Buco Dell'Orso (cave, northern Italy)
- Peltonychia posteumicola (Roewer, 1935)
- Peltonychia gabria Roewer, 1935
- Peltonychia tenuis Roewer, 1935

=== Travuniinae ===
- Abasola Strand, 1928

- Abasola troglodytes (Roewer, 1915) — Dalmatia
- Abasola sarea Roewer, 1935 — Pyrenees
- Abasola hofferi Silhavy, 1937 — Yugoslavia

- Arbasus Roewer, 1935

- Arbasus caecus (Simon, 1911) — southern France

- Dinaria Hadzi, 1932 — palearctic
- Kratochvíliola Roewer, 1935 — palearctic

- Kratochvíliola navarica Roewer, 1935

- Speleonychia Briggs, 1974

- Speleonychia sengeri Briggs, 1974 — Washington

- Travunia Absolon & Kratochvíl, 1932

- Travunia jandai Kratochvíl, 1938 — Yugoslavia

=== incertae sedis ===
- Yuria Suzuki, 1964 — Japan

- Yuria pulcra Suzuki, 1964

- Yuria pulcra pulcra Suzuki, 1964
- Yuria pulcra briggsi Suzuki, 1975

- Buemarinoa Roewer, 1956

- Buemarinoa patrizii Roewer, 1956 — Sardinia
