= My Traitor =

2008 novel by Sorj Chalandon

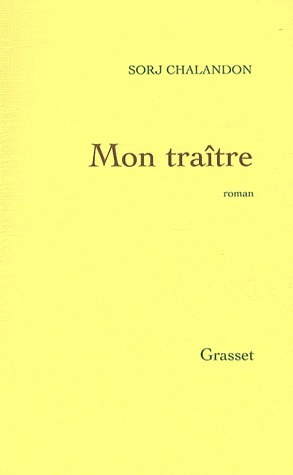
- Author: Sorj Chalandon
- Original title: Mon traître
- Language: French
- Publisher: Éditions Grasset
- Publication date: 9 January 2008
- Publication place: France
- English publication date: 6 June 2011
- Pages: 288
- ISBN: 9782246726111

My Traitor (French: Mon traître) is a 2008 novel by the French writer Sorj Chalandon. It is about a reclusive Frenchman who goes to Belfast in 1977, befriends a high-ranking IRA member and becomes involved in Northern Irish culture and nationalism over the next three decades. It was inspired by the case of Denis Donaldson.

The novel was the basis for a 2018 comic book by Pierre Alary.
