= Sorj Chalandon =

French writer and journalist (born 1952)

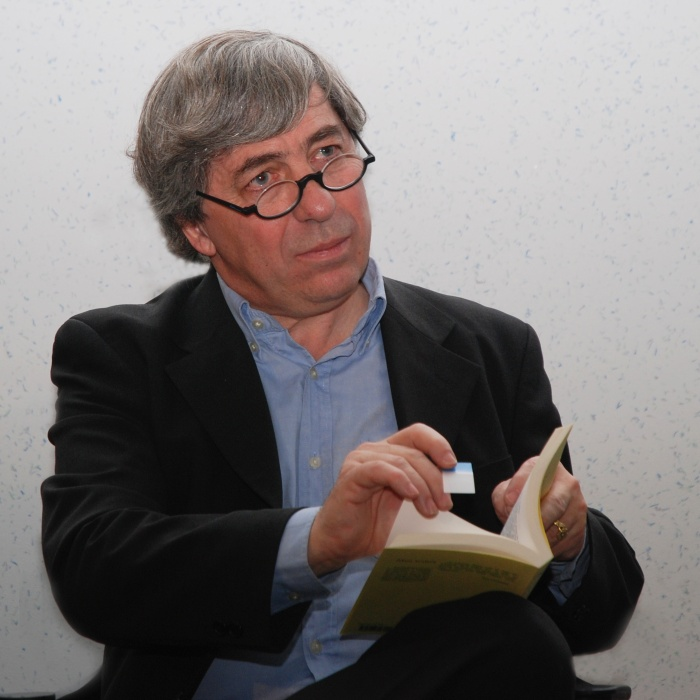
- Sorj Chalandon in December 2008
- Born: 16 May 1952 (age 74); Tunis, French Protectorate of Tunisia
- Occupations: Novelist, journalist
- Writing career
- Notable work: Return to Killybegs
- Notable awards: Albert Londres Prize; Prix Médicis; Grand Prix du roman de l'Académie française

Sorj Chalandon (born 16 May 1952) is a French writer and journalist.

== Biography ==
Chalandon grew up in Lyon with his parents and brother. His father was intensely paranoid and violent, making his family life difficult. When Chalandon was ten years old, his grandfather revealed to him that his father had been a Nazi collaborator during the Second World War, contrary to the heroic stories his father had told him throughout his childhood. It was not until 2020 that he knew the true nature and extent of his father's collaboration, six years after his father's death. His memoir on this subject, Enfant de salaud, was shortlisted for the Prix Goncourt in 2021.

At the age of 21, he became a cartoonist at Libération. He worked as a journalist for the newspaper from 1973 until 2007, where, among other things, he covered events in Lebanon, Iran, Iraq, Somalia and Afghanistan. In 1988 he received the Albert-Londres Prize for his articles on Northern Ireland and the Klaus Barbie trial. Since his departure from Libération, he has worked for the satirical-investigative newspaper Le Canard enchaîné.

After a long career in journalism, he turned to literature; he wrote Le Petit Bonzi in 2005, thinking that it would be his first and last novel. However, he went on to write several others, many of which have received literary prizes. His second novel, Une promesse (2006), won the Prix Médicis, and his 2011 novel Return to Killybegs won the Grand Prix du roman de l'Académie française and was shortlisted for the Prix Goncourt.

== Works ==
- Le Petit Bonzi (2005)
- Une promesse (2006, Prix Médicis)
- My Traitor (Mon traître, 2008)
- La Légende de nos pères (2009)
- Return to Killybegs (Retour à Killybegs, 2011, Grand Prix du roman de l'Académie française)
- The Fourth Wall (Le Quatrième Mur, Prix Goncourt des Lycéens 2013)
- Profession du père (2015)
- Le jour d'avant (2017)
- Une joie féroce (2019)
- Enfant de salaud (2021)
- L'Enragé (2023)
- Le livre de Kells (2025)
