= Éditions de l'Olivier =

French publishing house

The Éditions de l'Olivier are a French publishing house created by Olivier Cohen and located 96 Boulevard du Montparnasse, in the 14th arrondissement of Paris. Established in 1991, this company specializes in French and foreign literature.
