= Marc Dachy =

French art historian, publisher and translator

Marc Dachy (left) playing chess with John Cage

Marc Dachy (born November 5, 1952, in Mortsel (near Antwerp) Belgium - died October 8, 2015, in the 14th arrondissement of Paris) was a French art historian whose speciality was Dadaism and Surrealism, an art curator, a translator, lecturer and publisher. The Prix des Créateurs was awarded to Dachy in 1978 by Eugène Ionesco.

Dachy was the founder of Transedition, the publisher of the Luna Park Journal that published texts by Antonin Artaud, Alain Arias-Misson, Samuel Beckett, Bernard Blistène, Alain Borer, Joan Brossa, John Cage, E.E. Cummings, Arthur Cravan, Nicolas Charlet, Sophie Podolski, Brion Gysin, Daniil Harms, Yannick Haenel, Raoul Hausmann, Hannah Höch, Alain Jouffroy, Anselm Jappe, Takehisa Kosugi, Yves Klein, Pierre Restany, Gertrude Stein, Kate Steinitz, Virgil Thomson, Jacques Villeglé and Stéphane Zagdanski. The Journal was devoted partly to contemporary art creation and partly to the history of the avant-garde.

== Life and work ==
Marc Dachy was one of the main specialists of the Dada art movement (Tristan Tzara, for example) and Surrealism (André Breton, as example). He was the author of several works in the Dada/Surrealist field, one of them, Journal du mouvement Dada 1915-1923 (Journal of the Dada Movement 1915-1923), was awarded the Grand Prix du Livre d'Art in 1990 presented to Dachy by Jack Lang in the Louvre auditorium. Journal du mouvement Dada 1915-1923 was translated into English by Skira Rizzoli International. Other translations into English include his books Dada: The Revolt of Art, published by Harry N. Abrams, Inc in 2006 and The Dada Movement, published by Rizzoli in 1990.

Dachy's essay on Japanese Dadaism (the Mavo group) and Japanese neo-Dada extensions (Gutai) was published in Japan by Suiseisha. He had been a resident in Kyoto at Villa Kujoyama in 2000 to prepare his book Dada au Japon (PUF 2002). Dachy also published previously unpublished works by Louis Aragon (from his Dada period) as part of the Contemporary Literary History Project, a selection of texts by Clément Pansaers in 1986 (published by Gérard Lebovici / Champ Libre), letters by Francis Picabia in 1988 (also published by Gérard Lebovici) and a book of interviews with Raymond Hains.

In 1993 he was the general curator of the Biennial de Lyon, that he called And they all change the world: chosen from a poem by Julian Beck that had been published in the Luna Park Journal.

Dachy translated texts from English to French by the artists Gertrude Stein, John Cage, Piet Mondrian, La Monte Young and Kurt Schwitters published by Ivrea, as well as texts by Eugène Jolas and Theo van Doesburg. He edited a special Dada issue of Literary Magazine (no 446, October in 2005). Dachy has also collaborated on various art catalogs, such as Cocteau (2003), Danser sa vie (2011) at the Centre Pompidou, A Theater without Theater for MACBA in Barcelona (2007) and Van Doesburg and the International Avant-garde for the Tate Modern in London in 2009.

Dachy died on October 8, 2015, in Paris of cancer.

== Published Works ==
- Des énergies transformatrices du langage, Paris, Fondation nationale des arts graphiques et plastiques, 1980
- Avant-Gardes et nouvelle typographie au XXe siècle, Paris, Centre national de documentation pédagogique, 1985
- Gertrude Stein, Préface de Paul Bowles, Culoz, Le Clos Poncet, 1987
- Journal du Mouvement Dada 1915-1923, Genève, Albert Skira, 1989 which won the Grand Prix du livre d'Art in 1990
- Tristan Tzara, dompteur des acrobates, Paris, L'Echoppe, 1992
- Dada & les dadaïsmes, Gallimard, coll. Folio Essais, 1994 (no 257) et 2011 (no 540)
- Raymond Hains / Marc Dachy, Langue de cheval et facteur temps, entretien, Le Collège/ FRAC Champagne-Ardenne, Actes Sud, 1998
- Dada au Japon, PUF, Perspectives critiques, 2002
- L’objection de la date. L’avant-garde en art: le point de vue Situationniste face à Dada et aux néo-dadas in Archives et Documents situationnistes, Paris, Denoël, no 2, Automne 2002
- Dada, la révolte de l'art, Gallimard, coll. « Découvertes Gallimard/Arts » (no 476), 2005
- Archives Dada / Chronique, Hazan, 2005
- Skywriting in Le Purple Journal, Paris, no 3, hiver 2005
- Dada, un jeu fou avec le néant, with Yannick Haenel and François Meyronnis in Ligne de risque, Entretiens, Paris, Gallimard, coll. L’Infini, 2005
- Poussière d'or, in L'Infini, Paris, no 105, Winter 2008
- La cathédrale de la misère érotique [d'un rythme supérieur en architecture : le merzbau de kurt schwitters], Sens Et Tonka, 2015
- Il y a des journalistes partout. De quelques coupures de presse relatives à Tristan Tzara et André Breton, Paris, Gallimard, coll. L'Infini, 2015
- Clément Pansaers, Bar Nicanor, texts collected by Marc Dachy, Gérard Lebovici editions, 1986
- Francis Picabia: Letters to Christine, presentation, chronology and bibliography by Marc Dachy, Gérard Lebovici editions, 1988
- Kurt Schwitters, Merz, selected writings, translated and presented by Marc Dachy, translated with Corinne Graber, Ivrea editions, 1990
- Kurt Schwitters, Anna Blume, edition established and translated by Marc Dachy, translated with Corinne Graber, Ivrea editions, 1994
- Kurt Schwitters, established and translated by Marc Dachy, translated with Corinne Graber editions Ivrea, 1994
- Marcel Duchamp, The Creative Act, preface by Marc Dachy for Sub Rosa (label), CD SR 57, 1994
- Antonin Artaud, To put an end to the judgment of God, preface by Marc Dachy, Sub Rosa (label), CD 1995
- La Monte Young, Conference 1960, edition established and translated by Marc Dachy, éditions éolienes, 1998
- STENCIL PROJECT PARIS 2004, Orsay, Criteria, “urbanity 2”, 2004
- DADA ANTI-DADA MERZ sound recording by Hans Arp, Raoul Hausmann and Kurt Schwitters, preface by Marc Dachy for Sub Rosa (label), 2005.
- John Cage / Marcel Duchamp, éditions éolienes, 2005

== Correspondence and bibliography ==
- Guy Debord's letters to Marc Dachy appear in volume 7 of the Correspondence of Guy Debord published by Fayard in 2008
- A testimony and an important letter from Marc Dachy to Guy Debord on the situation of the Champ libre editions following the death of Floriana Lebovici appear in The obscure days of Gérard Lebovici by Jean-Luc Douin (Stock, 2004).
- A letter from Marc Dachy appears in the 2009 catalog of Éditions de l'Encyclopédie des Nuisances.
