= Stéphane Zagdanski =

French writer

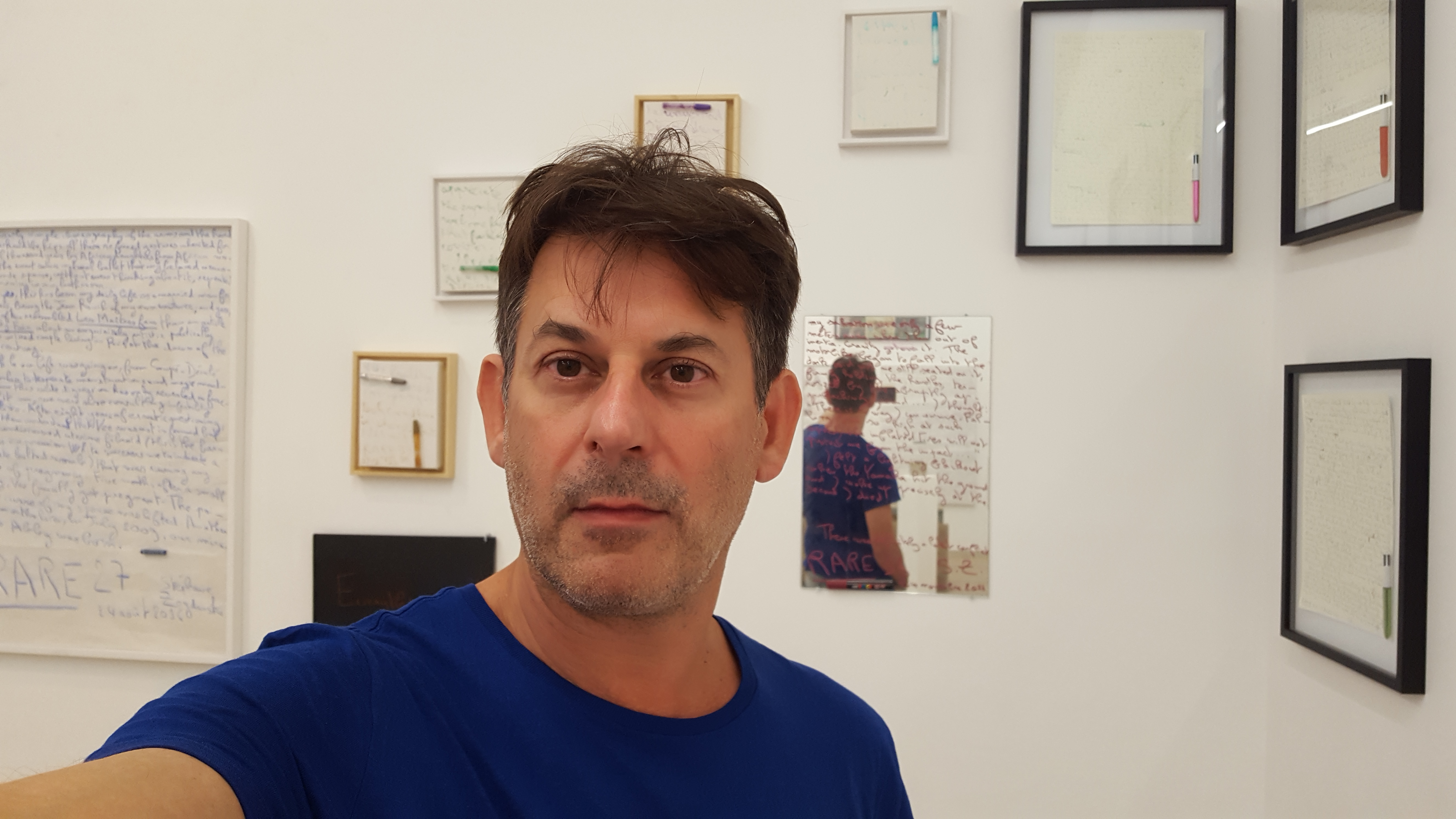
- Zagdanski in 2016
- Born: 28 April 1963 (age 63); Paris
- Occupations: Novelist, essayist, artist
- Website: parolesdesjours.free.fr

Stéphane Zagdanski is a French novelist, essayist and contemporary artist born on 28 April 1963 in Paris, France.

== Biography ==
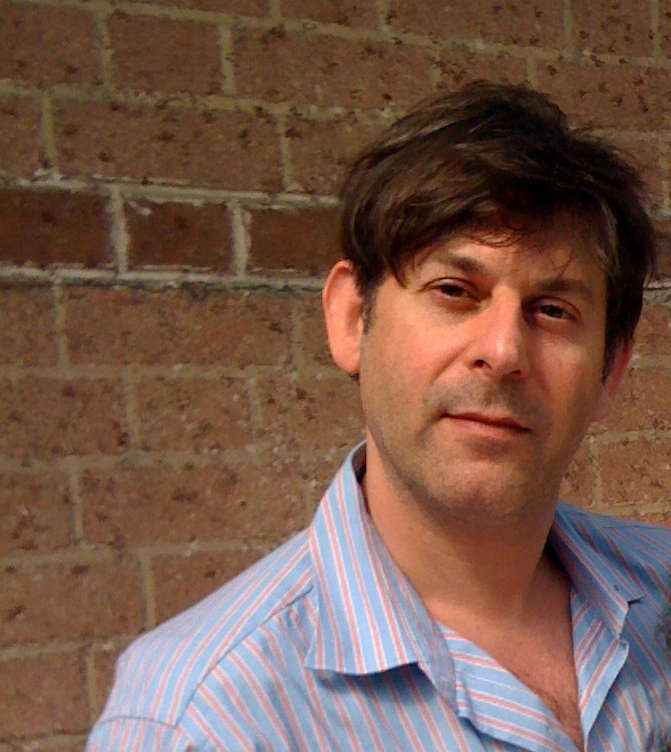
Zagdanski in 2010

Stéphane Zagdanski is the third son of a Jewish family, whose grandparents emigrated from Poland in the beginning of the 20th century.

Shortly before his birth, his parents and two brothers moved to the western suburb of Paris, where Zagdanski had a childhood that, in his memoires, he describes as perfectly happy.

When he was 20 years old, while pursuing philosophy studies at the Sorbonne, he read Emmanuel Levinas which introduced him to the Talmud and to Jewish Thought, with which he was immediately enthused; he perceived in it a combination of profundity and imagination of a kind typical, in his view, to Literature.

When he was 23 years old, he earned his philosophy degree, inspired by the work of Emmanuel Levinas, and at the same time wrote a first—theological-erotic—novel which remains unpublished. As soon as he obtained his degree, he left the university to devote himself exclusively to writing.

== Chronology of publications ==
=== First journal and revue publications ===
In December 1987, the revue Pardes (founded and edited by Shmuel Trigano) published his first study dedicated to Jewish thought, titled "The Flesh and The Word", which was reprinted in 2003 in the collection of his essays Fini de rire. This essay is a reflection on incarnation organized around the theme of putrefaction as developed in Rabbinic literature.

In October 1989, the revue Les Temps Modernes published a study—titled "Signs of Time, an essay on temporality in Rabbinic literature and in Kafka's The Castle," in which Zagdanski combined a meditation on The Castle with reflections on Time in Jewish Thought. This essay was reprinted in 2003 in the collection Fini de rire.

=== L'Impureté de Dieu (The Impurity of God) ===
In 1991, éditions du Félin published his first book, L'impureté de Dieu: La lettre et le peché dans la pensée juive (The Impurity of God: the letter and sin in Jewish Thought). With an hommage to Jewish Mysticism and Thought, Zagdanski returns to some aspects of his study "The Flesh and The Word" and attempts to analyze the theme of impurity in accordance with various Biblical and Rabbinic perspectives, among which are the creation of the world, original sin, the babelization of language, hermeneutics, ritual, etc. "The result," wrote John Gelder, "is a surprising, invigorating or obsessional dialogue with words, like a casually playful God."

In 2005, éditions du Félin published a second edition with a new preface and the title L'Impureté de Dieu: Souillures et Scissions dans la pensée juive (The Impurity of God: Stains and Scissions in Jewish Thought).

=== Céline seul (Céline Alone) ===
In 1993, Gallimard, in the collection L'infini edited by Philippe Sollers, published this book length essay in which Zagdanski seeks to resolve the complex question of Céline's anti-Semitism, and the cathartic role this pamphleteering rage and fury could play in the elaboration of his novelist genius. "Zagdanski's method," John Gelder wrote, "is a fascinating approach to Céline's texts and statements: a Talmudic method—the author plainly says so, which confronts different interpretative levels with one another, and does not provide conclusions on behalf of and instead of the reader."

=== Le sexe de Proust (The sexuality of Proust) ===
Zagdanski continued with the parallel he established, in Céline seul, between Celine and Proust, in Le sexe de Proust (Gallimard / L'infini 1994), a book length essay in which he questions the imaginary boundaries between "normality" and "homosexuality" in À la recherche du temps perdu, boundaries that Proust, according to Zagdanski, never prohibited himself from crossing in thought.

"His extraordinarily captivating demonstration," wrote Jacques Franck, "aims to establish that "the primordial revelation of the Recherche is the heterosexuality of writing, which Proust discovered only is as much he himself was heterosexual in soul, as he was circumcised of heart. Soul…body…heart…spirit, a whole—Catholic—theology, outside of which it is as ridiculous to claim to read Proust as it is to hope to make a Mormon like de Sade." "

=== De l'antisémitisme (On Anti-Semitism) ===
In 1995, Julliard published Zagdanski's De l'antisémitisme, a book on "the Jewish Question" considered in the light of midrashic exegesis of the story of Balaq and Balaam in the book of Numbers; an exegesis interwoven with dialogues with two imaginary, anagrammatic accomplice interlocutors, as well as with numerous real-life narratives. "Neither study, no thesis, nor pamphlet," wrote Josyane Savigneau, "here is a kind of treatise, very personal, paradoxical and provocative like its author, combining private journal, novel (dialogues with characters who are kinds of the author's doubles), essay, and ceaselessly playing on and with digression and ridicule." Publication of Zagdanski's fourth book was occasion for Sébastien Lapaque to emphasize the unity of the author's approach pursued since L'impureté de Dieu: "Zagdanski is building a coherent body of work. He does not abandon a subject once he has treated of it, but rather reintegrates it into his reflection which is continually advancing, colliding with and displacing the received ideas in his path."

=== Les intérêts du temps (The Benefits of Time) ===
Zagdanski's first novel, Les intérêts du temps, published in 1996 by Gallimard in the series L'infini, explores the global ravages of computerized society through the itinerary of a learned young man named "Martin Heidegger", who is interested in ancient Greek literature, and who is confronted with the grotesque behind the scenes machinations of a culture magazine. The novel's narrator interweaves dubious and nihilist characters in the guises of the period he describes.

"Stéphane Zagdanski means to give a complete vision of the period," wrote Eliane Tonnet-Lacroix. "His first novel, Les intérêts du temps, presents itself as a kind of "agenda" of the hero, Martin Heidegger, a writer and thinker like his namesake (the reference to the philosopher of Being, who condemned the reign of Technique, is revealing). Alternating between comedic scenes, learned conversations, and acerbic and paradoxical reflections, Zagdanski produces, with brilliance and an obvious sense of provocation, a ferocious depiction of our technological, sexualized, mediatized world, in which it is simulacrum of culture as well as of love that rule."

Philippe Forest, in his analysis of the novel, wrote: "From September to September, the reader follows a year in the life of a young writer. In its course, the novel offers different definitions of itself. It presents itself as a kind of agenda, composed in the margins wherein time writes of itself, revealing the fiction of its why, the threads of its how. From this comes the eminently fluid structure of a novel that joyously lets multiply within itself the moments played on the written stage of perception and thought."

=== Mes Moires (My Moïra) ===
At the age of 33, Zagdanski wrote his memoires, titled Mes Moires and published by Julliard in 1997. With regard to the title, the author writes: "Don't explain. The shimmering flashes of my memory. The coincident-accident weft and weave of my "I", the lot and emblazon of my words, etc." The text consists of short, untitled notations, modeled on Nietzsche's Aurora, wherein Zagdanski discloses the combative career of a young writer, and evokes the resistances to his writings that he had to outwit, before they were published—up until the publication of L'impureté de Dieu. He also describes a number of erotic encounters, publishes a portion of his correspondence, and concludes the book--after reproduction of an EKG obtained in a pharmacy, with the reiteration of his joy in living, what is called, a resurrectional life.

"Stéphane Zagdanski," wrote Marlène Amar, "provokes, titillates, plays with and upon the reader, serenades him with virtuosity, taking him from pleasure to anger, from despondency to jubilation, only in the end to leave him hanging, with the haughty declaration: "The human kind is not my kind.""

=== Miroir amer (Bitter Mirror) ===
Zagdanski's second novel, Miroir amer (Gallimard / L'infini 1999), is about genetic experimentation with life and meditates on what connects birth and death. In the novel, we learn of the trials and travails of a man who cannot come to terms with his own conception through in vitro fertilization. This novel is also a critique of the delusions and deceptions of what it names "Technique" in the lives of human beings, and the title's double meaning evokes the blindness of a reflection that has become the sole horizon of destiny ("amer"/"bitter", also means, in nautical terminology, the reference point by which a ship navigates).

In his analysis of the novel, Philippe Forest lists the themes with which Zagdanski treats: "He touches here upon a mine of particularly dense and profound meaning (childhood and death, sexuality and technique, identity and twinhood; the reader will perhaps be surprised that these provide the subject matter for a novel as elliptical as Miroir amer. With its often overwritten style, its discontinuous intrigue broken up into a series of fluffy scenes, with its characters absent to the tragedy of their own life, Zagdanski's new novel can sound strange to the ears of a reader accustomed to a more naturalist treatment of these same themes. But it would be wrong to too quickly impute to its bizarre tone a clumsiness or confusion of purpose. In fact, Miroir amer takes us into this world according to Technique which is already our own and in which every form of interiority is as if voided and discarded."

During this same period, Zagdanski wrote a kind of appendix to Miroir amer, published, in August 1999, in the revue L'infini, in the form of a critical study of the latest excesses of Technique, titled "The Idolatrous Science". This study concludes with an exegesis of the portion from Genesis on the sterility of Rachel and Jacob's experiments to propagate the flock of sheep given to him by his uncle and father-in-law Laban. This essay was reprinted in 2003 in the collection Fini de rire.

=== Pauvre de Gaulle! (Poor de Gaulle!) ===
In March 2000, Zagdanski published Pauvre de Gaulle! (éditions Pauvert/Fayard). This novel recounts in comic and sarcastic mode a century of French history, through the emblematic figure of General de Gaulle. The 580 page book presents itself at once as: a critical pamphlet on de Gaulle's life, work and ideological influences (from his grandmother Josephine's moralistic writings to his last visit with Franco, the year before his death); as the narrative of the writing of the book itself, describing the reactions to the project by those close to him—his Brazilian fiancée, his editor, his writer friends; and as the account of a month spent in London, in which the narrator is inspired by the exile of a few writers who preceded him in Britain's capital. The narrator also tells the story of his father's family during the Nazi Occupation of Paris. Pauvre de Gaulle! is thus a hybrid composed of novel, personal journal, pamphlet, historical essay, and travel narrative.

With regard to Pauvre de Gaulle!, Jean-Pierre Salgas compares Zagdanski to Gombrowicz: "In its best pages (the derisory pastiche of de Gaulle-like destiny: Zagdanski exiled in London, in the language of Shakespeare and Churchill, in the country of Freud at the end of his life), Zagdanski can remind one of Gombrowicz of the novel "Trans-Atlantic", confronted with a polonized France in abject adoration before its totem."

It was also at the beginning of 2000 that Stéphane Zagdanski met Viviane, the young Central African women whom he married in July of the same year, and who will become the model for the main character of his novel Noire est la beauté (Beauty herself is black).

=== Autour du désir (Around Desire) ===
In Spring 2001, Éditions du Passeur published Autour du désir defined by Zagdanski as a "theater piece". This is a series of short intimate dialogues between a man and a woman about whom we know nothing: the woman begins by asking the man why he never tells her he loves her, the man tries to justify himself, she cries quietly. Gradually, they talk about desire and everything it entails, evoking memories, discussing paintings and texts...At the end of the play, they make love, we hear their joy, the curtain falls. Their dialogues are interspersed with brief philosophical and theological digressions on the theme of desire, primarily in the paintings of Picasso, as well as in ancient mythology and in Jewish Thought.

=== Noire est la beauté (Beauty herself is black) ===
The novel Noire est la beauté (published September 2001 by Pauvert/Fayard); a love story between a French painter and a Central African woman, aspires to treat of the spiritual combat between darkness and light, the West and Africa, insipid colorless blandness and vivacious living color. Noire est la beauté also provides a portrait of the small Central African community in Paris, through their conversations, their arguments, their customs, their music, their hopes and their language (Sango, the language spoken by a majority of Central Africans).

"More than a tale of love," wrote Aude Lancelin, "Noire est la beauté" is the account of a liaison between Stéphane Zagdanski and a different sort of romantic novel. The author, these last years, of self-fictional pamphlets effervescent with intelligence and narcissistic voluptuous delight, this time chose to dip his pen in rose water, and to orient himself in this genre "which is not my genre", even adopted the most redoubtable of guides, Vladimir Nabokov, who is obliquely quoted on several occasions."

=== Paroles des jours (Words of the Day) ===
In 2001, Zagdanski also started Paroles des jours, an on-line Literature and Philosophy site whose self-declared purpose is to serve as a revue that is independent of any editorial, academic, or media interference and censorship. There are no biographies or bibliographies of the authors whom it publishes, no links to on-line book stores, just texts, audio and video recordings of talks, lectures, conversations with contemporary writers (among whom are Gérard Guest, François Meyronnis, François Fédier, Bernard Sichère, Éric Marty, Yannick Haenel), on various themes and authors including Nietzsche, Debord, Heidegger, Homer, Jewish Thought, The Hebrew Bible, The Talmud, Kabbalah, Islam, Film, and the Global Economy. There are as well rare archive audio and video recordings of writers, artists, and musicians. The complete contents of Paroles des jours is also archived and made available on a WordPress based site Archives de Paroles des jours: Paroles des jours and the Archive are complemented by and maintained in tandem with a Paroles des jours Facebook page.

Starting in 2007, Paroles des jours organized, and made available as audio and video recordings), the Philosophy seminar by Gérard Guest, whose overall title is "Investigations à la limite, une phénoménologie de l'extrême" ("Investigations at the limit, a phenomenology of the extreme"). The seminar concluded in 2014. The collected complete recordings of the seminar, which may be downloaded as MP3's, are available at the website Archives du Séminaire de Gérard Guest (2007-2014).

In 2014, Zagdanski started two other blogs, associated and linked with Paroles des jours: Conversations autour de la pensée juive (Conversations Around Jewish Thought) and Sur l'antisémitisme de Martin Heidegger (On the Anti-Semitism of Martin Heidegger). The latter "brings together studies in several languages (French, English, German) on Martin Heidegger's anti-Semitism from the point of view of Thinking about Being."

=== La Vérité nue (The Naked Truth) ===
In April 2002, Pauvert/Fayard published La Vérité nue, co-written with Alina Reyes; a "learned, merry and combative duet," Aude Lancelin observed, "also to be read as a counter against the new "sexual correctness" channeled, according to them, by contemporary novels and the media. An ideological campaign directed against the destitution of bodies and the spiritual poverty, which they attempt in turn to resist through deciphering the diktats of the neurotic-erotic-porno market and a celebration of great artists."

In the French magazine VSD, Pascale Tournier observed a consistency between the cover photograph and the purpose of La Vérité nue: "A very interesting collection of conversations about their views on the evolution of morals and in which the theme of sexuality most often reoccurs. The book's tone is set by its cover, which shows the two authors naked. They claim for themselves a healthy, positive relationship to the body. To counter the ambient sexual impoverishment, they both in their nudity reveal a personal sensuality, beauty and sexuality freed from media diktats."

=== Les joies de mon corps, Fini de rire (The Joys of My Body, The Joke Is Over) ===
In 2004, Pauvert/Fayard published two collections of Zagdanski's essays; Les joies de mon corps is subtitled an "Anthology" and Fini de rire is subtitled "Studies". The former collection is composed of shorter texts, for the most part published in journals, magazines, or literary revues. There are also autobiographical narratives and interviews, as well as divertimenti on the classics: from the Pre-Socratics to Guy Debord including le Roman de Renart (The Tale of Reynard the Fox) and Chateaubriand's Mémoires d'outre-tombe (Memoires from Beyond the Grave); on painters, from Lascaux to Picasso including Tiepolo and Piazetta; and on a few other currently living authors, such as Philip Roth and Philippe Sollers.

Fini de rire is composed of full-length essays, some of which were previously unpublished. The preface, titled "Le Corps de Dieu" ("The Body of God") returns to Zagdanski's affiliation with Jewish Mysticism and Thought. The post-face, titled "Tricherie sur la substance, Défense et illustration de la pensée juive" ("Cheating on Substance, a Defense and Illustration of Jewish Thought"), is a critique of linguist and translator Henri Meschonnic's positions on both Biblical Hebrew and Martin Heidegger's Thought.

=== La Mort dans l'oeil (Death in the Eye) ===
The fruit of three years work, published in September 2004 by Éditions Maren Sell, La Mort dans l'oeil is subtitled Critique du cinema, comme vision, domination, falsification, eradication, fascination, manipulation, devastation, usurpation (A critique of cinema as vision, domination, falsification, eradication, manipulation, devastation, and usurpation). Proceeding according to a line-by-line analysis of Plato's Timaeus, it delivers a critical reflection with regard to metaphysical aspects or cinema and to phenomena which, according to Zagdanski, are integrally and intimately connected to it, such as daguerreotype, the "human zoos", video games, advertising, "RealTV", etc. The book is also a meditation on the compared origins and foundations of the Image (in the technical sense of an industrially, commercially reproducible reflection) and of the Word (which, according to Zagdanski, unveils itself in flashes in the works of the greatest geniuses of Literature). In November 2004, the filmmaker Jean-Luc Godard, after he had read La Mort dans l'oeil (and whom the book had not spared from critique), proposed to Zagdanski a dialogue, to be broadcast on radio, on the subjects of cinema and literature. An edited version of their dialogue was broadcast on France-Culture and printed in le Nouvel-Observateur. The complete video of the dialogue is available on Paroles des jours and in the Archive de Paroles des jours.

=== Jouissance du temps (Enjoyment of Time) ===
In 2005, Editions Fayard published Zagdanski's Jouissance du temps, a collection of short stories, each of which is a variation on the theme of Eros, each written according to a different perspective and in a different style. "Stéphane Zagdanski's twelve short stories," wrote Hugo Marsan on 4 March 2005 issue of Le Monde, "opens phantasmagoric spaces that are rare in literature: the credible collision between the hyper-realism of our time and the myths of the origin of the world; sexual voraciousness joined with ultra hip and trendy modes of communication. In the story with the book's title, "Jouissance du temps", the rite of lovemaking is a slow voyeuristic exploration, likened to a mystic quest. The story "DQ2005" describes, with an unbridled humor, a Don Quixote who logs on line as dq2005@hébété.com ("hébété" is French for "dazed") in search of a mad Dulcinea who is adept at piercing. The story "La Matrice d'art" ("The Womb of Art") is a marvel: a man exhausts himself convincing a woman, Lise, of his artistic enthusiasms, until he discovers that the vulva of his mistress expert contains in its membranes and folds perfectly condensed, moving miniatures of masterworks...This non-conformity should not deceive us: Zagdanski's stupefying inventions sublimize human destiny."

=== Debord ou la Diffraction du temps (Debord or the Diffraction of Time) ===
In 2008, Gallimard published Debord ou la Diffraction du temps, devoted to the subject of Guy Debord, whose name and writings Zagdanski has regularly evoked since his novel Les Intérêts du temps. Zagdanski analyzes and comments on various aspects of Debord's life, thought, and work; aspects each of which he illuminates according to Debord's principle of the non-distinction between his theory, his practice, and his daily life. In addition, Heidegger's thought about "the They Self" and "Ereignis" is an essential nexus of interpretation for Zagdanski.

In his critique of Debord ou la Diffraction du temps, Cécile Guilbert defines the book's style as follows: "Opus no. 15 turns out to be perfectly "Zagdanskian"...In its themes: time, strategy, play, style, poetry, eroticism, sovereignty—which contribute to the definition of genius as a "virtuoso of truth", which is admirably fitting for Debord (1931 – 1994), the radical critic theoretician whose impeccable thought the author here x-rays in a kaleidoscopic manner; as well as in its style which, with its cascades of adjectives preceding a verb and its alliterative pulse, propels a vivacity as caustic, ironic, and satiric as it is empathetic. Attempting a fecund rapprochement with Heidegger, Zagdanski does not however avoid certain confusions, and blind spots remain. Why the silence about Debord's enormous debt to Dada and surrealism in the history of what Nietzsche diagnosed as "European nihilism"? Why refuse to see that Debord, the last "working" nihilist, remains despite everything a "metaphysician"? Why also (and retrospectively) did Zagdanski "forget", in his virulent critique of cinema (La Mort dans l'oeil, Éditions Maren Sell), Debord's own critique, whose burden of subversion he seems to so much defend today? So many "empty" silences which, far from diminishing the interest of this novel exercise of admiration, should rather stimulate its polemical readings."

Jean Zebulon compares Stéphane Zagdanski's style to the style of jazz pianist Thelonious Monk: "A style that swings like the music of Thelonious Monk swings. A same kind of luminous, acid, fragile, syncopated, free, impromptu language, full of surprise, and just as inspired…"

=== Chaos brûlant (Burning Chaos) ===
This novel, Zagdanski's most recent to date (2014), published by Seuil in August 2012, is an account of the Summer of 2011, the themes of which are the Dominique Strauss Kahn sex scandal and the 2008 financial crisis. The novel's narrator is a refugee schizophrenic, named "Bag 'O Bones" (he has a skeleton tattoo over his entire body), in the Manhattan Psychiatric Center in New York City, who claims the ability to read people's thoughts. He thus describes, from 'the inside', the motivations of DSK, of Nafissatou Diallo, and of all the other protagonists in this scandal that was globally covered by the media. The narrator is aided in his investigations of the apocalyptic consequences and by-products of the contemporary world by several other psychotic companions with names like "Luc Ifer", "Franz Kafka", "Antonin Artaud", "Sigmund Freud", "Karl Marx", "Guy D.", each of whom provides his own version of the immediate events, while commenting, in a very raw, indeed cruel manner, upon the global destiny of the modern world. In the French weekly news magazine Le Point's website, Marion Cocquet wrote: "Civilization is only a thin film over a burning chaos." It is Nietzsche who (with this epigraph) opens the novel, and it is he even more than its title that gives the novel its hue: its cruel lucidity, its delectable nastiness. Chaos brûlant is a monster novel, a learned beast of a novel, dizzying and disturbing."

The Blog for Chaos brûlant includes a section of articles and interviews translated into English from the original French by Robert G. Margolis.

== Pamphilms ==
Debord au Commissariat, ou l'éclairante altercation (Debord at the Commissariat, or the illuminating altercation)

In Spring 2013, Stephane Zagdanski put on line, on the site Paroles des jours, a pamphleteering film, what he calls a "pamphilm", conceived and put together by himself, titled "Debord at the Commissariat, or the illuminating altercation". It is a detailed critique of the exposition at the National Library of France devoted to Guy Debord, and was occasioned by a virulent altercation on the radio between the writer and the organizer of the exposition.

Zagdanski contre Sollers

In February 2014, Zagdanski put on line, on the Paroles des jours site, a new "pamphilm", more than four hours long, divided into twelve chapters, titled Zagdanski contre Sollers. Taking as its pretext a malevolent, spiteful remark made about him by the writer Philippe Sollers in a magazine interview, Zagdanski returns to his relations with the person who had been his editor and friend since 1992, and then to their falling out starting in 2000. Zagdanski's film uses the occasion to describe the influence of nihilism on an original, intelligent and cultivated intellectual, who ends by declining into anti-Judaic and confused hypocrisy with regard to Heidegger's thought on "the last god".

== Graphic and Artistic Works ==
=== Video Letters with Maria de Medeiros ===
From September 2014, Paul Ouazan, who made a documentary about Stéphane Zagdanski, asks him and the actress, singer and movie maker Maria de Medeiros, to exchange short videos taken with their smartphones. Twenty video letters are made by the two artists, who don't know each other, composing a long dialog about art, literature, danse, singing, music, news, philosophy, private memories and autobiographical fragments. The twenty letters are online, in French and German, on Arte Creative website, dedicated to contemporary art.

=== RARE: Novel, Concept, Artwork ===
In 2014, Zagdanski began an autobiographical art project titled: RARE: Novel, Concept, Artwork. It is an autobiographical novel intended for exhibition rather than conventional publication, since each page is handwritten as a singular work of art, either on calligraphic paintings, photos, or videos. "Zagdanski", explains Claire Fleury in L'Obs, "handwrites his new novel in english on paintings and naked bodies... RARE, therefore, is the first novel he won't publish, but expose... He also writes on sand, naked women, street walls..., then he shoots or films the page and expose it on pictures or tablets."
An internet site, in English and in French, is dedicated to Zagdanski's new project, following page after page the writing of this new kind of novel which combines both worlds of literature and contemporary art.

=== Dissolving memoirs ===
In June 2017, Zagdanski begins the complete calligraphy of the 533 paragraphs from his memoirs, published twenty years ago by Julliard Publishing House.

He names his paintings and drawings, only made of sentences became unreadable by crossing each other, his "words mandalas", thinking of the sand mandalas in Tibetan Buddhism, which are dissolved as soon as they are composed.

== Exhibitions ==
=== Solo exhibitions ===
- In September 2016, Gallery Eric Dupont in Paris organized Zagdanski's first personal exhibition, showing all the paintings, photos, videos and sculptures composing RARE. At this occasion, Éric Dupont and Stéphane Zagdanski copublished the printed version of the novel, given for free to any buyer of one of the 100 artworks.
- From 18 January to 3 March 2018, Modernism Gallery exhibits in San Francisco a new solo show by Zagdanski, made of 12 works from the serie Jouissance du temps (Enjoyment of time), each artwork being a complete short story abstractly calligraphied. On her Instagram account, the San Francisco Chronicle journalist Carolyn Zinko explains: "He paints all the words to a single short story on each canvas, layering them so that eventually, their meaning is concealed. But in doing so, he reveals something about his feelings and state of mind — through the colors and the abstractions he creates."

=== Collective exhibitions ===
- March 2017 : Drawing Now Paris, Boot Galerie Éric Dupont
- November 2017: Paris Photo, Boot Galerie Éric Dupont
- December 2017: Salon Galeristes, Boot Galerie Éric Dupont
- October–December 2018: À l'heure du dessin, 6ème temps: Tracé, Château de Servières (Marseille)
- November 2018 : Salon Galeristes, Boot Galerie Éric Dupont

== Audiovisual production ==
Café Picouly

In 2003, Zagdanski conceived of and wrote a new cultural program for television, produced in 2005 by Catherine Barma, hosted by the writer Daniel Picouly and broadcast (apart from one year on France 2) on France 5. The program was broadcast weekly until May 2011.

Pop-uP

In October 2014, Zagdanski invented a new concept of social television, called Pop-Up, meant for fans of international pop stars and users of Internet TV.

== Bibliography ==
Essays

- L'Impureté de Dieu : Souillures et Scissions dans la pensée juive, Éditions du Félin, 1991 (rééd. revue et augmentée, 2005)
- Céline seul, Gallimard, 1993
- Le Sexe de Proust, Gallimard, 1994
- De l'antisémitisme, Julliard, 1995 (rééd. revue et augmentée, Climats Flammarion, 2006),
- La Mort dans l'œil : Critique du cinéma comme vision, domination, falsification, éradiction, fascination, manipulation, dévastation, usurpation, Maren Sell Éditeurs, 2004
- Debord ou la Diffraction du temps, Gallimard, 2008

Novels

- Les Intérêts du temps, Gallimard, 1996
- Miroir amer, Gallimard, 1999
- Pauvre de Gaulle !, Pauvert, 2000
- Noire est la beauté, Pauvert 2001 (rééd. Le Livre de Poche, 2003)
- Chaos brûlant, Le Seuil, 2012

Plays

- Autour du désir, Le Passeur, 2001

Study

- La Vérité nue (avec Alina Reyes), dialogue, Pauvert, 2002
- Fini de rire, Études, Pauvert, 2003
- Les Joies de mon corps, Florilège, Pauvert, 2003
- Paysage avec Don Quichotte (avec Ph. Fretz, Stéphane Fretz et Stéphane Zaech, art&fiction, 2005

Mémoire

- Mes Moires, Julliard, 1997

Short-story

- Jouissance du temps, Fayard, 2005

== Sources ==
- Die Nacht/La Nuit #74, un film de Paul Ouazan consacré à Stéphane Zagdanski (production Arte, avril 2008).
- Résurrection de Proust by Stéphane Zagdanski, a movie by Jean-Hugues Larché, Collection Penseurs du Vingt et Un (Production R de Paradis, June 2008
- Le Procès Céline, Alain Moreau, Antoine de Meaux, interview of Stephane Zagdanski, (Arte Éditions, octobre 2011)
- Philippe Forest,
1. De Tel Quel à l'infini, Allaphbed 2, Éditions Cécile Defaut, 2006
2. Le Roman, le réel: un roman, est-il encore possible?, Pleins Feux, 1999
- Éliane Tonnet-Lacroix, La Littérature française et francophone de 1945 à l'an 2000, L'Harmattan, 2003
