= Alain Borer =

French poet

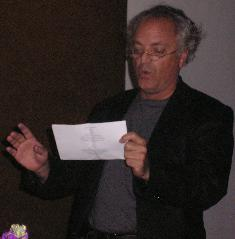
- Born: Luxeuil-les-Bains, France

Philosophical work
- Region: Writer, poet, playwright
- Main interests: Arthur Rimbaud; poetry; theater

Alain Borer is a French poet, travel writer, novelist, playwright, art critic, essayist, and specialist in the life and works of Arthur Rimbaud.

== Early life and education ==
Alain Borer was raised in Luxeuil-les-Bains, France. He received his Middle and High School education at the Institut Florimont in Geneva, Switzerland, where he founded and directed the student journal Le Bateau Ivre.

In 1970, in Nancy, France, during the first year of a preparatory class for the entrance exam at the Ecole Normale Supérieure, directing again the student journal, he published a first book of poems, fi (published by Parisod in Lausanne, Switzerland). The following year, in Paris, where he pursued his studies in the humanities at the “khâgne” section of the Lycée Henri-IV, he entered in contact with writer and photographer Denis Roche and the poets of the avant-garde literary magazine Tel Quel. They would become the subject of his doctoral dissertation at the University of Paris VII, written under the direction of Julia Kristeva. In 1976, he travelled to Ethiopia, in the footsteps of Arthur Rimbaud, in preparation of the film Le Voleur de feu by Charles Brabant, with Léo Ferré, diffused on French television (TF1) in 1978. In the same year, he directed for Radio France the audiotapes collection Rimbaud, read by Laurent Terzieff.

== Career ==
Working as a limousine driver in order to pay for his studies, he published Souvenirs d’un chauffeur de maître (Memories of a Master Chauffeur) in Les Temps Modernes, May 1978.

In 1979 he was appointed at the Ecole Supérieure des Beaux-Arts de Tours-Angers-Le Mans as teacher of art theory, where he remained until 2014. He became visiting professor of French Literature at the University of Southern California in 2005.

Borer has been president of the national annual poetry festival Printemps des Poètes, president of the Robert Ganzo Poetry Prize (sponsored by the Fondation de France), and president of the International Association of the Friends of Arthur Rimbaud. He teaches a regular poetry workshop at the Nouvelle Revue Française (NRF – Editions Gallimard).

His name is associated with that of Arthur Rimbaud, to whom he has devoted 30 years of his life, at least. While gathering what he calls a complete “rimbaldothèque”—all the publications worldwide of Rimbaud's works from 1870 to 2000 --, Alain Borer explores the tracks of Arthur Rimbaud, his works and his journeys. He traveled to all the places on the map of what he calls “Rimbaldia”—from Charleville to Java, from Marseille to London to Stockholm, from Harderwijk to Harar, and from Cyprus to Yemen. He looked for the house of Rimbaud in Aden from 1990 to 1996, and found it. He met with the last witnesses of Rimbaud's life, including Emilie Tessier Rimbaud in Vouziers, France; in Ethiopia, he collected oral testimonies. He met many famous Rimbaldians—from Etiemble to Bob Dylan—and collaborated with some of them including Allen Ginsberg, Philippe Soupault, Ernest Pignon Ernest, Hugo Pratt, and Bruno Sermonne.

Borer's translation of Rimbaud, by Enid Starkie (Editions Flammarion, 1981), was a literary and commercial success. In the fall of 1984, two of Borer's books were published simultaneously: Rimbaud en Abyssinie (Rimbaud in Abyssinia), Editions Seuil, collection "Fiction & Cie", and, with Philippe Soupault, Un sieur Rimbaud, se disant négociant (A Mister Rimbaud, Claiming To Be A Trader), Editions Lachenal & Ritter. The latter title won in 1985 the prestigious Bordin Prize of the Académie Française. In 1986, Alain Borer published Adieu à Rimbaud; in 1991 Rimbaud, l’heure de la fuite (Rimbaud, Time of Escape), illustrated by Hugo Pratt.

During these years, Borer developed the notion of the unity of the life and the poetry of Arthur Rimbaud, also after the poet stopped writing poetry. This was subsequently demonstrated in his book Œuvre-vie, Edition du Centenaire (Work-Life, the Centenary Edition), Editions Arléa, 1991, revealing the continuity in Rimbaud's life and work. The book presents “nothing but Rimbaud but all Rimbaud”, chronologically. Both the method and the results were positively received by the majority of critics. The critic, for instance, of the newspaper Le Monde: “A scrupulous reader, an all-knowing biographer, a lively spirit, [Borer's] erudition is effervescent, his pen sharp like a lightning bolt, and similarly to his model, his style is one of no-nonsense. The journeys and the many sites, the poems and the correspondence, are decoded mutually and simultaneously. He obeys straight away to René Char's summons: We must consider Rimbaud only in the perspective of poetry. Is that a scandal? His works and his life show an unrivalled coherence.”

Starting in 1991, Borer started exploring new fields of creativity and new subject matter. Between many other titles, he publishes in 2003 a novel, Koba (Editions Seuil), which will win the Joseph-Kessel Prize in 2003; in 2007, a play, Icare (Editions Seuil), winning the Apollinaire Award in 2008; in 1994, an essay on Joseph Beuys (Catalog of the Centre Pompidou). He continues to write poems, in three different registers (in lyrical cosmic lines, in "pataphysical" books, and in what he calls “noems”).

After a first François Coupé, Borer has made "book-objects", collages, and numerous books in collaboration with artists (for example, on Tuareg jewelry with Kaïdin), which he signs off under the pen name of "Jaseur Boreal". One exhibition of his photographs, La Sanglinière, was presented in the Château de Tours in April 2007.

Art historian and art critic Marc Dachy wrote: "The international success of Rimbaud in Abyssinia (American edition of 1991, translation by Rosmarie Waldrop, at William Morrow, New York) makes us forget that we meet in Borer an author in all manners great, one of the best of his generation. His work, often confidential and dispersed in countless journals, cannot yet be overseen in its totality, but his writing, always incandescent and inspired, signifies with erudition and passion, fantasy and humor, profound progress and innovation".

A travel writer and a signatory of the Littérature-Monde (World-Literature) manifesto of Saint-Malo, Alain Borer undertakes in 2005—at the invitation of Edouard Glissant—a trip in the South Pacific Ocean (from the Gambier Islands to the archipelago of the Tuamotu). It inspired him to the writing of Le ciel & la carte, carnet de voyage dans les mers du Sud à bord de La Boudeuse (The Sky and the Map, the Logbook of a Journey in the South Seas on Board of the Boudeuse [not translated in English]). It received five literary awards: Prix Mac Orlan 2011; Prix Mémoire de la mer 2011; Prix Polynésie 2012; Prix Maurice Genevois de l'Académie française 2012; Joseph Conrad Award.

A major part of his work appears scattered in prefaces, literary essays in journals, in writings about art and artists in catalogues (Pierre Antoniucci, Barry Flanagan, Vivien Isnard, Henri Maccheroni, Volti ...), in poems in books and magazines, and also in radio shows on France Culture (Germain Nouveau, Agenda Dada, Corrida Dada ...). In 1995, he took part in the club "Phares et Balises" of Regis Debray. He participated in the Cahiers de Zanzibar, then in the group Actéon, “hors de commerce”, with André Velter et Zéno Bianu.

From 2014, Borer started getting engaged in the defence of the French language, starting with his essay De quel amour blessée, réflexions sur la langue française (Wounded by Whose Love: Thoughts about the French Language [not translated in English). The book received the Deluen Prize of the Académie Française in 2014, and the François Mauriac Prize of the Aquitaine in 2016; this polemical work led to invitations to numerous conferences and interventions in diverse media.

In 2021, he published a pamphlet against the explosive use of English expressions by French speakers: Speak White (Editions Gallimard, collection "Tracts"). It was well received by conservative media, like Le Figaro, or André Bercoff on Radio Sud, as well as by liberal media, like Le Monde or La Croix (penned by Laurence Cossé). In his column in Sept Info, the novelist Olivier Weber stated: “A bold publication, learned, savant, salutary now that so many languages are in peril, or disintegrate, which comes to the same.” It was critically reviewed in a counter-pamphlet, Les linguistes atterrées.

== Recognition and awards ==
Borer has been awarded the following prizes:

- Prix Bordin de l'Académie française 1985
- Prix Kessel 2003
- Prix Edouard-Glissant 2005 for the ensemble of his œuvre
- Prix Apollinaire 2008
- Prix Mémoires de la mer 2011
- Prix Pierre Mac Orlan 2011
- Prix Maurice Genevoix de l'Académie française 2012
- Prix Polynésie 2012
- Joseph Conrad Award 2012
- Prix François Mauriac 2015
- Grand prix Deluen de l'Académie française 2015

He has also earned a number of other distinctions and honours including:

- President of the International Association of Friends of Rimbaud
- President of the national poetry festival Printemps des Poètes
- President du Grand Robert Ganzo Poetry Award (sponsored by the Fondation de France); founder of the awards Ganzo Discovery, Ganzo Revelation, Ganzo Translator, Ganzo Poetry Translator, and the Orenoco award, special prize of the jury.
- Jury of the Pierre Mac Orlan award
- Jury of the Andrée Chedid award
- Jury of the Nicolas Bouvier award (2007-2010)
- Founder of the Omar Khayyam award at the « Journées du livre et du vin à Saumur (2008-2013) »
- Commander of the Ordre des Arts et des Lettres, 2022

== Literary works ==
Travel Writing
• Le ciel & la carte, carnet de voyage dans les mers du Sud à bord de La Boudeuse, Editions Seuil, 2010 [Prix Pierre Mac Orlan 2011, Prix Mémoires de la mer 2011, Prix Polynésie 2012, Joseph Conrad Award 2012, Prix Genevois de l'Académie française 2012]
• Carnets de Sarajevo, Editions Gallimard, 2002
• Drames tranquilles à Tabou, Editions Michalon, 1995
• Trois jours aux anges, Phébus, 1989 • Souvenirs d'un chauffeur de maître, Les Temps modernes, 1978

Novel
• Koba, Éditions Seuil, « Fiction & Cie », 2002, [Prix Joseph Kessel 2003]

Theater
• Icare & I don't, Editions Seuil, 2007, [Prix Apollinaire 2008]
• Le Chant du Rien visible, Paris, Fourbis, 1991
• Richard Mille, Le Cercle d'Art, 2005
• Paul des oiseaux, with alugraphies by Pierre Anoniucci, Tours, CCC/Metz, Editions Voix, 1985

Essays on Rimbaud
• Rimbaud en Abyssinie, Editions Seuil, "Fictions & Cie", 1984, 1991, "Points", 2004, 2013, 2021
• Rimbaud, l’heure de la fuite, generic by Hugo Pratt, Editions Gallimard, 1991, 2001
• Arthur Rimbaud, le lieu et la formule, Editions Mercure de France, 1999
• Arthur Rimbaud, Œuvre-vie, Edition du centenaire (dir.), Editions Arléa, 1991
• Je me ressouviens, Institut du Monde Arabe, Comédie française, FNAC, 1991
• « Nothing de Rimbe », Ernest Pignon-Ernest, Editions Area, 1986, reprintes as La Nuée bleue, 1991
• Rimbaud d'Arabie, Editions Seuil, "Fiction & Cie", 1991
• Un sieur Rimbaud, se disant négociant, avec Philippe Soupault, Editions Lachenal & Ritter, 1984, [Prix Bordin de l'Académie française 1985]; reprinted with a new title Terre et les pierres, Le Livre de Poche, Hachette, 1989
• Rimbaud, by Enid Starkie, translation, preface and notes by Alain Borer, Editions Flammarion, 1982, reprinted in 1989
• Rimbaud multiple (dir.) seminar of Cerisy, Gourdon, Dominique Bedou et Jean Touzot publishers, 1986
• Bérénice, spécial Rimbaud, Rome, 1980
• Bouts rimés d'Arthur Rimbaud, Muro Torto, Rome, Villa Medicis, 1980

Essays on Art
• Christian Jaccard, l'Art en fusion, catalogue exposition Christian Jaccard, une collection, Musée Fabre, Montpellier, 2023
• Villeglé l'anarchiviste, Editions Gallimard, 2020
• Martin Muller or the Talking Picture, Arkansas Art Center, 2017
• Chambord, Monum, 2006
• Hugo Pratt - Ethiopie, la trace du scorpion, Casterman, 2005
• La coupabilité de Saint Martin : La légende de saint Martin au XIXe, Peintures et dessins, Paris et Tours, Somogy Editions d'art, Musée des Beaux-Arts de Tours, 1997
• Le rêve du Chacmol, essai sur Olivier Seguin, Société d'édition du Val de Loire, 1995
• Déploration de Joseph Beuys, éditions du Centre Pompidou, Paris, 1994; Bibliothèque des arts, Lausanne, 2001; expanded reissue by Editions L'Atelier contemporain, 2021
• Albrecht Dürer, L'Oeuvre graphique, H.& Bouret, 1980; reissued by Booking International, 1994
• Aleph ou le bœuf sous la langue, essai sur Georges Badin, Shakespeare & Cie, Paris, 1976
• Dürer, Le Burin du graveur, Editions Hubschmidt & Bouret, 1974; reprinted by Editions Booking International, 1994; expanded reissue by Editions L'Atelier contemporain, 2021
• Le Reste à voir. Essais sur l'art contemporain, in press at Editions L'Atelier contemporain

Essays on the French Language • "Speak white!", pourquoi renoncer au bonheur de parler français? Editions "Tract" Gallimard, 2021
• De quel amour blessée, réflexions sur la langue française, Gallimard, 2014, [prix François Mauriac 2015, grand prix Deluen de l'Académie française 2015
• Sauve qui peut la langue française : Défense et illustration de la langue française au-jourd'hui, Editions Gallimard, 2013

Literary essays
• L’ennemitié, dans "L’Armistice", Gallimard, 2018
• Traité du noème, États Provisoires du Poème XI, TNP/Cheyne, 2010.

Poetry
• L'Etre à gué, forthcoming
• "Atelier Poésie", atelier animé par Alain Borer, Editions Gallimard, les ateliers de la nrf, 2024
• Tout tombe, Dumerchez, 2023, cover design by Pierre Antoniucci and Valère Novarina
• L'Ange d'être ici, noèmes dits et vus, leporello, Crac, Genève, 2023
• Connaissements, vélopoème et leporello, Crac, Genève, 2022
• Le jet d'eau, variations, Crac, Genève, 2021
• Rien n'est loin, noèmes dits et vus, leporello, Crac, Genève 2020
• Les heures inconnues, noèmes dits et vus, leporello, Crac, Genève, 2019
• Ecritures du ciel, noèmes dits et vus, leporello, Crac, Genève, 2018
• Epactes, drawing by Marie-Dominique Kessler, Crac, Genève, 2018
• Séléniques, drawing by Marie-Dominique Kessler, Crac, Genève, 2017
• Départs de feu, drawing by Marie-Dominique Kessler, Le Livre Pauvre, Tours, 2012
• Terres assourdies, gouaches de Jacques Vimard, 2007
• Loups plats, illustrations by Pierre Antoniucci, Georges Badin, Peter Briggs, Alain Gauvin, Christian Jaccard, Jacques Vimard, Pierre Zanzucchi, Ed. Rencontre, 2006
• Analectes, bijoux tuaregs de Kaïdin, 2005-2007
• Carte mère, noèmes, Vice-versa, 2002
• Jeil, noèmes, interventions by Pierre Zanzucchi, L’Échelle, Hôtel Beury, 2000; reissue Rencontre, 2002
• Pour l'amour du ciel, CD Radio France, 1997
• Le livre de repousser Apopis, noèmes, frontispiece by Pierre Antoniucci, Ed. La Main Courante, 1995
• Epactes, noèmes, gouaches by Jacques Vimard, Biren, 1995
• Départs arrêtés, water colors by Jean-Claude Vignes, Aréa, 1995
• Les Très Riches Heures de Chuck Berry, photomontages de Joël Hubaut, Éditions de la C.R.E.M., 1991
• Zone bleue, La Chevelure de Bérénice; Le Nuage de Magellan, extrait III, drawing by Barbara Thaden, Ed. Lachenal & Ritter, 1984
• Le Nuage de Magellan, I, gouaches by Georges Badin, Musée d'art moderne de Céret, 1980; Le Nuage de Magellan, II, collage by Peter Briggs, Bruxelles, Bibliothèque Phantomas, 1983
• Le métier à citer, Ecbolade, Béthune, 1976; complete original at Modernism, San Francisco, device by Christian Jaccard, Modernism, s.d.
• Venusberg, preceded by a dream of Michel Butor, cover design by Jean-Luc Parant, lino by Alain Gauvin, Béthune, Ecbolade 1976; reissued in 1983, drawings by Vivien Isnard
• Alexandrins oraux, fortuits et privés, Ed. Encres vives, 1975; expanded reissue with lithography by Erro, Graphium, Montpellier, 1980
• Bestiaire, La Louvière (Belgique), Daily-Bul, coll. «Les Poquettes volantes», 1979
• François Coupé, SAFC-Encres Vives, 1973
• Tous les copeaux de la pirogue, Génération / A telle enseigne, 1972
• fi, Parisod, Lausanne, preface by Michel Vachey, 1971
• Fables à pontes de cuivre, Encres Vives, 1970
• Hé, dites!, le Plateau, 1969, and supplement of Encres Vives, 1970

Anthologies
• Partances, petite anthologie de voyage, Aéroport de Paris, 2001
• Phantomas 152-157, "France", Bruxelles, juin 1978

Works translated in English • Rimbaud in Abyssinia, William Morrow and Company, New York, 1991 (Translation by Rosmarie Waldrop) ISBN 978-0-688-07594-1
• The Essential Joseph Beuys, The MIT Press, Cambridge, Massachusetts, 1997 ISBN 978-0-262-02431-0
• Dürer, The Engraver's Burin, forthcoming (Translation by Jan Laurens Siesling)

Audio-visual
• Pour l'amour du ciel, CD 'Les Poétiques de France-Culture', Radio France, 1996
• "Rimbaud d'Orange" : de Charleville à Java, Jean Degives et Frans Suasso, Hilversum, International Radio of the Netherlands, 1991
• L'Heure de la fuite, conférence d'Aden, Paris, Les Productions de La Lanterne, 1990
• Sur les terrasses de Rimbaud, film by Saad Salman, Paris, Les Productions de La Lanterne, 1990
• Le Voleur de feu, television film, directed by Charles Brabant, with Léo Ferré, TF1, 1978, 1986; CD Premium, 2011
• Arthur Rimbaud, presented by Alain Borer. Rimbaud texts read by Laurent Terzieff, audio cassettes Radio France, 1978 et 1989
• Paul Verlaine, presented by Alain Borer. Audio cassettes Radio France, 1979

== Exhibitions ==
• La Beauté, calendar, 2014
• Les Mâts à mots, (Rabelais de Seuilly à La Devinière), 2013
• La Sanglinière, photographies, Château de Tours, 2007, Geneva, Andata. Ritorno, 2013
• Le Reste à voir, L’Échelle, Hôtel Beury, 2006
• Six peintres, six portes, Paris, 121 rue de l’Ouest, May–June, 1983
