= Yannick Haenel =

French writer

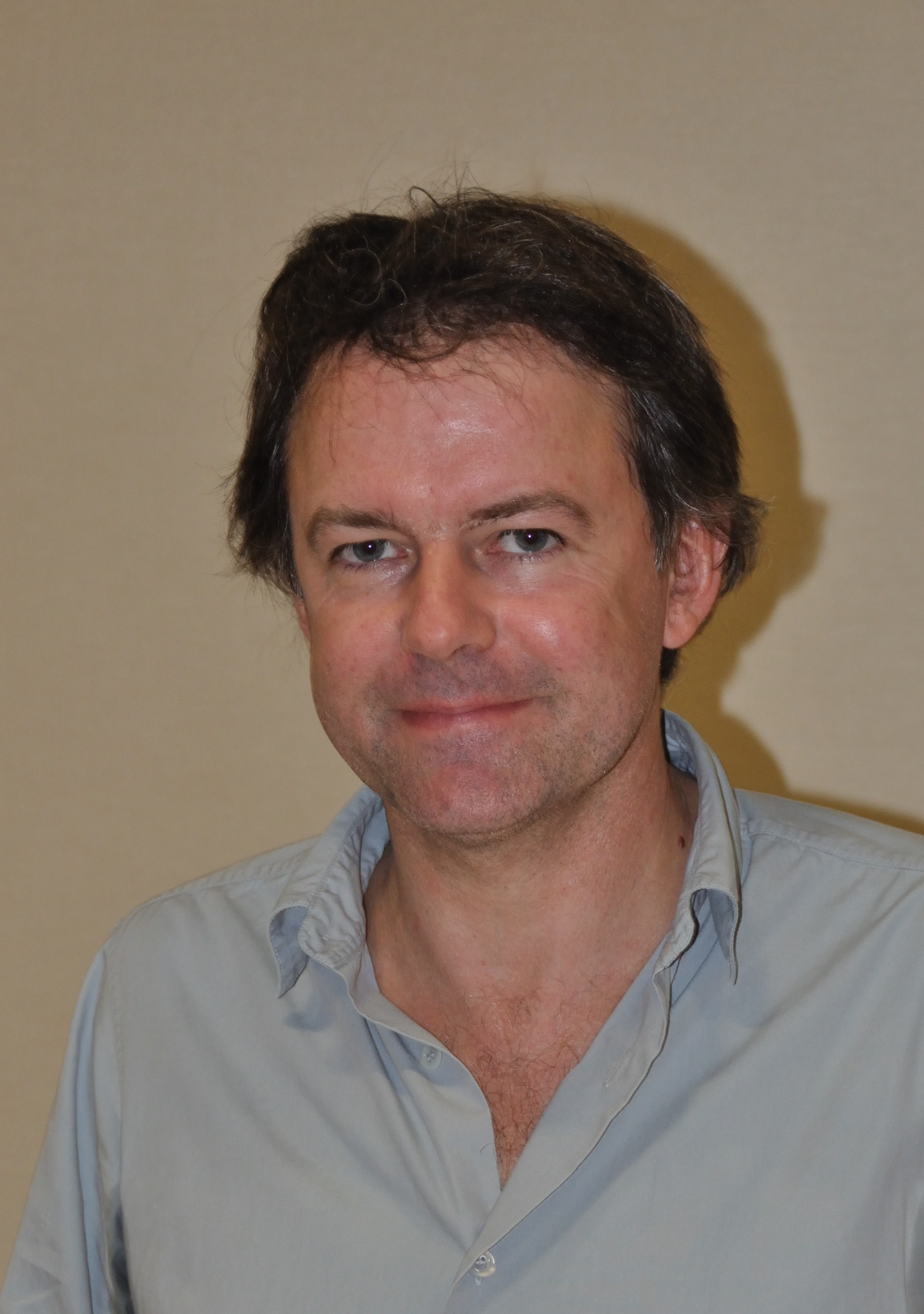
Yannick Haenel

Yannick Haenel (born 1967, Rennes) is a French writer, cofounder of the literary magazine Ligne de risque.

== Biography ==
The son of a soldier, Yannick Haenel studied at the Prytanée National Militaire at La Flèche.

From 1997, he codirected the magazine Ligne de risque with François Meyronnis. Until 2005 he was a teacher of French at lycée La Bruyère in Versailles.

He published several novels, including Introduction à la mort française and Évoluer parmi les avalanches, as well as an essay about the tapestries of The Lady and the Unicorn: À mon seul désir.

He also directed two volumes of interviews with Philippe Sollers: Ligne de risque and Poker.

In 2007, he published Cercle (Éditions Gallimard), a novel which earned him the prix Décembre and the prix Roger Nimier.

In 2007, a controversy arose with Alina Reyes who accused him of plagiarism.

In 2008-2009, Haenel was a resident at the French Academy in Rome, the Villa Médicis.

In 2009, he was awarded the Prix Interallié and the Prix du roman Fnac for Jan Karski.This book has three parts:

1. The first part is directly inspired by the film Shoah by Claude Lanzmann, where the Polish resistant Karski is interviewed.
2. The second part summarizes in approximately 80 pages the testimony of Karski published in English in 1944 under the title Story of a secret state.
3. The third part depicts Karski's feelings and relates dialogues that are presented by the author as a fiction.

Claude Lanzmann published a vigorous criticism of the novel of which he described the third part as a "falsification of history". He reproached Haenel for having plagiarized the dialogues of his film without having asked for authorization. Philippe Sollers, the director of Gallimard's collection L'Infini, said that he submitted Lanzmann the prints of the novel before publication which Lanzmann has always denied. Haenel responded by claiming the freedom of the novelist

Yannick Haenel is a columnist for the literary and film magazine Transfuge since 2010 and Charlie Hebdo since the resumption of publication after the January 2015 attacks.

== Work ==
=== Novels ===
- 1996: Les Petits Soldats, La Table ronde
- 2001: Introduction à la mort française, Gallimard, series "L'Infini"
- 2003: Évoluer parmi les avalanches, Gallimard, series "L'Infini"
- 2007: Cercle, Gallimard, series "L'Infini", ISBN 207077600X, Prix Décembre 2007, prix Roger Nimier 2008.
- 2009: Jan Karski, Gallimard, series "L'Infini", 2009 ISBN 978-2-07-012311-7, Prix du roman Fnac and Prix Interallié.
- 2013: Les Renards pâles, Gallimard, series "L'Infini" ISBN 978-2-07-014217-0
- 2017 Tiens ferme ta couronne, Gallimard, series "L'Infini" ISBN 9782070177875 - Prix Médicis of 2017

=== Fictions ===
- 2005: À mon seul désir, éditions Argol
- 2011: Le Sens du calme, Mercure de France, series "Traits et portraits"
- 2015: Je cherche l'Italie, Gallimard, series "L'Infini"

=== Essay ===
- 2009: Prélude à la délivrance, with François Meyronnis, Gallimard, series "L'Infini"

=== Interviews ===
- 2005: Ligne de risque, under the direction of Yannick Haenel and François Meyronnis, Gallimard, series "L'Infini"
- 2005: Poker, entretiens de la revue Ligne de risque with Philippe Sollers, Gallimard, series "L'Infini"

== Honours ==
- 2010 Chevalier of the Ordre des Arts et des Lettres
- 2012 Chevalier of the Order of Merit of the Republic of Poland
- 2017 Prix Médicis for Tiens ferme ta couronne
