= François Meyronnis =

French writer (born 1961)

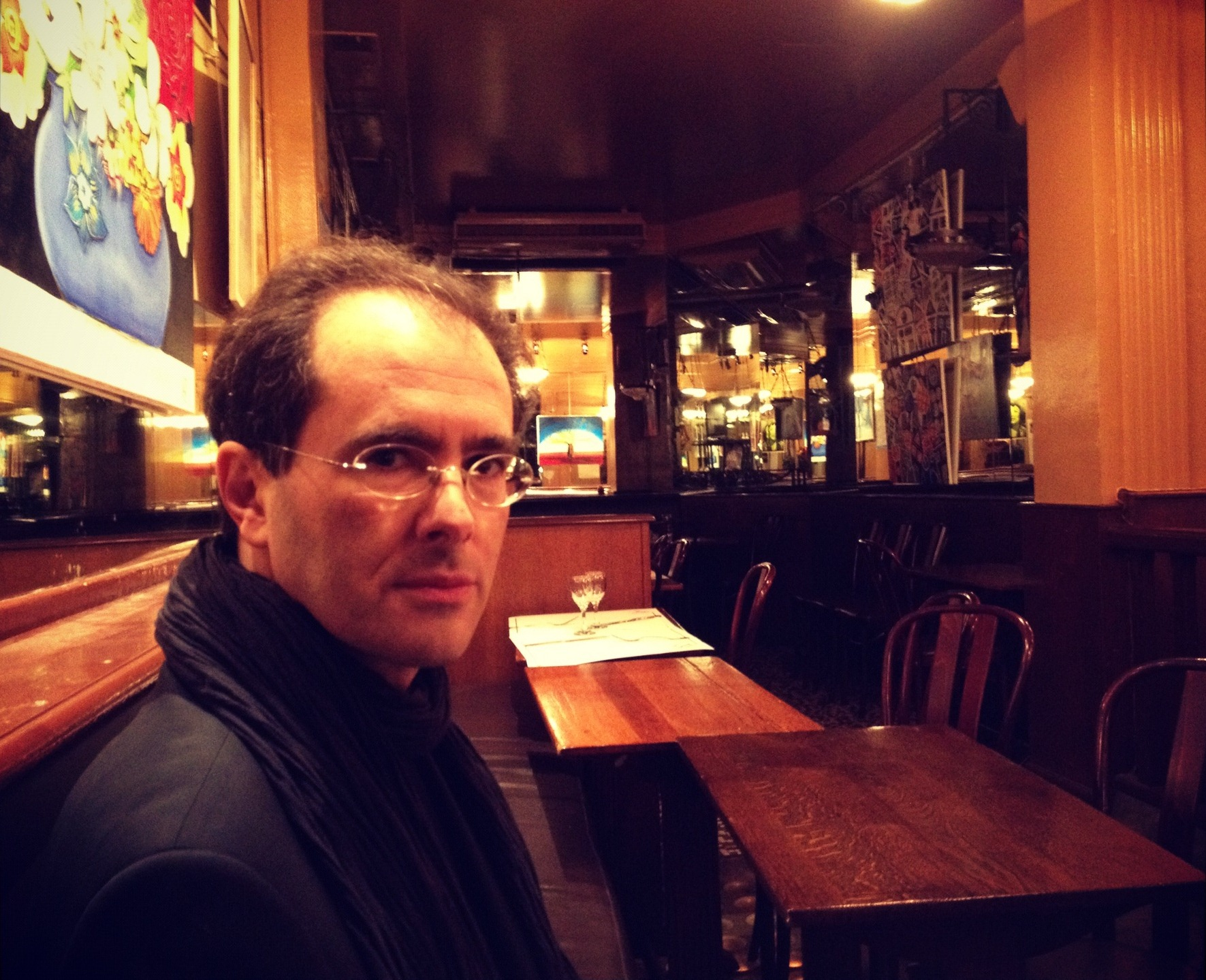
FrançoisMeyronnis

François Meyronnis (born 22 December 1961) is a French writer.

Meyronnis was born in Paris. In 1997, along with Yannick Haenel and Frédéric Badré, he founded Ligne de risque (Line of risk), a literary magazine. He published his first novel Ma tête en liberté (My mind in freedom) in 2000. During the following years Meyronnis published a number of essays, including L'Axe du Néant (The Axis of Nothingness) which could be considered as the most notable of these and De l'extermination considérée comme un des beaux-arts (On extermination considered as one of the Fine Arts) in 2007. In 2005 was released Poker a series of conversations between Ligne de risque and the French romancier Philippe Sollers. The same year, the book Collectif Ligne de risque was published, containing a large number of past interviews. Amongst which, conversations with the French sinologist François Jullien or heideggerian and conférencier Gérard Guest. In 2009 Yannick Haenel and François Meyronnis published Prélude à la délivrance (Prelude to deliverance) gathering numerous conversations and essays about Varlam Shalamov, Paul Celan and the topic of resurrection in the novel Moby Dick.
