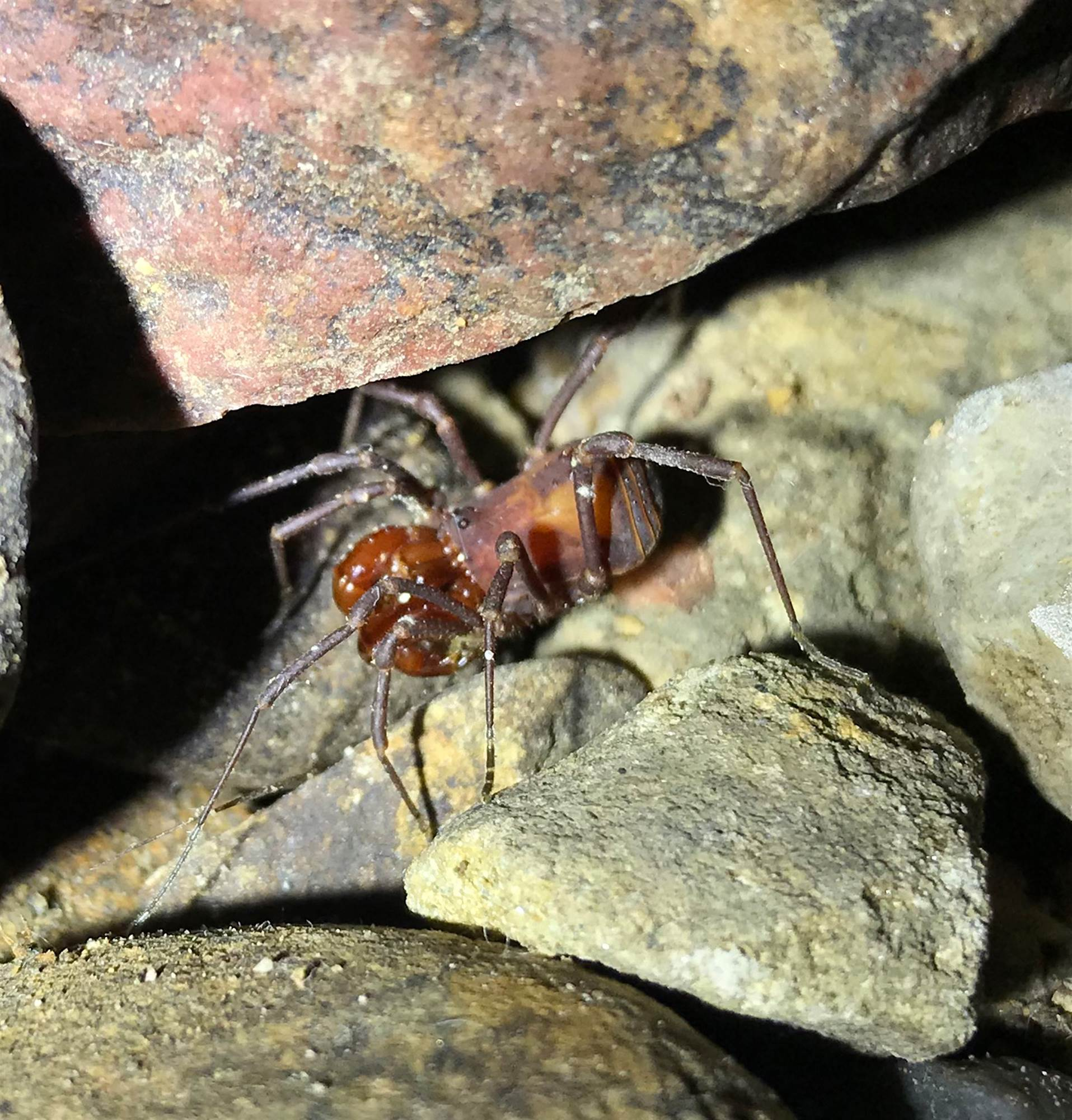
- At Marakoopa Cave, Mole Creek Karst National Park

Scientific classification
- Kingdom: Animalia
- Phylum: Arthropoda
- Subphylum: Chelicerata
- Class: Arachnida
- Order: Opiliones
- Family: Triaenonychidae
- Genus: Hickmanoxyomma
- Species: H. gibbergunyar

Binomial name
- Hickmanoxyomma gibbergunyar Hunt, 1990
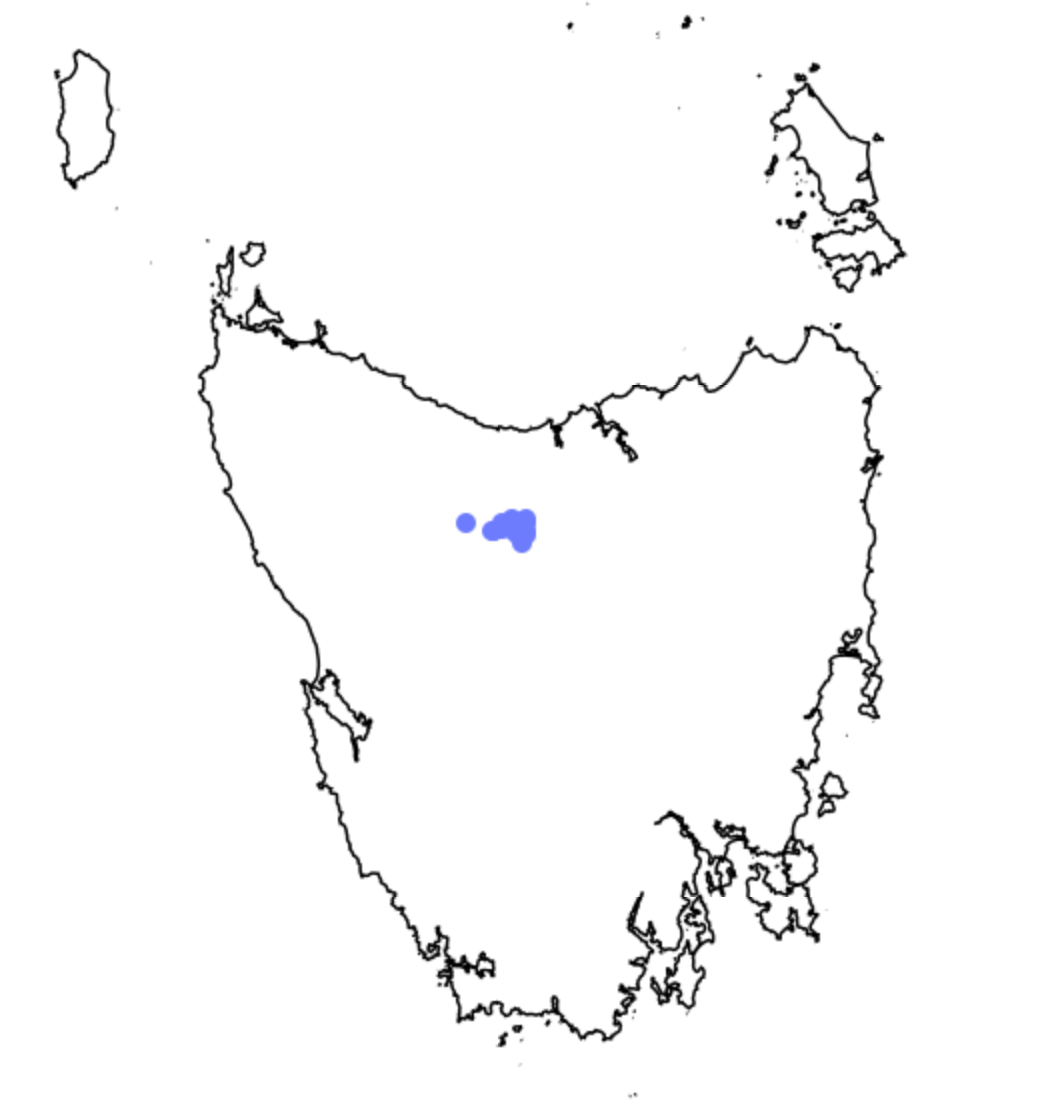
- Distribution of Hickmanoxyomma gibbergunyar

= Hickmanoxyomma gibbergunyar =

Species of arachnid

Hickmanoxyomma gibbergunyar, commonly known as the Mole Creek Cave harvestman, is a rare species of harvestman endemic to the Mole Creek karst system in Tasmania, Australia.

The species name gibbergunyar is reportedly derived from the Australian Aboriginal word "gibber-gunyar", which means "a cave dwelling".

== Taxonomy and phylogeny ==
H. gibbergunyar was first described by arachnologist Glenn Hunt in 1990. The species belongs to the genus Hickmanoxyomma, of the harvestman family Triaenonychidae. Triaenonychidae represents an ancient Gondwanan lineage that diversified approximately 200 million years ago, prior to the breakup of the supercontinent Gondwana. As a result, members of this family are largely restricted to temperate regions of former Gondwanan landmasses in the Southern Hemisphere. The genus Hickmanoxyomma is endemic to Tasmania and currently comprises seven described species, six of which are cave-dwelling. Hickmanoxyomma are the most widely distributed harvestmen in Tasmania's caves.

Speciation within Hickmanoxyomma was likely facilitated by climatic changes during the Pleistocene, when glacial conditions are thought to have caused the extinction of surface-dwelling ancestors, isolating surviving populations within caves. Many cave fauna are descended from hygrophilic soil- and litter-dwelling ancestors, pre-adapting them to the cool, wet, conditions of caves.

Within the genus, H. gibbergunyar is most closely related to Hickmanoxyomma tasmanicum, with the two forming the tasmanicum species group. The two species can be distinguished by the size of the tubercles (bumps) along the posterior margin of the scute and the free tergites; H. tasmanicum possesses large, rounded tubercles in this region, whereas H. gibbergunyar has much smaller bumps or fine granules.

== Description ==
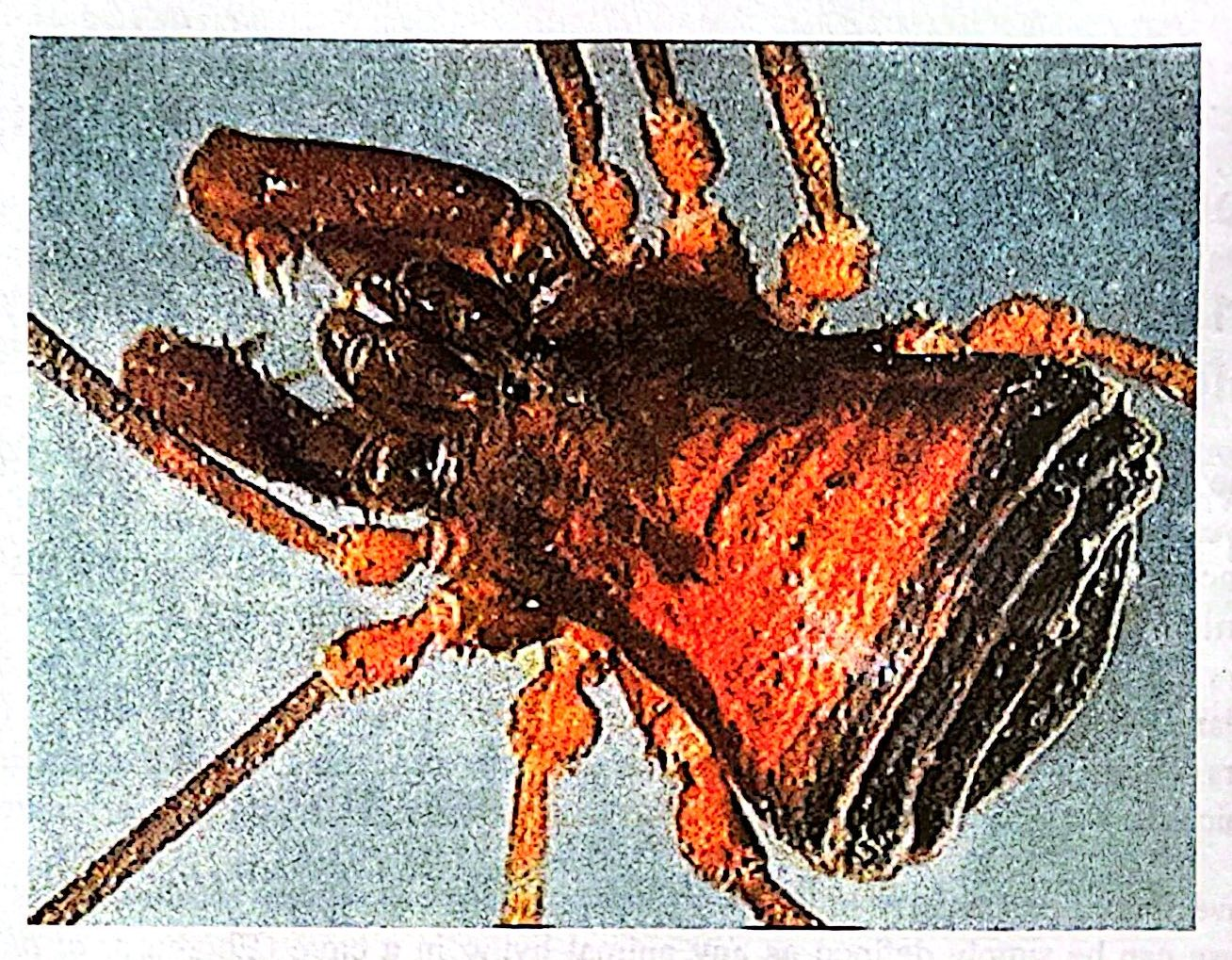
Dorsal view

The body of H. gibbergunyar ranges from 5–7 mm (0.20–0.28 in) in length, and is light brown with darker brown patterning. IT has elongated legs that are more than three times the length of the body. It has a low, oval body with a prominent eye mound bearing a small upward-projecting spine, a feature that distinguishes Hickmanoxyomma from a similar genus, Odontonuncia.

The jaws (chelicerae) are small but armed with a large spine and several smaller dorsal spines, and the short "pincer‑like" appendages (pedipalps) beside the mouth are fairly strong and spiny, helping it to grip prey or detritus.

Females are similar to the males, but have a smaller body, with shorter, narrower pedipalps that have thinner, less developed spines.

== Habitat and distribution ==
=== Distribution ===
Hickmanoxyomma gibbergunyar is only found in the Mole Creek karst system of central northern Tasmania, where it is widespread and seldom common in any given cave, though occasionally locally abundant.

This species has been recorded in at least 10 caves within this karst system, including:

- Anastomosis
- Baldocks Cave
- Cow Cave-Pyramid Link
- Cyclops Cave
- Georgies Hall
- Herberts Pot
- Honeycomb Cave
- Kubla Khan Cave
- Westmorland Cave
- Wet Cave
- Wombat Cave

However, it is likely to be more widespread than currently known. As of 2005, there is no evidence that the distribution of this species has recently declined.

=== Habitat ===
H. gibbergunyar lives on the floors, ceilings and walls of these caves, in both dark and transition zones. It is often observed near glowworms.

== Cave adaptations ==
H. gibbergunyar is a troglobite, meaning it lives exclusively within dark, underground habitats such as caves. Species of the Hickmanoxyomma genus, including H. gibbergunyar, exhibit several morphological adaptations to cave environments, including depigmentation, and reduced eye size associated with the absence of light. Other adaptations include reduced lateral branches on the claws of legs III and IV, and elongation of pedipalps and legs.

The second pair of legs is particularly elongated, a trait also seen in Hickmanoxyomma cavaticum and other cavernicolous harvestmen species. These legs contain a high concentration of sensory structures and function as "feelers", enabling individuals to detect vibrations and prey and compensate for reduced eyesight. All legs of H. gibbergunyar are elongated, which may improve locomotion across uneven cave terrain.

== Ecology ==
H. gibbergunyar is one of 195 species found in the 509 known caves of the Mole Creek karst area; this high species diversity partially reflects the intensity of study in Mole Creek relative to other karst systems. As an invertebrate within a Tasmanian cave community, H. gibbergunyar lives in a low-nutrient environment that relies on both natural organic input from the surface and the recycling of nutrients within the karst ecosystem. This relative lack of nutrients means that abundance and biomass of Tasmanian cave fauna tends to be low, even if diversity is high.

=== Diet ===
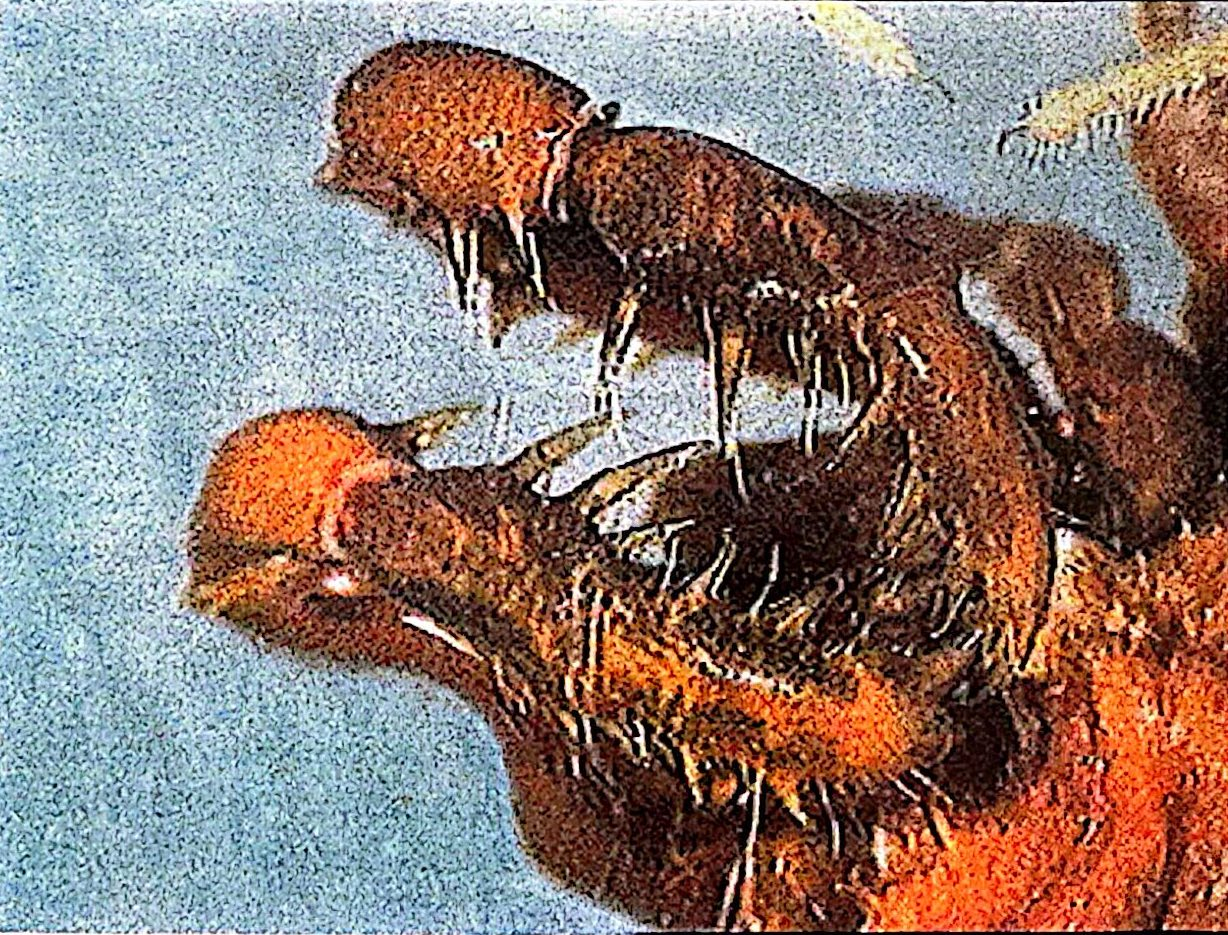
Ventral view of the chelicera and pedipalps

Aside from the Tasmanian cave spider (Hickmania troglodytes), harvestmen such as H. gibbergunyar act as the top predator within the Mole Creek Karst system, feeding on invertebrates like crickets (eg. Micropathus cavernicola, Parvotettix goede), beetles (eg. Tasmanotrechus cockerilli) , and potentially glow worms. They search for prey using their long legs and sensory organs, before ambushing them using their thorny, highly armoured chelicerae and pedipalps (pictured right).

They may also scavenge on detritus, such as epigean animals, rotting vegetation, and other organic matter washed in through creeks and streams, as well as faeces and carcasses.

=== Predation ===
Direct predators of H. gibbergunyar have not been documented, but may include Hickmania troglodytes (Tasmanian Cave Spider), or opportunistic cave visitors such as lizards, snakes, possums and Tasmanian devils.

=== Life history and reproduction ===
The life history of H. gibbergunyar, and the Hickmanoxyomma genus more broadly, is largely unknown. No specific data exists on its life cycle, reproduction, development time, longevity, or breeding habits in published sources. H. gibbergunyar likely reproduces sexually, as indicated by detailed descriptions of male genitalia and sexual dimorphism.

== Threats and conservation ==
H. gibbergunyar is listed as 'Rare' under the Tasmanian Threatened Species Protection Act 1995, and was deemed secure following its last assessment in 2005. However, individual cave populations may become threatened, because many are situated on private property, where land practices may threaten individual habitats.

Potential threats to H. gibbergunyar populations include land clearing, quarrying and changes to drainage, water, and nutrient levels due to agricultural practices. Cave users may represent a threat to this species through trampling; both of individual harvestmen, and of their habitat.
