= Hickmanoxyomma =

Scientific classification
- Kingdom: Animalia
- Phylum: Arthropoda
- Subphylum: Chelicerata
- Class: Arachnida
- Order: Opiliones
- Family: Triaenonychidae
- Subfamily: Triaenonychinae
- Genus: Hickmanoxyomma; Hunt, 1990

Genus of harvestmen

Hickmanoxyomma is a genus of harvestmen in the family Triaenonychidae.

== Species ==
Hickmanoxyomma contains the following species:

- Hickmanoxyomma cavaticum (Hickman, 1958)
- Hickmanoxyomma clarkei G. S. Hunt, 1990
- Hickmanoxyomma cristatum G. S. Hunt, 1990
- Hickmanoxyomma eberhardi G. S. Hunt, 1990
- Hickmanoxyomma gibbergunyar G. S. Hunt, 1990
- Hickmanoxyomma goedei G. S. Hunt, 1990
- Hickmanoxyomma tasmanicum (Roewer, 1915)
