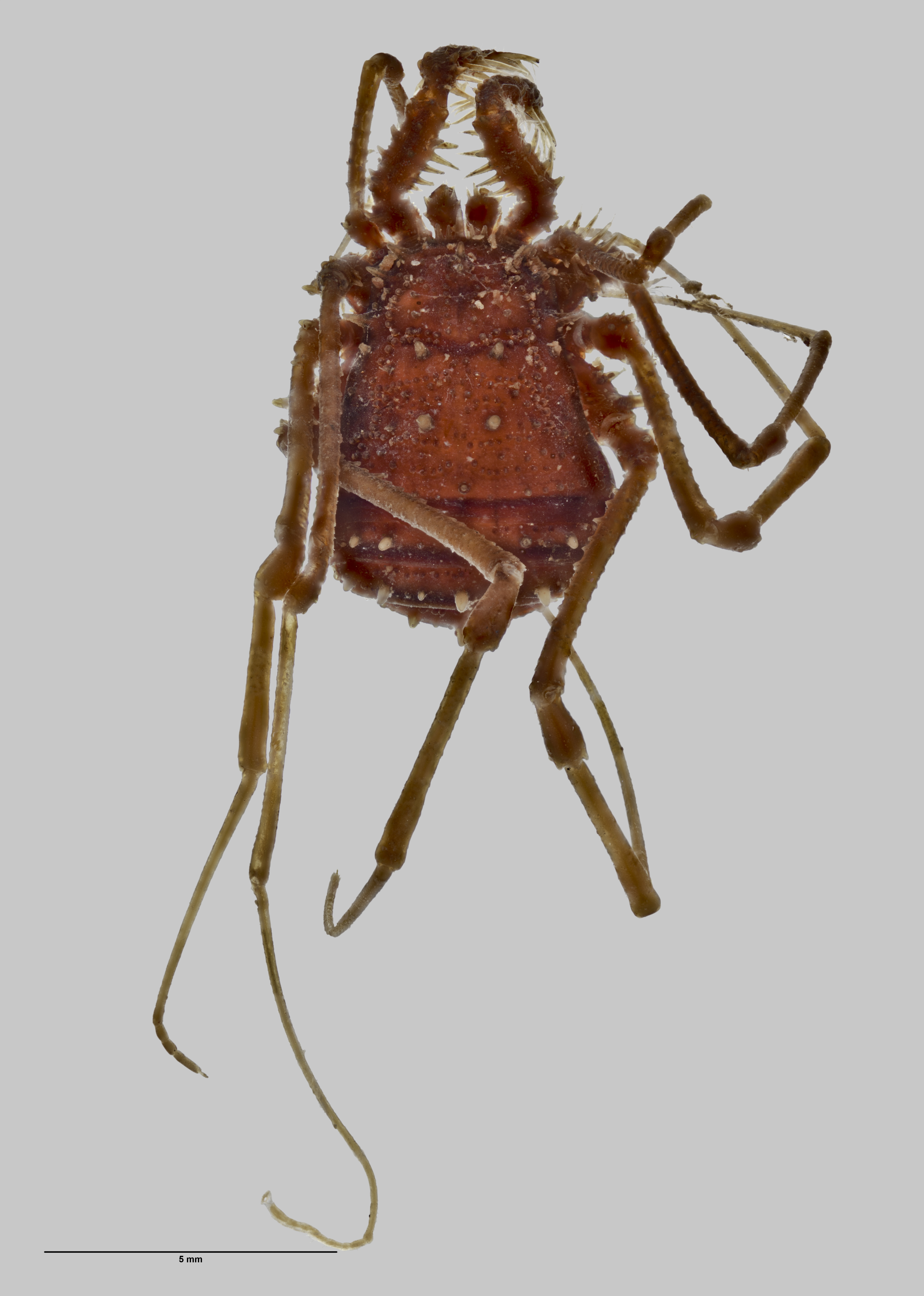
- Holotype (dorsal view)

Scientific classification
- Kingdom: Animalia
- Phylum: Arthropoda
- Subphylum: Chelicerata
- Class: Arachnida
- Order: Opiliones
- Family: Triaenonychidae
- Subfamily: Triaenonychinae
- Genus: Triregia
- Species: T. monstrosa

Binomial name
- Triregia monstrosa Forster, 1948

= Triregia monstrosa =

Genus of arachnids

Triregia monstrosa is a species of harvestmen (Opiliones) in the family Triaenonychidae. The species is endemic to New Zealand, found only on Manawatāwhi / Three Kings Islands.

== Description ==
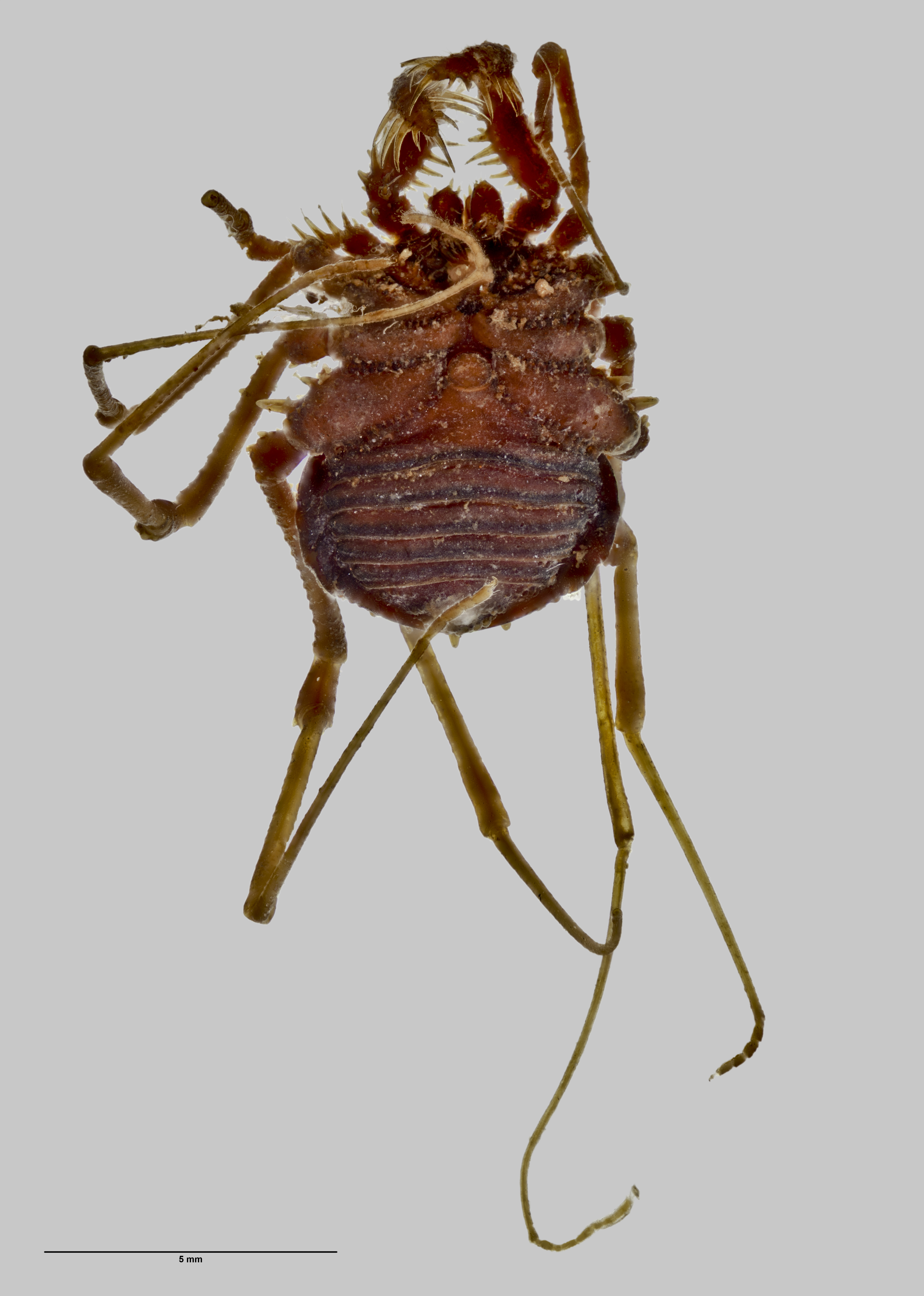
Holotype (ventral view)

In the original description, Forster described the body of species as below:

Body: Entire dorsal surface with small papillae placed in a nearly regular pattern. Eye mound bluntly conical, separated by its diameter from the anterior margin of the cephalothorax, armed along the median line with two strong, erect, blunt spines; one rising anterior to, and one posterior to, the eyes. Eyes placed on outer side of eye mound and directed laterally. Anterior margin of cephalothorax with strong transverse ridge along which are nine spines. Median large, flanked by two small, and a further two large, spines on each side. The row of spines is extended immediately behind ridge by further large spine on each side. There is a further small spine at each anterior corner. On each posterior corner of the cephalothorax is a single large laterally directed spine. Areas I-V distinguished by definite transverse grooves which reach two-thirds across on each side to a pronounced longitudinal groove, which cuts off an unsegmented lateral margin. Lateral margin with two small spines, one at one-seventh, the other at one-third down.

T. monstrosa can be differentiated from other members of Triregia due to a lack of spinous tubercles on the posterior margin of scute or Tergal Area 4.

== Taxonomy ==
The species was described by Ray Forster in 1948, as the type species of the genus Triregia, which he described in the same paper. The holotype, collected on 6 May 1946 by Graham Turbott from Manawatāwhi / Great Island in Manawatāwhi / Three Kings Islands, is held by the Auckland War Memorial Museum.

== Distribution ==
The species is endemic to Manawatāwhi / Three Kings Islands in New Zealand.
