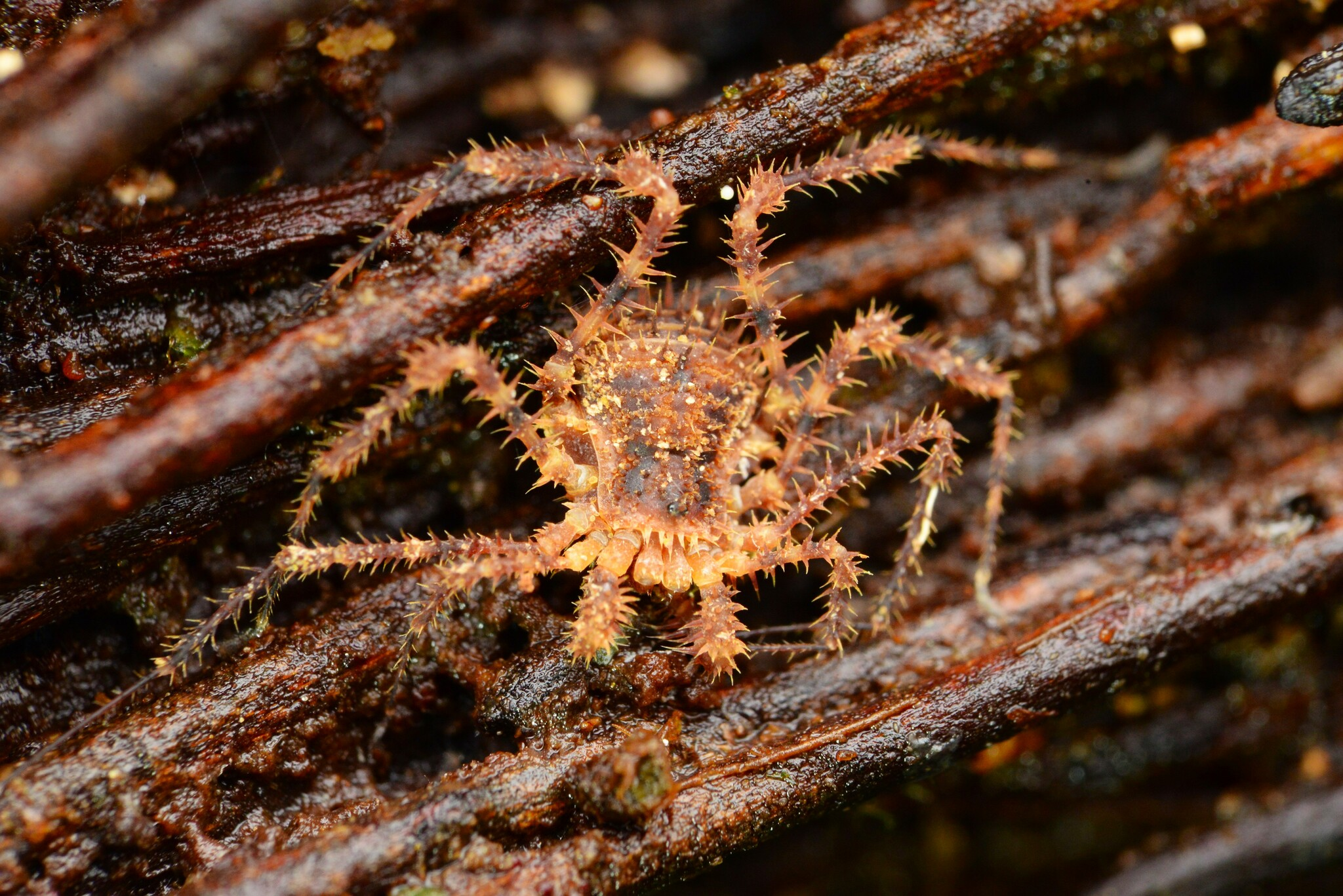
- Triregia fairburni

Scientific classification
- Kingdom: Animalia
- Phylum: Arthropoda
- Subphylum: Chelicerata
- Class: Arachnida
- Order: Opiliones
- Superfamily: Triaenonychioidea
- Family: Triaenonychidae
- Subfamily: Triaenonychinae
- Genus: Triregia; Forster, 1948

Type species
- Triregia monstrosa

= Triregia =

Genus of arachnids

Triregia is a genus of harvestmen (Opiliones) in the family Triaenonychidae. The genus is endemic to New Zealand.

== Description ==
In the original description, Forster described the genus as below:

Eye mound removed from the anterior margin of cephalothorax by nearly its own diameter, with one anterior-median and one posterior-median large erect and blunt spine. Tergites 1-V fused, areas distinguished by transverse grooves which do not reach the sides. Area II and area IV each with median pair strong spines. Anterior margin of cephalothorax strongly armed with forwardly projecting spines. Area V and free tergites I-III each with transverse row of strong spines. Sternites smooth. Sternum narrowly triangular. Chelicerae small, weak, covered with a number of setose tubercles. Pedipalps strong, as long as body, armed below with strong spines. Coxa I below with numerous spines. Coxae II-IV below with low tubercles. Tarsal segments 3, 7-8, 4, 4. Distitarsal segments of legs I and II: 2, 3. Side branches on claws of legs III and IV very small, branching from halfway. Spiracle opening hidden.

T. bilineata can be identified due to a pair of small spinous tubercles on Tergal Area 4 and the posterior margin of scute, which T. monstrosa does not have. T. fairburni has a single median pair of tubercles in Areas 1-4, and an antero-median surface of carapace with five spines. The subspecies T. fairburni grata has four spinous tubercles in each of the areas 1-4, and seven spines on its carapace antero-median surface.

== Taxonomy ==
The genus was described by Ray Forster in 1948, who named T. monstrosa (also described in the paper) as the type species. In 2020, phylogenetic analysis indicated that the genus is paraphyletic, with two harvestmen genera from New Caledonia, Triconobunus and Diaenobunus showing a close relationship with different species within Triregia. The authors of the study suggested a more thorough analysis of Triregia and related genera would need to be undertaken to clarify the taxonomic relationships between the different species.

== Distribution ==
The genus is endemic to New Zealand, found on the upper North Island, and on Manawatāwhi / Three Kings Islands.

== Species ==
Species within the genus Triregia include:

- Triregia bilineata (Forster, 1943)
- Triregia fairburni (Forster, 1943)
- Triregia monstrosa Forster, 1948

== Gallery ==
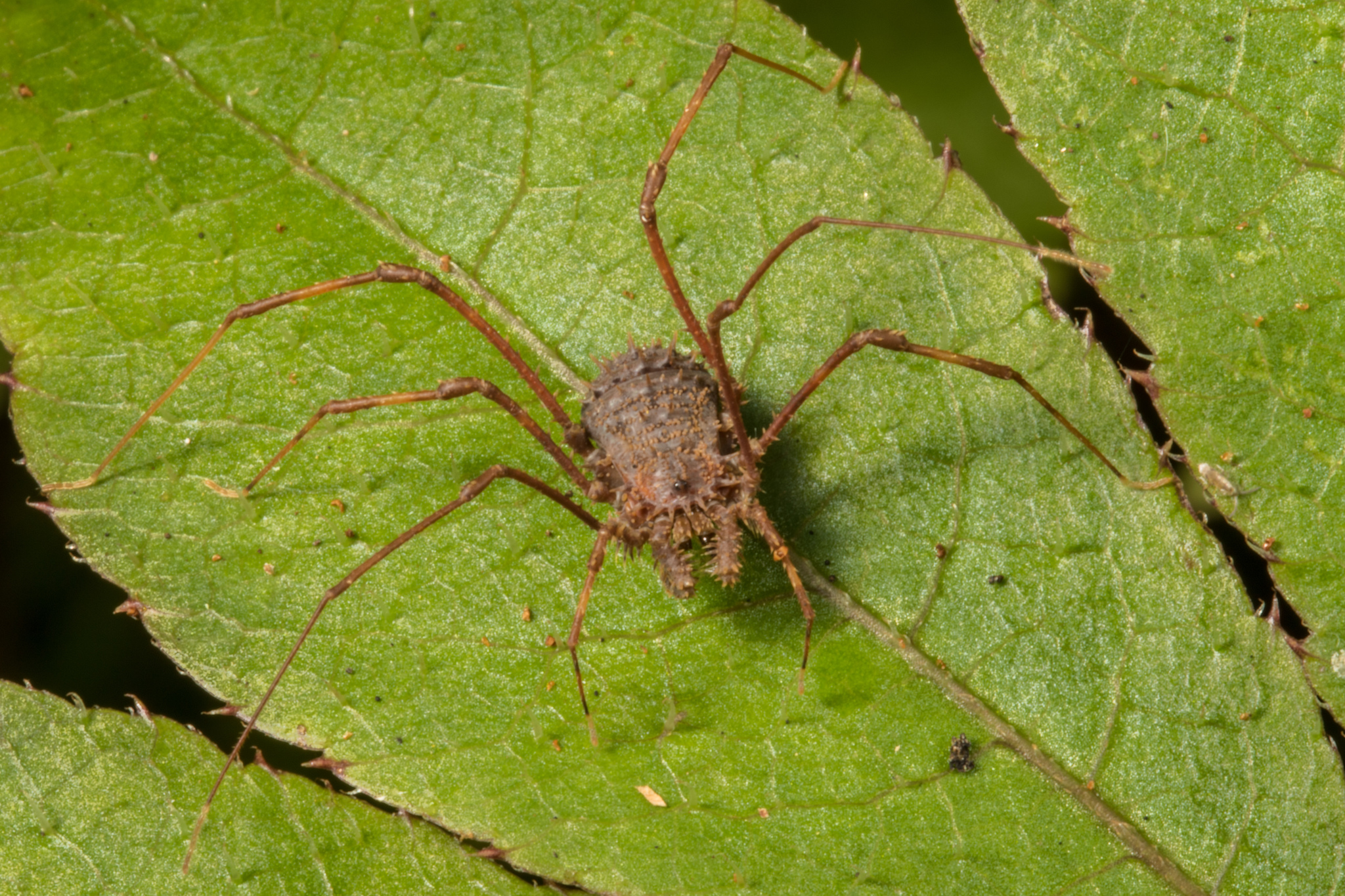
Triregia bilineata

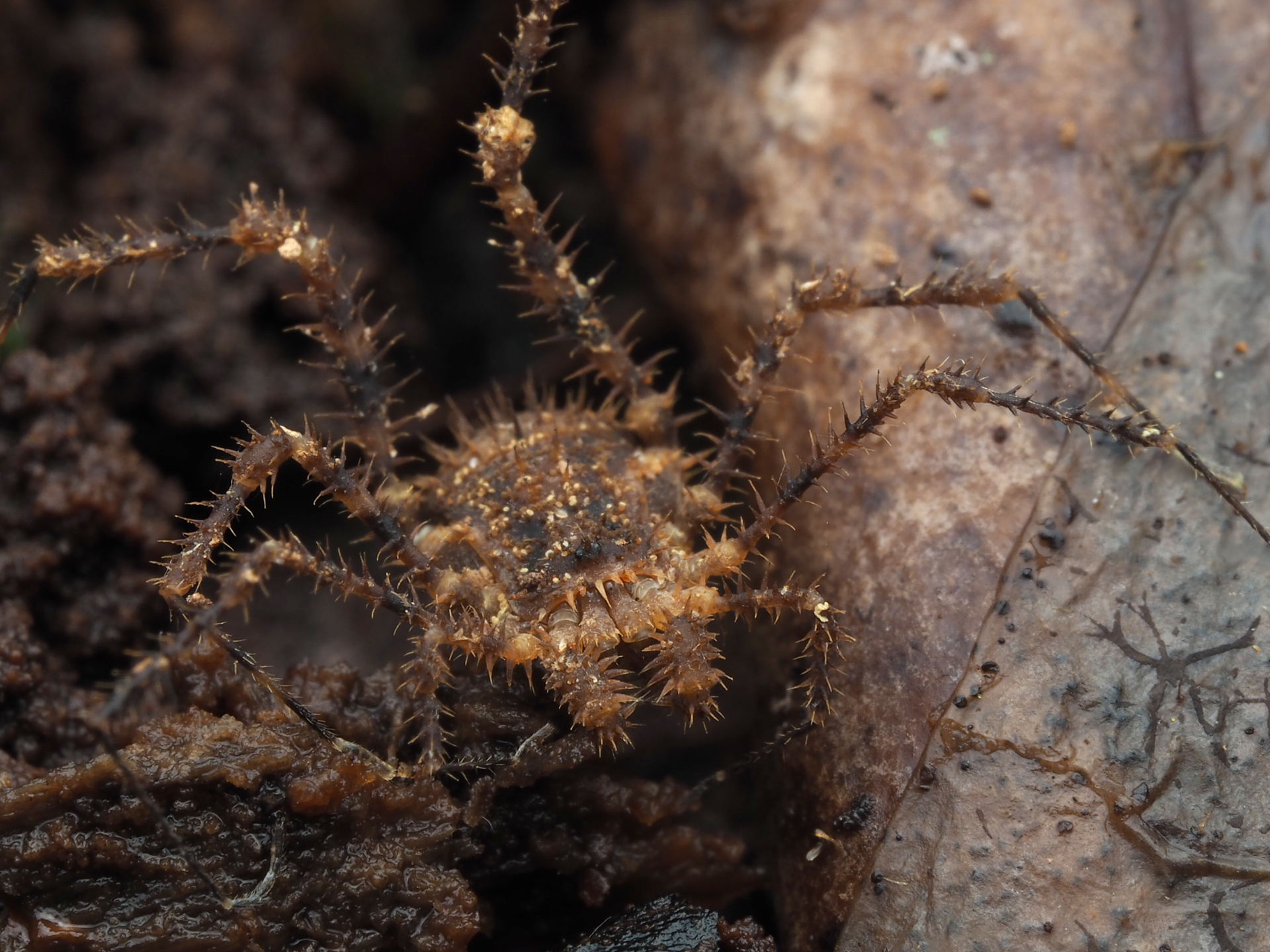
Triregia fairburni fairburni

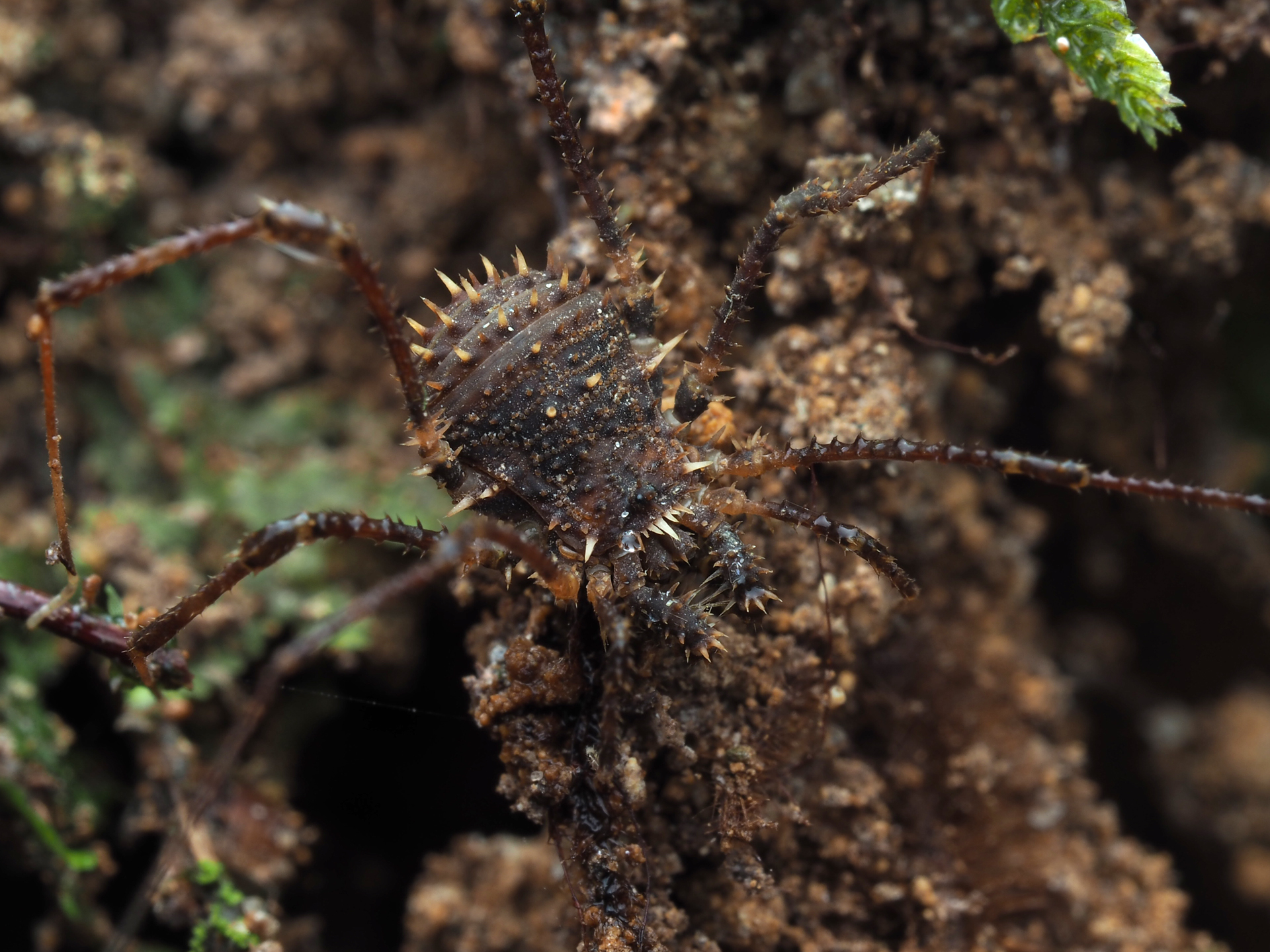
Triregia fairburni grata

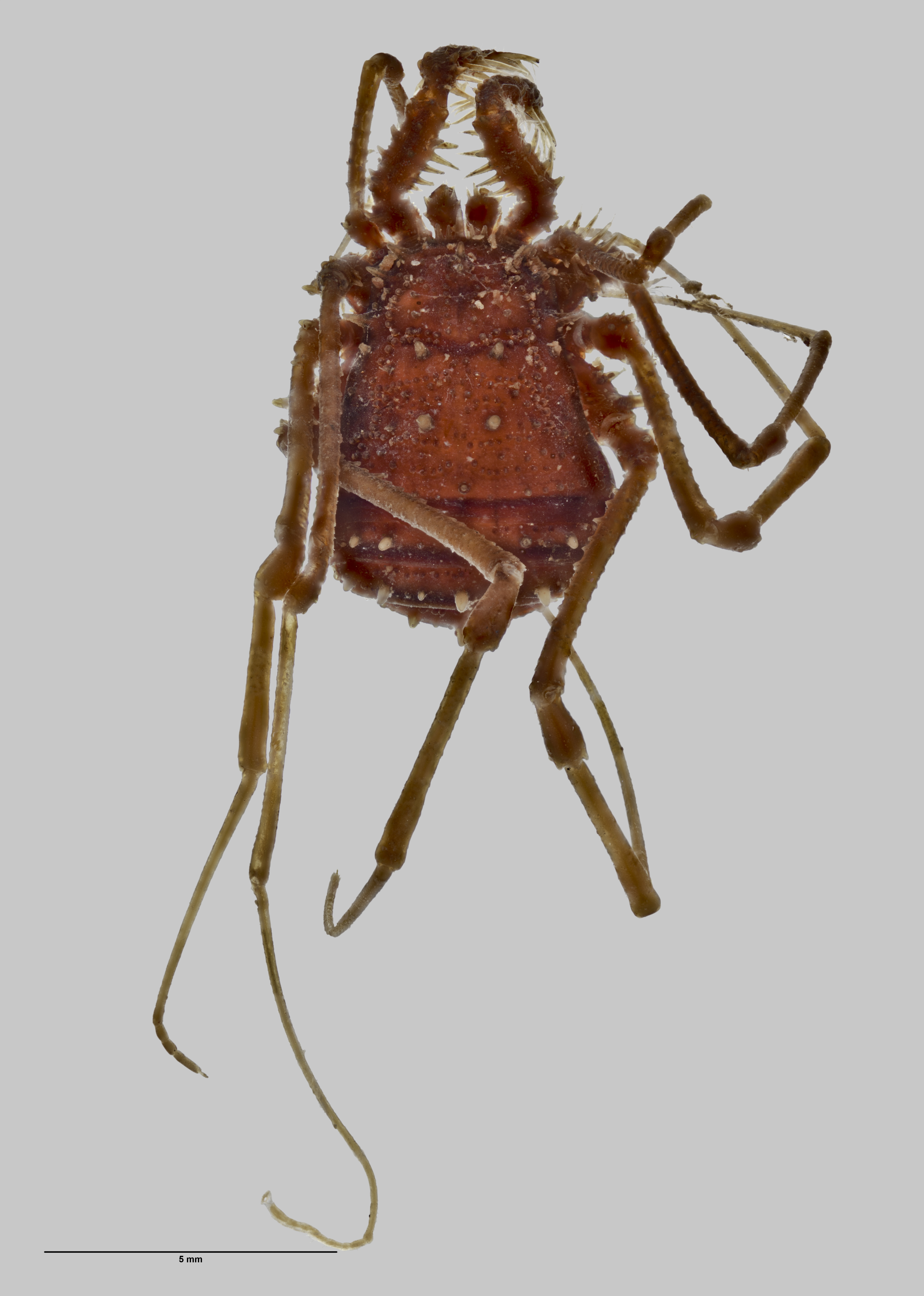
Triregia monstrosa
