= Hickmanoxyomma cavaticum =

Scientific classification
- Domain: Eukaryota
- Kingdom: Animalia
- Phylum: Arthropoda
- Subphylum: Chelicerata
- Class: Arachnida
- Order: Opiliones
- Family: Triaenonychidae
- Genus: Hickmanoxyomma
- Species: H. cavaticum

Binomial name
- Hickmanoxyomma cavaticum (Hickman, 1958)

Species of arachnid

Hickmanoxyomma cavaticum (common name - Ida Bay Cave harvestman) is an endangered species of arachnid, in the family, Triaenonychidae. It was first described in 1958 by Vernon Victor Hickman as Monoxyomma cavaticum, but was reassigned to the genus Hickmanoxyomma in 1990 by Glenn Hunt.
