= List of Cyphophthalmi species =

This page lists all described species of the harvestman suborder Cyphophthalmi. Unless otherwise noted, information is taken from Giribet's 2000 taxonomic catalogue and from Giribet et al., 2012.

== Boreophthalmi ==
=== Sironidae ===
- Arhesiro Karaman, 2022

- Arhesiro clousi (Giribet & Shear, 2010)
- Arhesiro sonoma (Shear, 1980)

- Cyphophthalmus Joseph, 1868

- Cyphophthalmus beschkovi (Mitov, 1994)
- Cyphophthalmus bithynicus (Gruber, 1969)
- Cyphophthalmus conocephalus Karaman, 2009
- Cyphophthalmus corfuanus (Kratochvíl, 1938)
- Cyphophthalmus duricorius Joseph, 1868
- Cyphophthalmus eratoae (Juberthie, 1968)
- Cyphophthalmus ere Karaman, 2008
- Cyphophthalmus gjorgjevici (Hadži, 1933)
- Cyphophthalmus gordani Karaman, 2009
- Cyphophthalmus hlavaci Karaman, 2009
- Cyphophthalmus klisurae (Hadži, 1973)
- Cyphophthalmus kratochvili Karaman, 2009
- Cyphophthalmus markoi Karaman, 2008
- Cyphophthalmus martensi Karaman, 2009
- Cyphophthalmus minutus (Kratochvíl, 1938)
- Cyphophthalmus montenegrinus (Hadzi, 1973)
- Cyphophthalmus neretvanus Karaman, 2009
- Cyphophthalmus noctiphilus (Kratochvíl, 1940)
- Cyphophthalmus nonveilleri Karaman, 2008
- Cyphophthalmus ognjenovici Karaman, 2009
- Cyphophthalmus ohridanus (Hadži, 1973)
- Cyphophthalmus paradoxus (Kratochvíl, 1958)
- Cyphophthalmus paragamiani Karaman, 2009
- Cyphophthalmus rumijae Karaman, 2009
- Cyphophthalmus serbicus (Hadži, 1973)
- Cyphophthalmus silhavyi (Kratochvíl, 1938)
- Cyphophthalmus solentiensis Dreszer, Raða & Giribet, 2015
- Cyphophthalmus teyrovskyi (Kratochvíl, 1938)
- Cyphophthalmus thracicus Karaman, 2009
- Cyphophthalmus trebinjanus Karaman, 2009
- Cyphophthalmus yalovensis (Gruber, 1969)
- Cyphophthalmus zetae Karaman, 2009

- Holosiro Ewing, 1923

- Holosiro acaroides Ewing, 1923
- Holosiro calaveras (Giribet & Shear, 2010)
- Holosiro ewingi Karaman, 2022
- Holosiro shasta (Giribet & Shear, 2010)

- Iberosiro de Bivort & Giribet, 2004

- Iberosiro distylos de Bivort & Giribet, 2004
- Iberosiro rosae Giribet, Merino-Sáinz & Benavides, 2017

- Neosiro Newell, 1943

- Neosiro boyerae (Giribet & Shear, 2010)
- Neosiro exilis (Hoffman, 1963)
- Neosiro kamiakensis Newell, 1943
- Neosiro ligiae (Giribet, 2017)
- Neosiro martensi Karaman, 2022
- Neosiro richarti (Benavides & Giribet, 2017)
- [Also †Neosiro balticus (Dunlop & Mitov, 2011) (fossil, Baltic amber)]

- Odontosiro Juberthie, 1961

- Odontosiro lusitanicus Juberthie, 1961

- Paramiopsalis Juberthie, 1962

- Paramiopsalis anadonae Giribet, Merino-Sáinz & Benavides, 2017
- Paramiopsalis eduardoi Murienne & Giribet, 2009
- Paramiopsalis ramblae Benavides & Giribet, 2017
- Paramiopsalis ramulosa Juberthie, 1962

- Siro Latreille, 1796

- Siro carpaticus Rafalski, 1956
- Siro crassus Novak & Giribet, 2006
- Siro franzi Karaman & Raspotnig, 2022
- Siro ozimeci Karaman, 2022
- Siro rubens Latreille, 1804
- Siro richarti Benavides & Giribet, 2017
- Siro valleorum Chemini, 1990
- [Also †Siro platypedibus Dunlop & Giribet, 2003 (fossil, Baltic amber)]

- Suzukielus Juberthie, 1970

- Suzukielus sauteri (Roewer, 1916)

Insetae sedis:

- Marwe Shear, 1985

- Marwe coarctata Shear, 1985

=== Stylocellidae ===
==== Fangensinae ====
- Fangensis Rambla, 1994

- Fangensis cavernarus Schwendinger & Giribet, 2005
- Fangensis leclerci Rambla, 1994
- Fangensis spelaeus Schwendinger & Giribet, 2005

- Giribetia Clouse, 2012

- Giribetia insulanus (Schwendinger & Giribet, 2005)

==== Leptopsalidinae ====
- Leptopsalis Thorell, 1882

- Leptopsalis beccarii Thorell, 1882
- Leptopsalis dumoga (Shear, 1993)
- Leptopsalis foveolata Clouse & Schwendinger, 2012
- Leptopsalis hillyardi (Shear, 1993)
- Leptopsalis javana (Thorell, 1882)
- Leptopsalis laevichelis (Roewer, 1942)
- Leptopsalis lydekkeri (Clouse & Giribet, 2007)
- Leptopsalis modesta (Hansen & Sørensen, 1904)
- Leptopsalis novaguinea (Clouse & Giribet, 2007)
- Leptopsalis pangrango (Shear, 1993)
- Leptopsalis ramblae (Giribet, 2002)
- Leptopsalis sedgwicki (Shear, 1979)
- Leptopsalis sulcata (Hansen & Sørensen, 1904)
- Leptopsalis tambusisi (Shear, 1993)
- Leptopsalis thorellii (Hansen & Sørensen, 1904)
- Leptopsalis weberii (Hansen & Sørensen, 1904)

- Miopsalis Thorell, 1890

- Miopsalis collinsi (Shear, 1993)
- Miopsalis dillyi Schmidt, Clouse & Sharma, 2020
- Miopsalis globosa (Schwendinger & Giribet, 2004)
- Miopsalis gryllospeca (Shear, 1993)
- Miopsalis kinabalu (Shear, 1993)
- Miopsalis leakeyi (Shear, 1993)
- Miopsalis lionota (Pocock, 1897)
- Miopsalis mulu (Shear, 1993)
- Miopsalis pocockii (Hansen & Sørensen, 1904)
- Miopsalis pulicaria Thorell, 1890
- Miopsalis sabah (Shear, 1993)
- Miopsalis silhavyi (Rambla, 1991)
- Miopsalis tarumpitao (Shear, 1993)

==== Stylocellinae ====
- Meghalaya Giribet, Sharma, & Bastawade, 2007

- Meghalaya annandalei Giribet, Sharma, & Bastawade, 2007

- Stylocellus Westwood, 1874

- Stylocellus lornei Clouse, 2012
- Stylocellus spinifrons Roewer, 1942 (nomen dubium) [unidentifiable juvenile]
- Stylocellus sumatranus Westwood, 1874

== Scopulophthalmi ==
=== Pettalidae ===
- Aoraki Boyer & Giribet, 2007

- Aoraki calcarobtusa (Forster, 1952)
- Aoraki crypta (Forster, 1948)
- Aoraki denticulata (Forster, 1948)

- Aoraki denticulata denticulata (Forster, 1948)
- Aoraki denticulata major (Forster, 1948)

- Aoraki granulosa (Forster, 1952)
- Aoraki healyi (Forster, 1948)
- Aoraki inerma (Forster, 1948)
- Aoraki longitarsa (Forster, 1952)
- Aoraki stephenesis (Forster, 1952)
- Aoraki tumidata (Forster, 1948)
- Aoraki westlandica (Forster, 1952)

- Archaeopurcellia Giribet, Shaw, Lord & Derkarabetian, 2022

- Archaeopurcellia eureka Giribet, Shaw, Lord & Derkarabetian, 2022

- Austropurcellia Juberthie, 1988

- Austropurcellia absens Boyer & Popkin-Hall, 2015
- Austropurcellia acuta Popkin-Hall & Boyer, 2014
- Austropurcellia alata Boyer & Reuter, 2012
- Austropurcellia arcticosa (Cantrell, 1980)
- Austropurcellia barbata Popkin-Hall & Boyer, 2014
- Austropurcellia cadens Baker & Boyer, 2015
- Austropurcellia capricornia (Davies, 1977)
- Austropurcellia clousei Boyer, Baker & Popkin-Hall, 2015
- Austropurcellia culminis Boyer & Reuter, 2012
- Austropurcellia daviesae (Juberthie, 1989)
- Austropurcellis despectata Boyer & Reuter, 2012
- Austropurcellia finniganensis Popkin-Hall, Jay & Boyer, 2016
- Austropurcellia forsteri (Juberthie, 2000)
- Austropurcellia fragosa Popkin-Hall, Jay & Boyer, 2016
- Austropurcellia giribeti Boyer & Quay, 2015
- Austropurcellia megatanka Jay, Coblens & Boyer, 2016
- Austropurcellia monteithi Jay, Popkin-Hall, Coblens & Boyer, 2016
- Austropurcellia nuda Popkin-Hall, Jay & Boyer, 2016
- Austropurcellia riedeli Jay, Oberski & Boyer, 2016
- Austropurcellia scoparia Juberthie, 1988
- Austropurcellia sharmai Boyer & Quay, 2015
- Austropurcellia superbensis Popkin-Hall & Boyer, 2014
- Austropurcellia tholei Baker & Boyer, 2015
- Austropurcellia vicina Boyer & Reuter, 2012
- Austropurcellia woodwardi (Forster, 1955)

- Chileogovea Roewer, 1961

- Chileogovea jocasta Shear, 1993
- Chileogovea oedipus Roewer, 1961

- Karripurcellia Giribet, 2003

- Karripurcellia peckorum Giribet, 2003
- Karripurcellia sierwaldae Giribet, 2003

- Manangotria Shear & Gruber, 1996

- Manangotria taolanaro Shear & Gruber, 1996

- Neopurcellia Forster, 1948

- Neopurcellia salmoni Forster, 1948

- Parapurcellia Rosas Costa, 1950

- Parapurcellia amatola de Bivort & Giribet, 2010
- Parapurcellia convexa de Bivort & Giribet, 2010
- Parapurcellia fissa (Lawrence, 1939)
- Parapurcellia minuta de Bivort & Giribet, 2010
- Parapurcellia monticola (Lawrence, 1939)
- Parapurcellia natalia de Bivort & Giribet, 2010
- Parapurcellia rumpiana (Lawrence, 1933)
- Parapurcellia peregrinator (Lawrence, 1963)
- Parapurcellia silvicola (Lawrence, 1939)
- Parapurcellia staregai de Bivort & Giribet, 2010
- Parapurcellia transvaalica (Lawrence, 1963)

- Pettalus Thorell, 1876

- Pettalus brevicauda Pocock, 1897
- Pettalus cimiciformis (Cambridge, 1875)
- Pettalus lampetides Sharma & Giribet 2006
- Pettalus thwaitesi Sharma, Karunarathna & Giribet, 2009

- Purcellia Hansen & Sørensen, 1904

- Purcellia argasiformis (Lawrence, 1931)
- Purcellia griswaldi de Bivort & Giribet, 2010
- Purcellia illustrans Hansen and Sørensen, 1904
- Purcellia lawrencei de Bivort & Giribet, 2010
- Purcellia leleupi Staręga, 2008

- Rakaia Hirst, 1926

- Rakaia antipodiana Hirst, 1926
- Rakaia collaria Roewer, 1942
- Rakaia dorothea Phillips and Grimmett, 1932
- Rakaia florensis (Forster, 1948)
- Rakaia isolata Forster, 1952
- Rakaia lindsayi Forster, 1952
- Rakaia macra Boyer and Giribet, 2003
- Rakaia magna Forster, 1948

- Rakaia magna australis Forster, 1952
- Rakaia magna magna Forster, 1948

- Rakaia media Forster, 1948

- Rakaia media media Forster, 1948
- Rakaia media insula Forster, 1952

- Rakaia minutissima (Forster, 1948)
- Rakaia pauli Forster, 1952
- Rakaia solitaria Forster, 1948
- Rakaia sorenseni Forster, 1952

- Rakaia sorenseni digitata Forster, 1952
- Rakaia sorenseni sorenseni Forster, 1952

- Rakaia stewartiensis Forster, 1948
- Rakaia uniloca Forster, 1952

== Sternophthalmi ==
=== Neogoveidae ===
- Brasiliogovea Martens, 1969

- Brasiliogovea aphantostylus Benavides, Hormiga, & Giribet, 2019
- Brasiliogovea chiribiqueta Benavides & Giribet, 2013
- Brasiliogovea microphaga Martens, 1969
- Brasiliogovea microstylus Benavides, Hormiga, & Giribet, 2019
- Brasiliogovea yacambuensis Benavides, Hormiga, & Giribet, 2019

- Canga DaSilva, Pinto-da-Rocha & Giribet, 2010

- Canga renatae DaSilva, Pinto-da-Rocha & Giribet, 2010

- Huitaca Shear, 1979

- Huitaca boyacanensis Benavides & Giribet, 2013
- Huitaca bitaco Benavides & Giribet, 2013
- Huitaca caldas Benavides & Giribet, 2013
- Huitaca depressa Benavides & Giribet, 2013
- Huitaca sharkeyi Benavides & Giribet, 2013
- Huitaca tama Benavides & Giribet, 2013
- Huitaca ventralis Shear, 1979

- Leggogovia Benavides & Giribet, 2019

- Leggogovia pabsgarnoni (Legg. 1990)

- Metagovea Rosas-Costa, 1950

- Metagovea disparunguis Rosas Costa, 1950
- Metagovea ligiae Giupponi & Kury, 2015
- Metagovea matapi Benavides, Hormiga, & Giribet, 2019
- Metagovea philipi Goodnight & Goodnight, 1980
- Metagovea planada Benavides, Hormiga, & Giribet, 2019

- Metasiro Juberthie, 1960

- Metasiro americanus (Davis, 1933)
- Metasiro savannahensis Clouse & Wheeler, 2014
- Metasiro sassafrasensis Clouse & Wheeler, 2014

- Microgovia Benavides, Hormiga, & Giribet, 2019

- Microgovia chenepau Benavides, Hormiga, & Giribet, 2019
- Microgovia oviformis Martens, 1969

- Neogovea Hinton, 1938

- Neogovea branstetteri Benavides, Hormiga, & Giribet, 2019
- Neogovea enigmatica Martens, 2019
- Neogovea hormigai Benavides & Giribet, 2013
- Neogovea immsi Hinton, 1938
- Neogovea kamakusa Shear, 1977
- Neogovea kartabo Shear, 1977
- Neogovea matawai Benavides, Hormiga, & Giribet, 2019
- Neogovea virginie Jocqué & Jocqué, 2011

- Parogovia Hansen, 1921

- Parogovia gabonica (Juberthie, 1969)
- Parogovia montealensis Benavides & Giribet, 2019
- Parogovia parasironoides Hiřman, Kotyk, Kotyková Varadínová,& Šťáhlavský, 2018
- Parogovia prietoi Benavides & Giribet, 2019
- Parogovia putnami Benavides & Giribet, 2019
- Parogovia sironoides Hansen, 1921

- Tucanogovea Karaman, 2014

- Tucanogovea schusteri Karaman, 2014

- Waiwaigovia Benavides, Hormiga, & Giribet, 2019

- Waiwaigovia shultzi Benavides, Hormiga, & Giribet, 2019

=== Ogoveidae ===
- Ogovea Roewer, 1923

- Ogovea cameroonensis Giribet & Prieto, 2003
- Ogovea grossa (Hansen & Sørensen, 1904)
- Ogovea nasuta (Hansen, 1921)

=== Troglosironidae ===
- Troglosiro Juberthie, 1979

- Troglosiro aelleni Juberthie, 1979
- Troglosiro brevifossa Sharma & Giribet, 2009
- Troglosiro dogny Giribet & Baker, 2021
- Troglosiro juberthiei Shear, 1993
- Troglosiro longifossa Sharma & Giribet, 2005
- Troglosiro monteithi Sharma & Giribet, 2009
- Troglosiro ninqua Shear, 1993
- Troglosiro oscitatio Sharma & Giribet, 2009
- Troglosiro pin Giribet, Baker & Sharma, 2021
- Troglosiro platnicki Shear, 1993
- Troglosiro pseudojuberthiei Giribet, Baker & Sharma, 2021
- Troglosiro raveni Shear, 1993
- Troglosiro sharmai Giribet & Baker, 2021
- Troglosiro sheari Sharma & Giribet, 2009
- Troglosiro tillierorum Shear, 1993
- Troglosiro urbanus Sharma & Giribet, 2009
- Troglosiro wilsoni Sharma & Giribet, 2009

== Incertae sedis ==
- Ankaratra Shear & Gruber, 1996

- Ankaratra franzi Shear & Gruber, 1996

- Shearogovea Giribet, 2011

- Shearogovea mexasca (Shear, 1977)

Parasironidae Karaman, Mitov & Snegovaya, 2024

- Cimmerosiro Karaman, Mitov & Snegovaya, 2024

- Cimmerosiro juberthiei Karaman, Mitov & Snegovaya, 2024
- Cimmerosiro krivolutskyi Karaman, Mitov & Snegovaya, 2024
- Cimmerosiro rhodiensis Karaman, Mitov & Snegovaya, 2024

- Ebrosiro Karaman, Mitov & Snegovaya, 2024

- Ebrosiro coiffaiti (Juberthie, 1956)

- Parasiro Hansen & Sørensen, 1904

- Parasiro corsicus (Simon, 1872)

- Tirrenosiro Karaman, Mitov & Snegovaya, 2024

- Tirrenosiro axeli Karaman, Mitov & Snegovaya, 2024
- Tirrenosiro minor (Juberthie, 1958)
