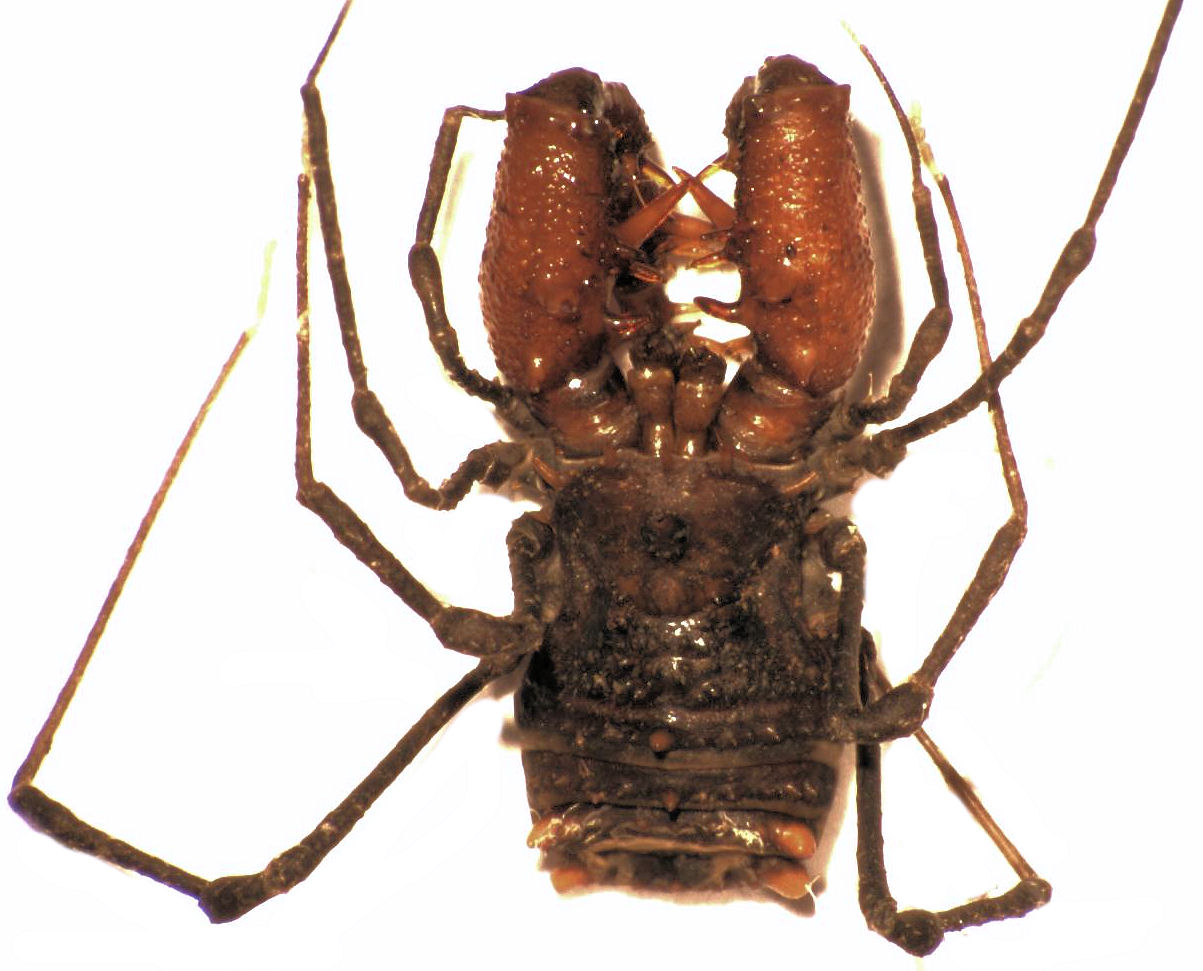
- Karamea lobata

Scientific classification
- Kingdom: Animalia
- Phylum: Arthropoda
- Subphylum: Chelicerata
- Class: Arachnida
- Order: Opiliones
- Family: Triaenonychidae
- Subfamily: Sorensenellinae; Forster, 1954

Genera
- Sorensenella Pocock, 1903; Karamea Forster, 1954; Lawrencella Strand, 1932; Speleomontia Lawrence, 1931

= Sorensenellinae =

Subfamily of harvester

Sorensenellinae is a subfamily of harvestmen in the family Triaenonychidae created by Ray Forster. It includes genera from New Zealand and South Africa, but later phylogenetic studies do not support the inclusion of the South African taxa. Egg guarding is reported in both New Zealand genera and appears to be an example of paternal care.

== Taxonomy ==
Sorensenellinae is a subfamily of harvestmen in the family Triaenonychidae and was erected by Ray Forster in his 1954 monograph on New Zealand Laniatores. The subfamily includes four genera: Sorensenella Pocock, 1903 and Karamea Forster, 1954 from New Zealand, and Roeweria Lawrence, 1931 (now Lawrencella Strand, 1932) and Speleomontia Lawrence, 1931 from South Africa. Forster's spelling was Soerensenellinae, which he derived from Soerensenella, which was an incorrect spelling of the original name of Sorensenella.

== Key features ==
Forster described members of this subfamily as having the third and fourth tarsal claws with strong lateral processes equal to, or larger than the median prong. Forster also noted the laying of eggs in a single group that is subsequently guarded by the female until they hatch.

== Paternal care ==
While Forster reported that egg guarding by females is a feature of the Sorensenellinae, Glauco Machado observed that a photograph on p56 of Ray and Lyn Forster's book Spiders of New Zealand and their Worldwide Kin clearly showed a male specimen of Karamea guarding eggs, even though the caption states it is female. Based on Forster's statement of egg guarding behaviour across Sorensenellinae, Machado reasoned that paternal rather than maternal care was likely to be the rule in this subfamily.

== Phylogenetics ==
Molecular studies using Sanger and ultra conserved element sequencing show Sorensenella forms a clade with its nearest relative Karamea, and these genera are estimated to have diverged from one another during the Cretaceous. While these studies affirm the close relationship between Soerensenella and Karamea, they do not support Forster's inclusion of Roeweria (now Lawrencella) and Speleomontia from South Africa in Sorensenellinae.
