= Parasironidae =

Parasironidae Temporal range: Palaeogene–present

Scientific classification
- Domain: Eukaryota
- Kingdom: Animalia
- Phylum: Arthropoda
- Subphylum: Chelicerata
- Class: Arachnida
- Order: Opiliones
- Suborder: Cyphophthalmi
- Family: Parasironidae; Karaman, Mitov & Snegovaya, 2024

Diversity
- 4 genera, 7 species

Family of arachnids

Parasironidae is a family of harvestmen with 7 described species.

The family shows a European distribution, with species found in the Mediterranean.

== Name ==
Parasironidae is derived from the type genus Parasiro Hansen & Sørensen, 1904.

== Species ==
Below is from "World Catalog of Opiliones" (as of early 2024, after transfer of Parasiro).

- Cimmerosiro Karaman, Mitov & Snegovaya, 2024

- Cimmerosiro juberthiei Karaman, Mitov & Snegovaya, 2024 – Turkey
- Cimmerosiro krivolutskyi Karaman, Mitov & Snegovaya, 2024 – Georgia
- Cimmerosiro rhodiensis Karaman, Mitov & Snegovaya, 2024 – Greece

- Ebrosiro Karaman, Mitov & Snegovaya, 2024

- Ebrosiro coiffaiti (Juberthie, 1956) – Spain, France ("Ebro continental Block")

- Parasiro Hansen & Sørensen, 1904

- Parasiro corsicus (Simon, 1872) – France (Corsica)

- Tirrenosiro Karaman, Mitov & Snegovaya, 2024

- Tirrenosiro axeli Karaman, Mitov & Snegovaya, 2024 – Italy
- Tirrenosiro minor (Juberthie, 1958) – France (Corsica), Italy (Sardinia)

== See also ==
- List of Cyphophthalmi species#Boreophthalmi

== Sources ==
- Pinto-da-Rocha, R., Machado, G. & Giribet, G. (eds.) (2007). Harvestmen – The Biology of Opiliones. Harvard University Press, USA. ISBN 0-674-02343-9
- Boyer, Sarah L.; Karaman, Ivo M. & Giribet, Gonzalo (2005): The genus Cyphophthalmus (Arachnida, Opiliones, Cyphophthalmi) in Europe: A phylogenetic approach to Balkan Peninsula biogeography. Molecular Phylogenetics and Evolution 36(3): 554–567. doi:10.1016/j.ympev.2005.04.004
- Checklist of the Cyphophthalmi species of the World
