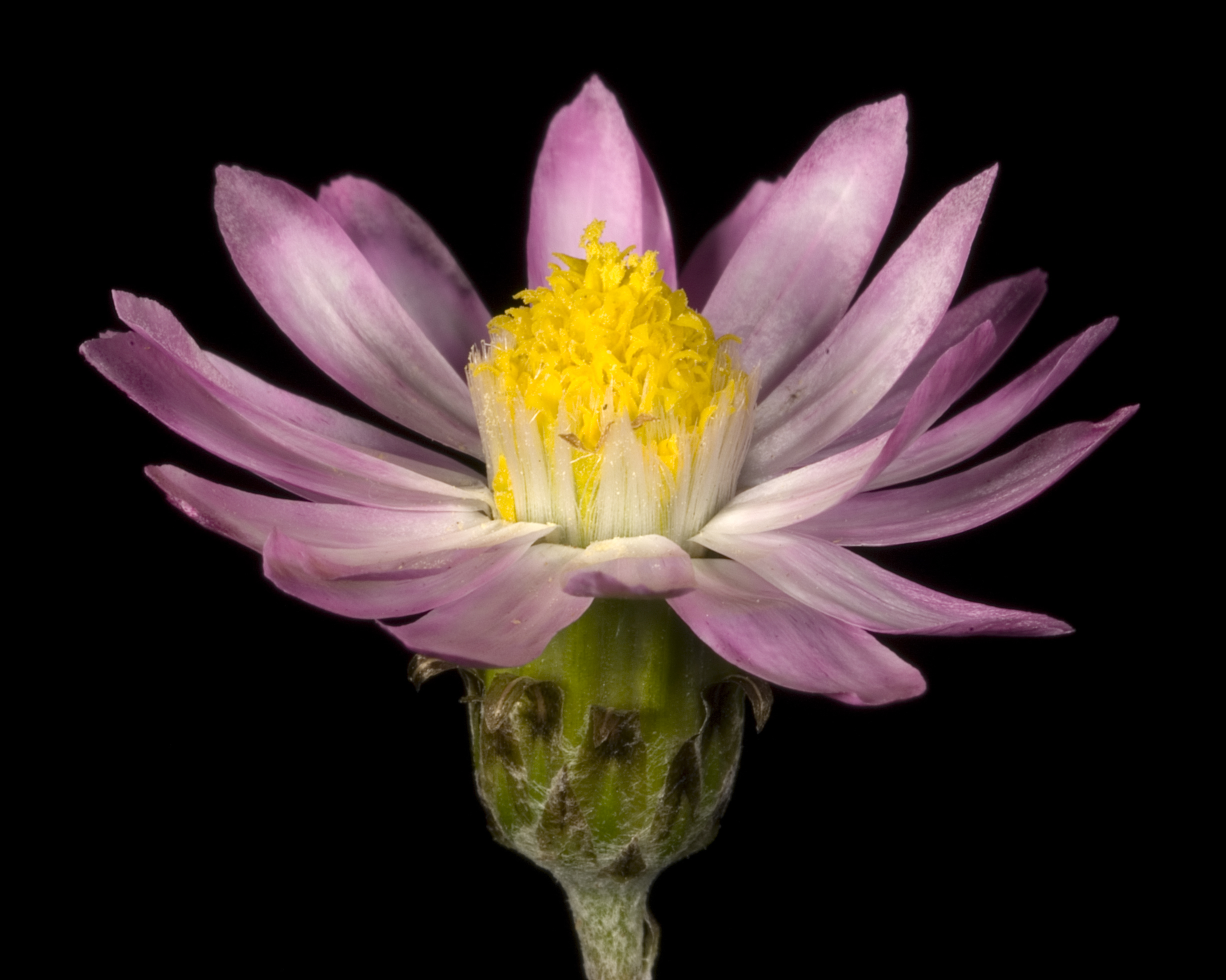
- Lawrencella rosea

Scientific classification
- Kingdom: Plantae
- Clade: Tracheophytes
- Clade: Angiosperms
- Clade: Eudicots
- Clade: Asterids
- Order: Asterales
- Family: Asteraceae
- Tribe: Gnaphalieae
- Genus: Lawrencella
- Species: L. rosea

Binomial name
- Lawrencella rosea Lindl.

= Lawrencella rosea =

Lindley's everlasting

Genus of flowering plants

Lawrencella rosea is a flowering plant in the family Asteraceae and is endemic to Western Australia. It is a small, upright, annual herb with pink flowers.

== Description ==
Lawrencella rosea is a small, upright, multi-stemmed, branching annual, stems about 0.3 m (1 ft 0 in) high, leaves are linear, mostly green and up to 100 mm (3.9 in) long. The flowers are borne singly at the end of stems that are almost hairless, up to 3.5–4 cm (1.4–1.6 in) across, bracts pink, rarely white and the centre yellow. Flowering occurs in spring and summer.

== Taxonomy and naming ==
Lawrencella rosea was first formally described in 1839 by John Lindley and the description was published in A Sketch of the Vegetation of the Swan River Colony. The specific epithet (rosea) means "rosy" referring to the flowers.

== Distribution and habitat ==
Lindley's everlasting grows in mulga scrub and woodland in the south-west of Western Australia.
