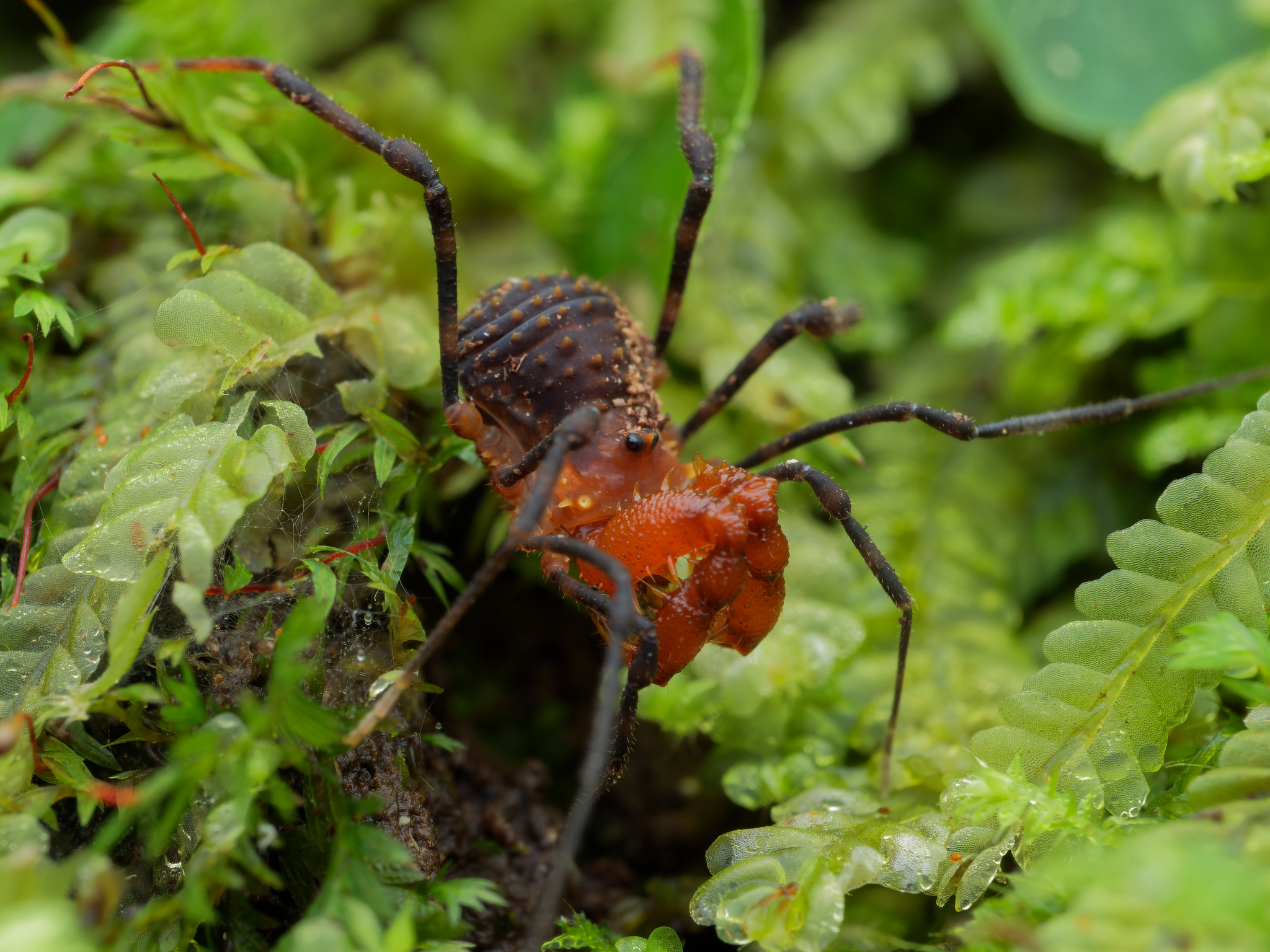
- Sorensenella prehensor

Scientific classification
- Kingdom: Animalia
- Phylum: Arthropoda
- Subphylum: Chelicerata
- Class: Arachnida
- Order: Opiliones
- Family: Triaenonychidae
- Genus: Sorensenella; Pocock, 1903

Species
- See text

Synonyms
- Akaroa Roewer, 1931

= Sorensenella =

Genus of harvester

Sorensenella is a genus in the harvestman subfamily Sorensenellinae in the family Triaenonychidae. It is endemic to New Zealand and currently includes three species and several subspecies. Members of this genus have large pedipalps armed with strong spines. The pedipalps are larger in males.

== Taxonomy ==
The genus Sorensenella was erected by R.I. Pocock in 1903. The type species is Sorensenalla prehensor and is held at the Natural History Museum, London. Carl Friedrich Roewer erected the genus Akaroa in 1932, but Ray Forster synonymised this under Sorensenella in his monograph on the New Zealand Laniatores.

== Etymology ==
Although not stated by Pocock's relevant works, the genus seems likely named in honour of the in honour of the Danish Zoologist William Sørensen. Forster gave the spelling of the genus as the modified Soerensenella, following Roewer and other authors (e.g. per Roewer (1915) from interpretation of the alternative spelling as Sörensenella in Pocock's introduction, p.392). However, Sorensenella Pocock 1903 can be taken as the correct original spelling, as fixed by Pocock himself in a subsequent paper as first reviser.

== Included species ==
Sorensenella contains the following species and subspecies:

- Sorensenella bicornis Pocock, 1903
  - Sorensenella bicornis bicornis Pocock, 1903
  - Sorensenella bicornis parva Forster, 1954
  - Sorensenella bicornis waikanae Forster, 1954
- Sorensenella prehensor Pocock, 1903
  - Sorensenella prehensor prehensor Pocock, 1903
  - Sorensenella prehensor nitida Forster, 1954
  - Sorensenella prehensor obesa Forster, 1954
- Sorensenella rotara Phillipps & Grimmett, 1932

Forster's (1954) revision includes keys to species for most of the genera it covers, but not for Sorensenella. However, Forster did include the species and subspecies of Sorensenella in a larger key to New Zealand Opiliones published in two parts.

Forster also erected the subfamily Sorensenellinae to accommodate Sorensenella Pocock, 1903 and Karamea Forster, 1954 from New Zealand, and Roeweria Lawrence, 1931 (now Lawrencella Strand, 1932) and Speleomontia Lawrence, 1931 from South Africa.

== General appearance ==
In Sorensenella, the dorsal (upper) surface has one or two spinous tubercles (conical projections) located on the sides of the carapace and level with or forward of the eyemound (a raised, rounded structure with two eyes). These are pointing at or near right angles to the body. The eyemound has a small spine on the apex. Behind the eyemound, the carapace has several pairs of tubercles, while the free tergites (the rearmost portion each have a row of weak tubercles. The pedipalps are strongly armed with spines and are larger in males than females. Body colouring is typically in shades of brown, grey or black, The chelicerae and pedipalps are commonly red-brown or other shades of brown and are a lighter tone and glossier than the rest of the body. Sorensenella most closely resembles the New Zealand-endemic genus Karamea, but lacks the prominent, forward-directed eyemound spine of the latter.

== Geographic range ==
Soerensenella is only found in New Zealand. In the North Island, it is more commonly seen in central and northern regions, with no records south of Waikanae. In the South Island it is found in the Canterbury region. Its range does not appear to overlap with that of Karamea.

== Phylogenetics ==
Molecular studies using Sanger and ultra conserved element sequencing showed Sorensenella is part of a clade that includes the majority of New Zealand triaenonychid genera, as well as several genera from Australia, New Caledonia and South America. Sorensenella forms a subclade with its nearest relative Karamea, and these genera are estimated to have diverged from one another during the Cretaceous. While these studies affirm the close relationship between Soerensenella and Karamea, they do not support Forster's inclusion of Roeweria (now Lawrencella) and Speleomontia from South Africa in Sorensenellinae.
