= Arhesiro =

Scientific classification
- Domain: Eukaryota
- Kingdom: Animalia
- Phylum: Arthropoda
- Subphylum: Chelicerata
- Class: Arachnida
- Order: Opiliones
- Suborder: Cyphophthalmi
- Infraorder: Boreophthalmi
- Family: Sironidae
- Genus: Arhesiro; Karaman, 2022

Type species
- Siro clousi Giribet & Shear, 2010

Species
- See text

Diversity
- 2 species

Genus of harvestmen/daddy longlegs

Arhesiro is a genus of mite harvestman in the family Sironidae (as of 2023). It is found in North America, only in the US, with one species in California, another in Oregon.

== Description ==
The genus Arhesiro was described by Karaman, 2022, with the type species Siro clousi Giribet & Shear, 2010. Before then, the two included species Arhesiro clousi and Arhesiro sonoma were previously placed in Siro.

== Species ==
These species belong to the genus Arhesiro Karaman, 2022:

- Arhesiro clousi (Giribet & Shear, 2010) – US (Oregon)
- Arhesiro sonoma (Shear, 1980) – US (Oregon)

== Etymology ==
The genus is masculine, derived from Siro
