= Holosiro =

Scientific classification
- Kingdom: Animalia
- Phylum: Arthropoda
- Subphylum: Chelicerata
- Class: Arachnida
- Order: Opiliones
- Suborder: Cyphophthalmi
- Infraorder: Boreophthalmi
- Family: Sironidae
- Genus: Holosiro; Ewing, 1923

Type species
- Holosiro acaroides Ewing, 1923

Species
- See text

Diversity
- 4 species

Genus of harvestmen/daddy longlegs

Holosiro is a genus of mite harvestman in the family Sironidae. It is found in North America, only in the US, with one species in California, another in Oregon.

== Description ==
The genus Holosiro was described by Ewing, 1923, with the type species Holosiro acaroides Ewing, 1923. For several years the genus was treated as a junior subjective synonym Siro Latreille, 1797.

== Species ==
These species belong to the genus Holosiro:

- Holosiro acaroides Ewing, 1923 – US (Washington, Oregon, California)
- Holosiro calaveras (Giribet & Shear, 2010) – US (California)
- Holosiro ewingi Karaman, 2022 – US (Oregon)
- Holosiro shasta (Giribet & Shear, 2010) – US (California)

== Etymology ==
The genus is masculine, derived from Siro
