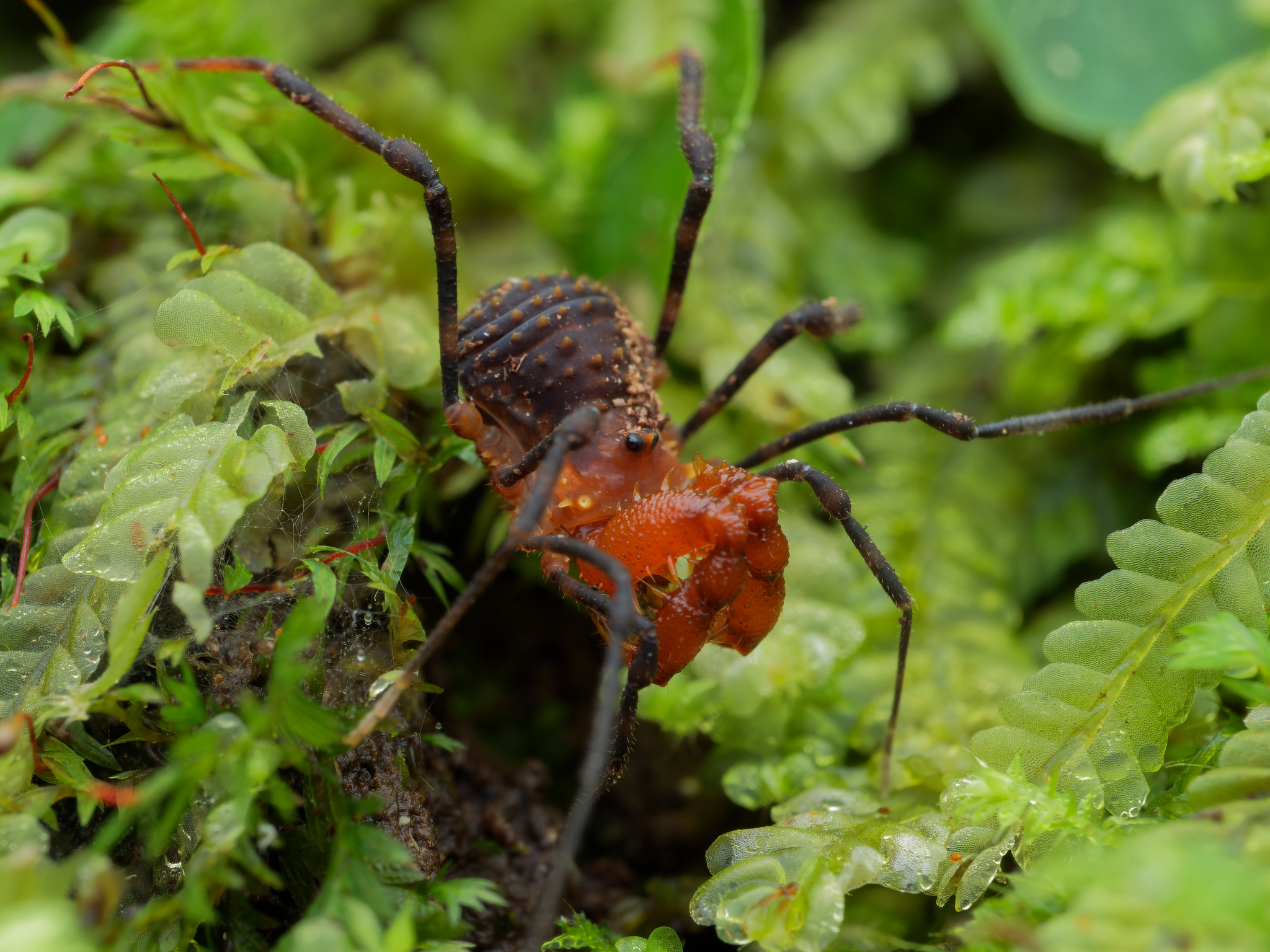

Scientific classification
- Kingdom: Animalia
- Phylum: Arthropoda
- Subphylum: Chelicerata
- Class: Arachnida
- Order: Opiliones
- Family: Triaenonychidae
- Genus: Sorensenella
- Species: S. prehensor

Binomial name
- Sorensenella prehensor Pocock, 1903

= Sorensenella prehensor =

Speciesof harvester

Sorensenella prehensor is a species in the endemic New Zealand genus Sorensenella described by Reginald Pocock in 1903. Ray Forster revised the genus Sorensenella in 1954. As well as the nominate subspecies, Sorensenella prehensor prehensor, added two other subspecies, S. prehensor nitida and S. prehensor obesa. This species is found from Auckland to North Cape in New Zealand's North Island.

== Taxonomy ==
Sorensenella prehensor
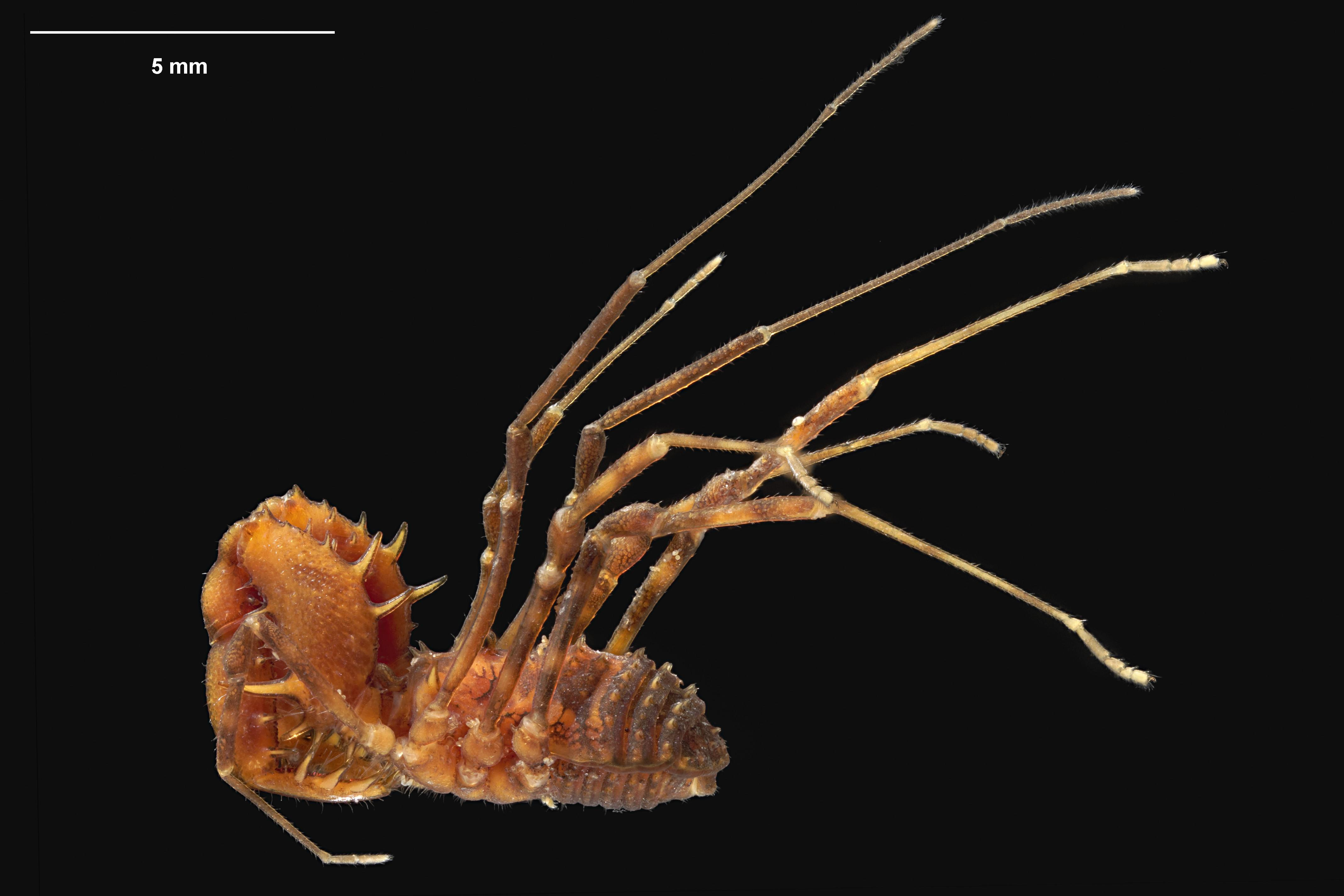
- Sorensenella prehensor nitida holotype specimen from the Kopuapounamu River, Ruakumara Range, East Cape, New Zealand

Scientific classification
- Kingdom: Animalia
- Phylum: Arthropoda
- Subphylum: Chelicerata
- Class: Arachnida
- Order: Opiliones
- Family: Triaenonychidae
- Genus: Sorensenella
- Species: S. prehensor
- Subspecies: S. p. nitida

Trinomial name
- Sorensenella prehensor nitida Forster, 1954

Sorensenella prehensor is the type species of the genus Sorensenella and was described by Pocock in 1903. Pocock did not explicitly designate a type specimen. However, Forster's 1954 revision of the genus Sorensenella noted there was only a single specimen in the British Museum, and that Pocock's description also implied this. Forster also noted that Carl F. Roewer's figure of S. prehensor was a specimen of S. bicornis.

Forster's revision in his 1954 monograph added two subspecies based on minor morphological and geographical grounds: S. prehensor nitida and S. prehensor obesa. Sorensenella prehensor nitida is a member of the New Zealand endemic genus Sorensenella in the opilionid (harvestman) family Triaenonychidae. S. prehensor nitida was differented on the basis of geographic range and eyemound characteristics.

The type specimen of S. p. nitida is held at Te Papa.

== Description ==
Sorensenella prehensor has the general characteristics of Sorensenella. Forster's redescription based on a greater range of material than was available to Pocock notes the following additional characters. Colour reddish brown with a black pattern on the scute (the unsegmented portion of the carapace). Free tergites are blackish with a transverse row of pale brown spots. The chelicerae and pedipalps have reticulated dorsal markings. Females have more slender pedipalps than males. The tubercles (pointed protuberances) behind the anterior corners of the carapace are also smaller, as is the tubercle on top of the eyemound.

The nominate subspecies S. prehensor prehensor may be distinguished from S. prehensor nitida by having a larger tubercle on the eyemound in both males and females. Sorensenella prehensor nitida is also confined to East Cape, while S. p. prehensor is found in the northern North Island. Males of this subspecies have larger pedipalps than females. While Forster provided measurements for both males and females, he did not give any additional descriptive detail other than noting there is a pair of subequal tubercles behind each anterior corner of the carapace and the inner tubercle is strong. The only figures provided depict the male and female eyemounds.

Sorensenella p. prehensor may be separated from S. p. obesa by the latter's greater size and slightly backward-pointing eyemound tubercle. Both are found at North Cape, with S. p. obesa confined to a separate population in the northernmost part of the region.

== Distribution ==
Sorensenella prehensor is found in the northern North Island of New Zealand, from Auckland to North Cape.

== Conservation status ==
This species has not been assessed as part of the New Zealand Threat Classification system.
