= Cimmerosiro =

Scientific classification
- Domain: Eukaryota
- Kingdom: Animalia
- Phylum: Arthropoda
- Subphylum: Chelicerata
- Class: Arachnida
- Order: Opiliones
- Suborder: Cyphophthalmi
- Family: Parasironidae
- Genus: Cimmerosiro; Karaman, Mitov & Snegovaya, 2024

Type species
- Cimmerosiro krivolutskyi Karaman, Mitov & Snegovaya, 2024

Species
- See text

Diversity
- 3 species

Genus of harvestmen/daddy longlegs

Cimmerosiro is a genus of harvestmen in the suborder Cyphophthalmi with three described species (as of 2024). All three species are found in Eastern Europe and West Asia.

== Description ==
The genus Cimmerosiro was described by Karaman, Mitov & Snegovaya, 2024, with the type species Cimmerosiro krivolutskyi Karaman, Mitov & Snegovaya, 2024.

== Species ==
These species belong to the genus Cimmerosiro:

- Cimmerosiro Karaman, Mitov & Snegovaya, 2024

- Cimmerosiro juberthiei Karaman, Mitov & Snegovaya, 2024 – Turkey
- Cimmerosiro krivolutskyi Karaman, Mitov & Snegovaya, 2024 – Georgia
- Cimmerosiro rhodiensis Karaman, Mitov & Snegovaya, 2024 – Greece

== Etymology ==
The genus is masculine. The prefix is derived from the ancient continent Cimmeria, as the western part is claimed to be associated with the origin and distribution of the family Parasironidae. The suffix echos the name Siro, as a common suffix for several cyphophthalmid genera.
