= Cyphophthalmus eratoae =

Scientific classification
- Kingdom: Animalia
- Phylum: Arthropoda
- Subphylum: Chelicerata
- Class: Arachnida
- Order: Opiliones
- Family: Sironidae
- Genus: Cyphophthalmus
- Species: C. eratoae

Binomial name
- Cyphophthalmus eratoae Juberthie, 1968

Species of arachnid

Cyphophthalmus eratoae is a species of harvestman in the family Sironidae found in Greece.

== Distribution ==
This species is endemic to Greece.
