= Tirrenosiro =

Scientific classification
- Domain: Eukaryota
- Kingdom: Animalia
- Phylum: Arthropoda
- Subphylum: Chelicerata
- Class: Arachnida
- Order: Opiliones
- Suborder: Cyphophthalmi
- Family: Parasironidae
- Genus: Tirrenosiro; Karaman, Mitov & Snegovaya, 2024

Type species
- Parasiro minor (Juberthie, 1958).

Species
- See text

Diversity
- 2 species

Genus of harvestmen/daddy longlegs

Tirrenosiro is a genus of harvestmen in the suborder Cyphophthalmi with two described species (as of 2024). Both species are found in Southern Europe.

== Description ==
The genus Tirrenosiro was described by Karaman, Mitov & Snegovaya, 2024, with the type species Parasiro minor Juberthie, 1958.

== Species ==
These species belong to the genus Tirrenosiro:

- Tirrenosiro Karaman, Mitov & Snegovaya, 2024

- Tirrenosiro axeli Karaman, Mitov & Snegovaya, 2024 – Italy
- Tirrenosiro minor (Juberthie, 1958) – France (Corsica), Italy (Sardinia)

== Etymology ==
The genus is masculine. The prefix is derived from the Tyrrhenian Sea, reflecting the distribution of the described species. The suffix echos the name Siro, as a common suffix for several cyphophthalmid genera.
