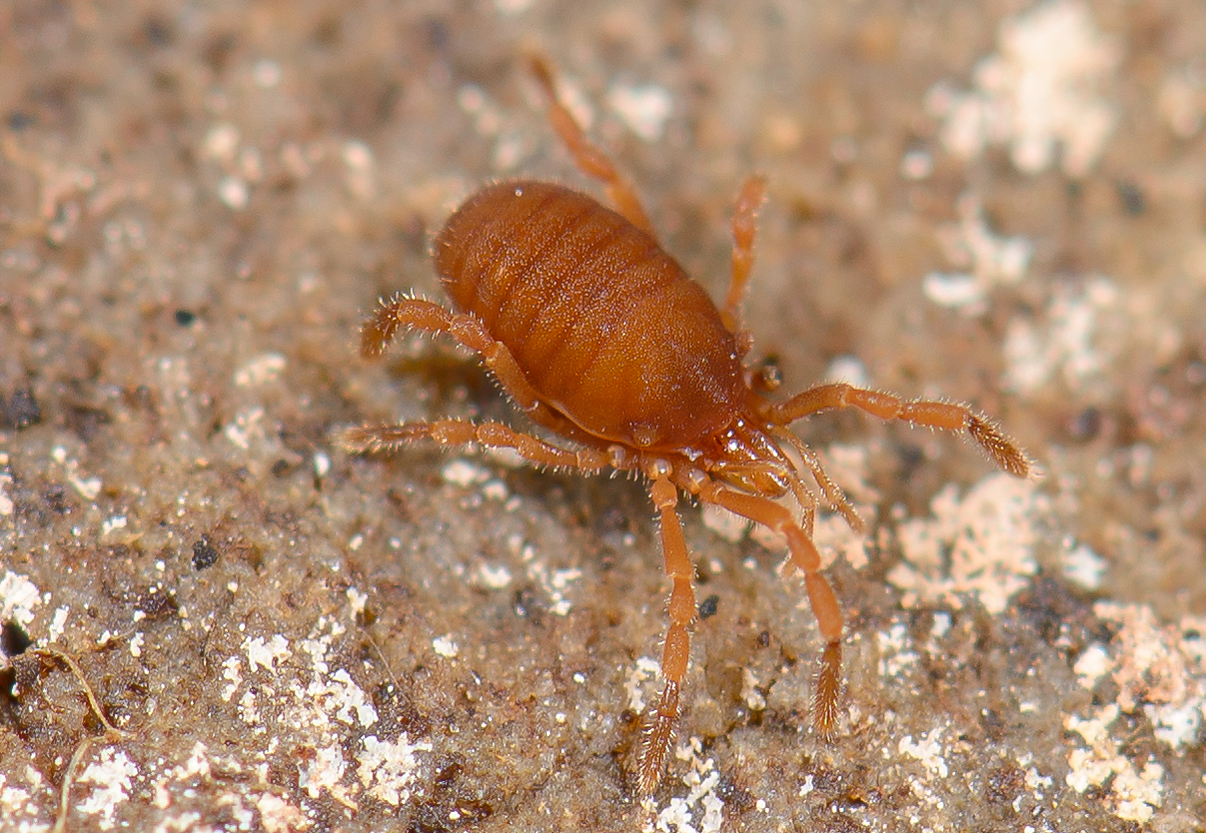
- Neosiro exilis

Scientific classification
- Kingdom: Animalia
- Phylum: Arthropoda
- Subphylum: Chelicerata
- Class: Arachnida
- Order: Opiliones
- Suborder: Cyphophthalmi
- Infraorder: Boreophthalmi
- Family: Sironidae
- Genus: Neosiro; Newell, 1943

Type species
- Neosiro kamiakensis Newell, 1943

Species
- See text

Diversity
- 5 species (plus 1 extinct)

= Neosiro =

Genus of harvestmen/daddy longlegs

Neosiro is a genus of mite harvestman in the family Sironidae. It is found in North America, only in the US

== Description ==
The genus Neosiro was described by Newell, 1943, with the type species Neosiro kamiakensis Newell, 1943. It was later placed in Siro before being restored to Neosiro.

== Species ==
These species belong to the genus Neosiro Newell, 1943:

- Subgenus Neosiro (Neosiro) Newell, 1943

- Neosiro boyerae (Giribet & Shear, 2010) – US (Washington, Oregon)
- Neosiro exilis (Hoffman, 1963) – US (Virginia, West Virginia, Maryland)
- Neosiro kamiakensis Newell, 1943 – US (Washington, Idaho)
- Neosiro ligiae (Giribet, 2017) – US (Oregon)
- Neosiro richarti (Benavides & Giribet, 2017) – US (Idaho)
- †Neosiro balticus (Dunlop & Mitov, 2011) (fossil, Baltic amber)

- Subgenus: Neosiro (Tillamooksiro) Karaman, 2022

- Neosiro martensi Karaman, 2022 – US (Oregon)

== Etymology ==
The genus is masculine, derived from Siro
