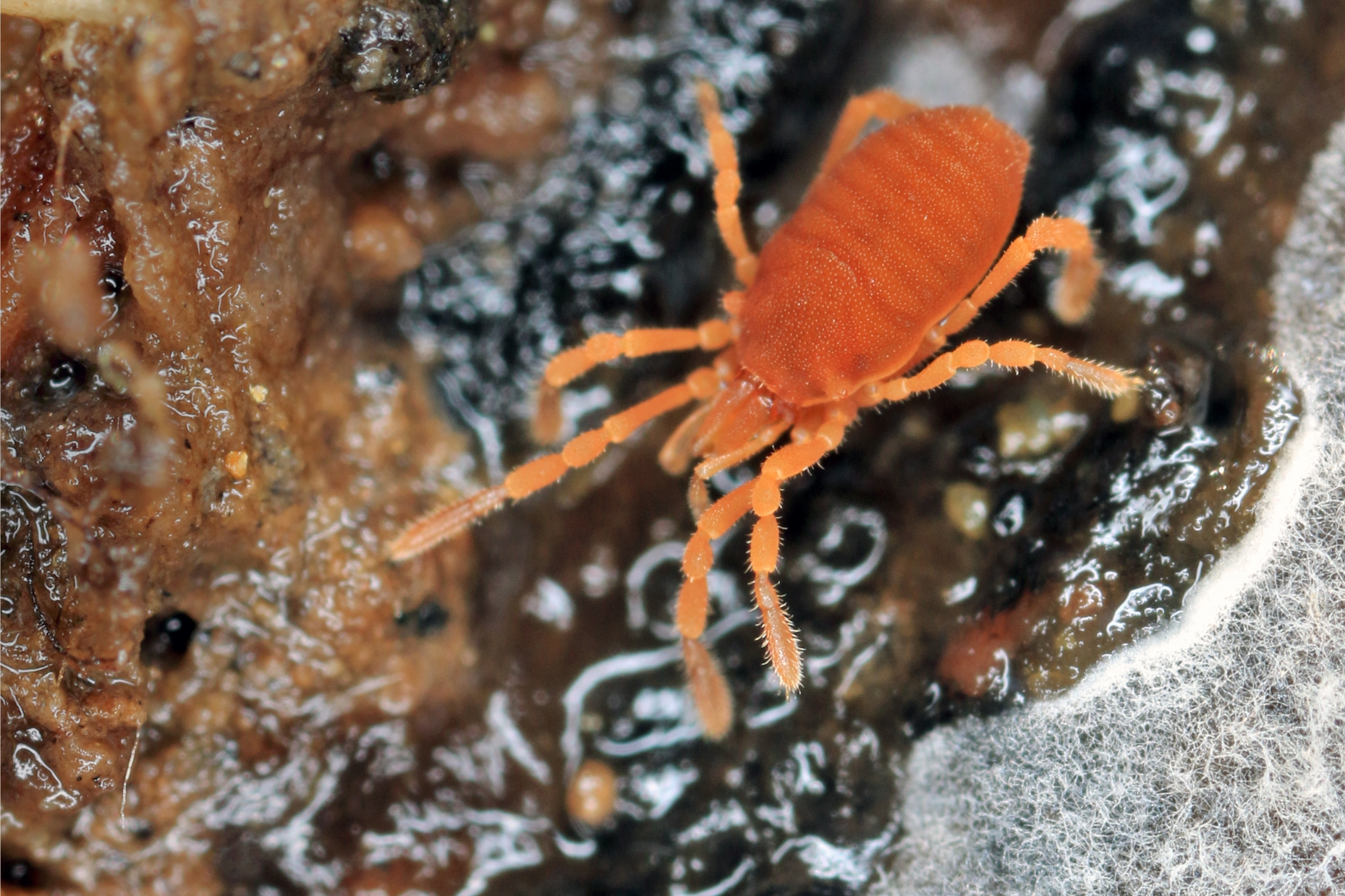

Scientific classification
- Kingdom: Animalia
- Phylum: Arthropoda
- Subphylum: Chelicerata
- Class: Arachnida
- Order: Opiliones
- Family: Sironidae
- Genus: Cyphophthalmus
- Species: C. duricorius

Binomial name
- Cyphophthalmus duricorius Joseph, 1868

Subspecies
- Cyphophthalmus duricorius duricorius Joseph, 1868; Cyphophthalmus duricorius bolei Hadži, 1973

= Cyphophthalmus duricorius =

Species of harvestman

Cyphophthalmus duricorius is a species of harvestman in the family Sironidae. It is found in Europe.

== Distribution ==
This species is present in Europe.Subspecies, Cyphophthalmus duricorius duricorius, has been recorded in Austria, Croatia, Slovenia, Bosnia and Herzegovina, and Italy. While the subspecies Cyphophthalmus duricorius bolei is endemic to Montenegro.
