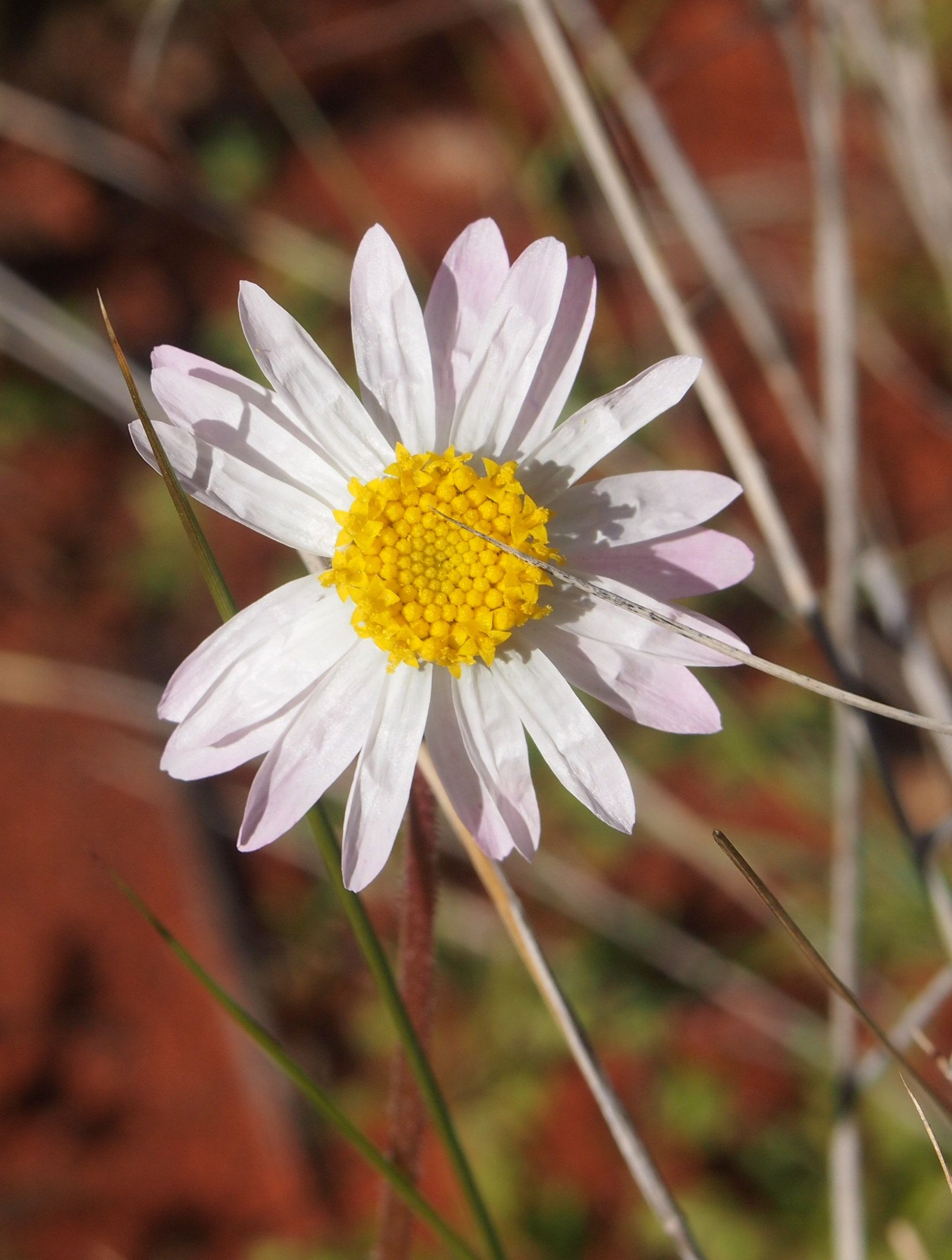

Scientific classification
- Kingdom: Plantae
- Clade: Tracheophytes
- Clade: Angiosperms
- Clade: Eudicots
- Clade: Asterids
- Order: Asterales
- Family: Asteraceae
- Genus: Lawrencella
- Species: L. davenportii

Binomial name
- Lawrencella davenportii (F.Muell.) Paul G.Wilson

= Lawrencella davenportii =

Sticky everlasting

Genus of flowering plants

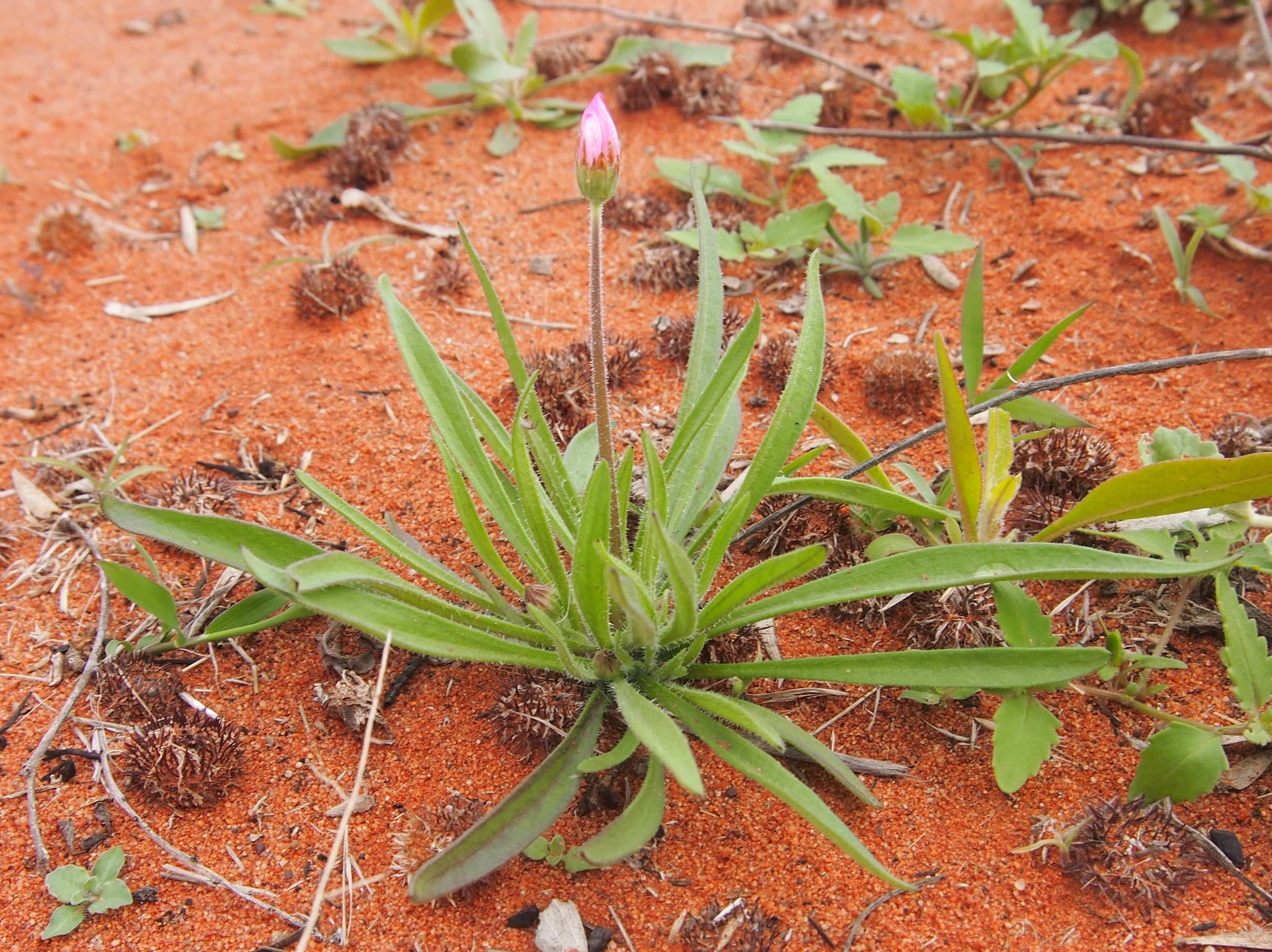
Habit

Lawrencella davenportii commonly known a sticky everlasting, is a flowering plant in the family Asteraceae and is endemic to Western Australia. It is a small, upright, annual herb with pale pink-whitish flowers.

== Description ==
Lawrencella davenportii is an upright, sticky annual herb with numerous, hairy erect stems. The leaves are linear, flat 0.3–14 cm (0.12–5.51 in) long, 0.2–1 cm (0.079–0.394 in) wide and form a cluster around the base of the plant. The pale pink-whitish flowers have a yellow centre and are borne at the end of stems up to 40 cm (16 in) long. Flowering occurs from June to October.

== Taxonomy and naming ==
This species was described in 1862 by Ferdinand von Mueller who gave it the name Helichrysum davenportii. In 1992 Paul G. Wilson changed the name to Lawrencella davenportii and the description was published in Nuytsia.

== Distribution and habitat ==
Sticky everlasting grows in red sand dunes or clay, often in open mallee or mulga locations in South Australia and Western Australia.
