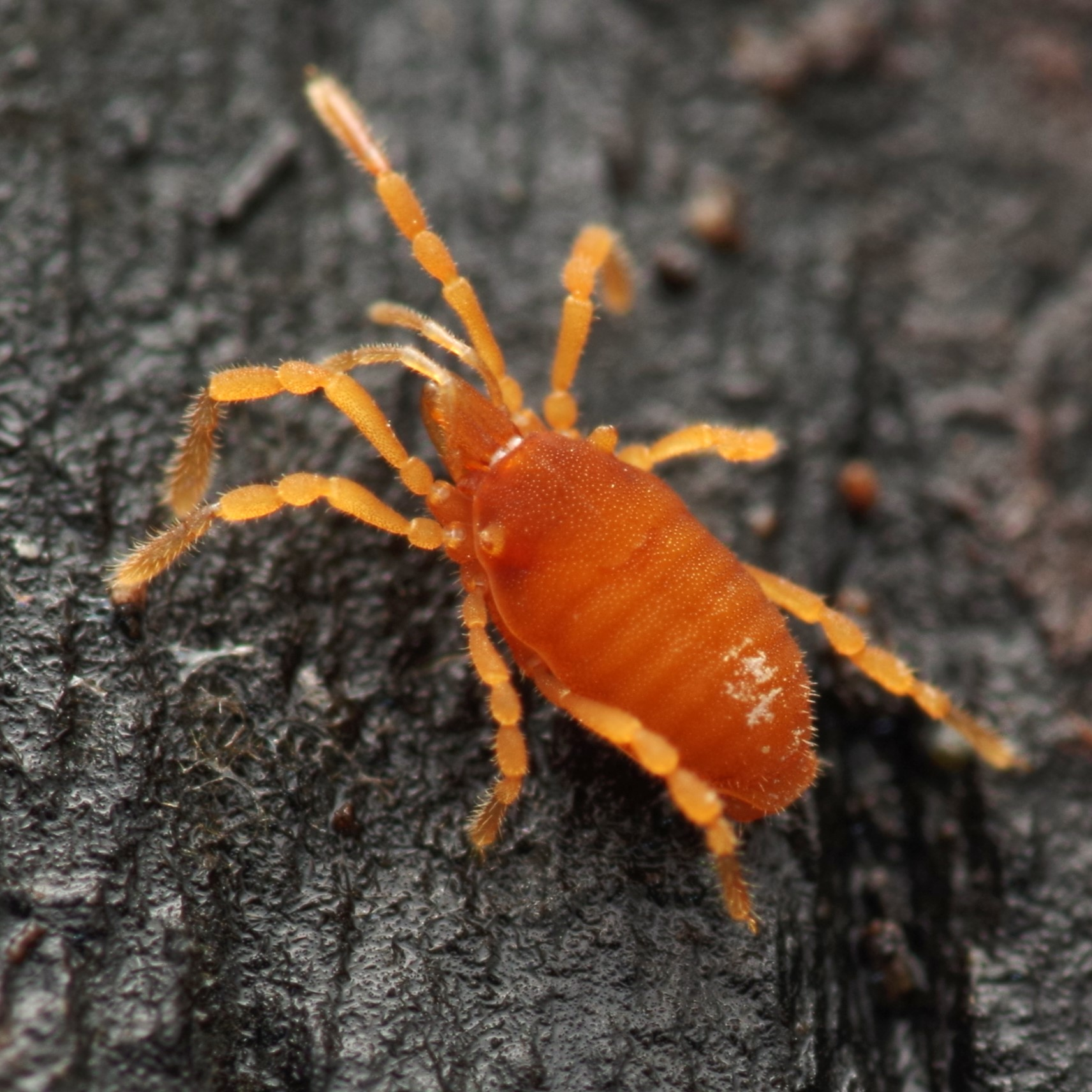
- Siro rubens

Scientific classification
- Domain: Eukaryota
- Kingdom: Animalia
- Phylum: Arthropoda
- Subphylum: Chelicerata
- Class: Arachnida
- Order: Opiliones
- Suborder: Cyphophthalmi
- Infraorder: Boreophthalmi
- Family: Sironidae; Simon, 1879

Diversity
- 10 genera, > 60 species
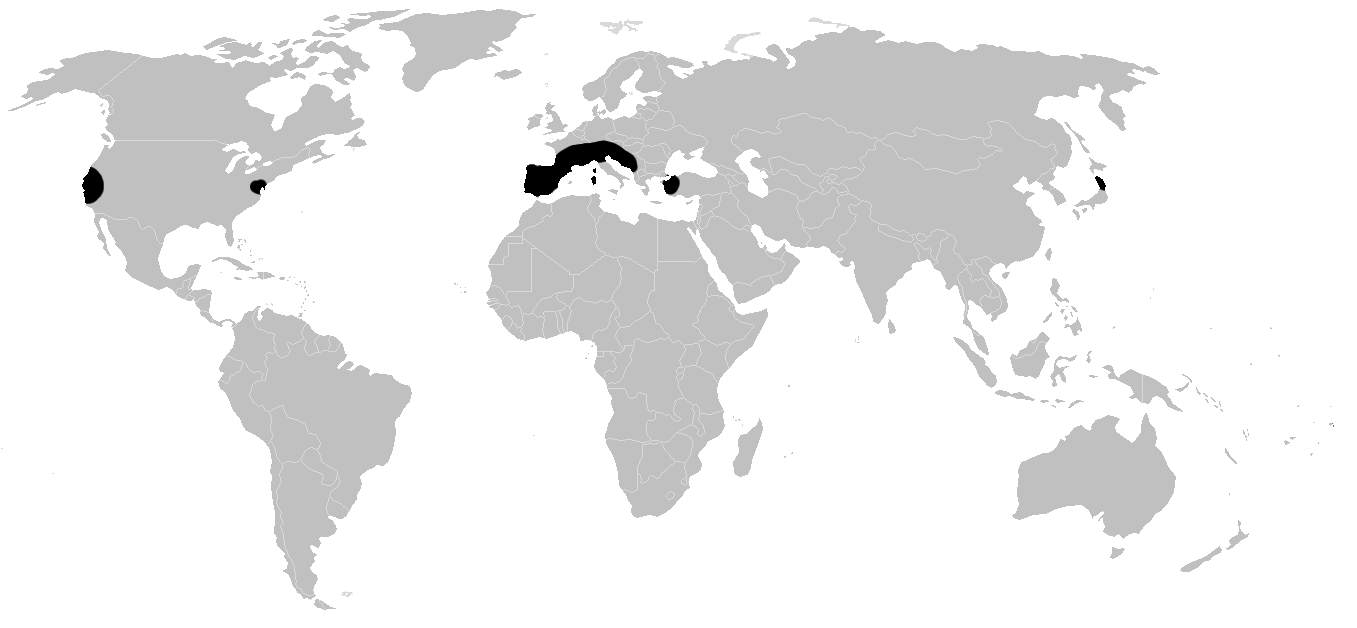

Synonyms
- Sironides

= Sironidae =

Sironidae Temporal range: Palaeogene–present

Family of harvestmen/daddy longlegs

The Sironidae are a family of harvestmen with more than 60 described species.

The family shows a Laurasian distribution, with most species found in temperate Europe and the west coast of North America. The only exception is Suzukielus sauteri from Japan.

== Name ==
Siro is the Latinized form of the French name "Ciron".

== Species ==
Below is from "World Catalog of Opiliones" (as of early 2024, after transfer of Parasiro). See also "List of Cyphophthalmi species"List of Cyphophthalmi species#Boreophthalmi

- Arhesiro Karaman, 2022

- Arhesiro clousi (Giribet & Shear, 2010) – USA (Oregon)
- Arhesiro sonoma (Shear, 1980) – USA (California)

- Cyphophthalmus Joseph, 1869 (mostly Balkan)

- Cyphophthalmus beschkovi (Mitov, 1994) – Bulgaria
- Cyphophtalmus bithynicus (Gruber, 1969) – Turkey
- Cyphophthalmus conocephalus Karaman, 2009 – Bosnia and Herzegovina
- Cyphophthalmus corfuanus (Kratochvíl, 1938) – Greece
- Cyphophtalmus duricorius Joseph, 1868 – Austria, Albania, Bosnia-Herzegovina, Croatia, Slovenia, Italy
- Cyphophtalmus eratoae (Juberthie, 1968) – Greece
- Cyphophthalmus ere Karaman, 2008 – Serbia
- Cyphophthalmus gjorgjevici (Hadzi, 1933) – North Macedonia
- Cyphophthalmus gordani Karaman, 2009 – Montenegro
- Cyphophthalmus hlavaci Karaman, 2009 – Croatia
- Cyphophthalmus klisurae (Hadzi, 1973) – Kosovo - cave
- Cyphophthalmus kratochvili Karaman, 2009 – Croatia
- Cyphophthalmus markoi Karaman, 2008 – (?) Serbia
- Cyphophthalmus martensi Karaman, 2009 – Montenegro
- Cyphophthalmus minutus (Kratochvíl, 1938) – Montenegro, Croatia- cave
- Cyphophthalmus montenegrinus (Hadzi, 1973) – Montenegro
- Cyphophthalmus neretvanus Karaman, 2009 – Croatia
- Cyphophthalmus noctiphilus (Kratochvíl, 1940) – Croatia - cave
- Cyphophthalmus nonveilleri Karaman, 2008 – Serbia - cave
- Cyphophthalmus ognjenovici Karaman, 2009 – Bosnia and Herzegovina
- Cyphophthalmus ohridanus (Hadzi, 1973) – North Macedonia - cave
- Cyphophthalmus paradoxus (Kratochvíl, 1958) – Bulgaria
- Cyphophthalmus paragamiani Karaman, 2009 – Greece
- Cyphophthalmus rumijae Karaman, 2009 – Montenegro
- Cyphophthalmus serbicus (Hadzi, 1973) – Serbia
- Cyphophthalmus silhavyi (Kratochvíl, 1938) – Croatia - cave
- Cyphophthalmus solentiensis Dreszer, Raða & Giribet, 2015 – Croatia
- Cyphophthalmus teyrovskyi (Kratochvíl, 1938) – Croatia - cave
- Cyphophthalmus thracicus Karaman, 2009 – Bulgaria
- Cyphophthalmus trebinjanus Karaman, 2009 – Bosnia and Herzegovina
- Cyphophthalmus yalovensis (Gruber, 1969) – Turkey
- Cyphophthalmus zetae Karaman, 2009 – Montenegro

- Holosiro Ewing, 1923

- Holosiro acaroides Ewing, 1923 – USA (Washington, Oregon, California)
- Holosiro calaveras (Giribet & Shear, 2010) – USA (California)
- Holosiro ewingi Karaman, 2022 – USA (Oregon)
- Holosiro shasta (Giribet & Shear, 2010) – USA (California)

- Iberosiro de Bivort & Giribet, 2004

- Iberosiro distylos de Bivort & Giribet, 2004 – Portugal - cave
- Iberosiro rosae Giribet, Merino-Sáinz & Benavides, 2017 – Spain

- Neosiro Newell, 1943

- Neosiro boyerae (Giribet & Shear, 2010) – USA (Washington, Oregon)
- Neosiro exilis (Hoffman, 1963) – USA (Virginia, West Virginia, Maryland)
- Neosiro kamiakensis Newell, 1943 – USA (Washington, Idaho)
- Neosiro ligiae (Giribet, 2017) – USA (Oregon)
- Neosiro martensi Karaman, 2022 – USA (Oregon)
- Neosiro richarti (Benavides & Giribet, 2017) – USA (Idaho)
- [Also †Neosiro balticus (Dunlop & Mitov, 2011) (fossil, Baltic amber)]

- Odontosiro Juberthie, 1961

- Odontosiro lusitanicus Juberthie, 1961 – Portugal, Spain

- Paramiopsalis Juberthie, 1962

- Paramiopsalis anadonae Giribet, Merino-Sáinz & Benavides, 2017 – Spain
- Paramiopsalis eduardoi Murienne & Giribet, 2009 – Spain
- Paramiopsalis ramblae Benavides & Giribet, 2017 – Spain
- Paramiopsalis ramulosa Juberthie, 1962 – Spain

- Siro Latreille, 1796 (western Europe, North America)

- Siro carpaticus Rafalski, 1956 – Poland, Slovakia
- Siro crassus Novak & Giribet, 2006 – Slovenia
- Siro franzi Karaman & Raspotnig, 2022 – Austria
- Siro ozimeci Karaman, 2022 – Croatia
- Siro rubens Latreille, 1804 – France
- Siro valleorum Chemini, 1990 – Italy
- †Siro platypedibus Dunlop & Giribet, 2003 (fossil, Bitterfield amber from Bitterfeld, Germany)

- Suzukielus Juberthie, 1970

- Suzukielus sauteri (Roewer, 1916) – Japan

The following genus is no longer included in Sironidae, but also not yet included in any new family:

- Marwe Shear, 1985 (Kenya)

- Marwe coarctata Shear, 1985
