= Arhesiro clousi =

Scientific classification
- Domain: Eukaryota
- Kingdom: Animalia
- Phylum: Arthropoda
- Subphylum: Chelicerata
- Class: Arachnida
- Order: Opiliones
- Family: Sironidae
- Genus: Arhesiro
- Species: A. clousi

Binomial name
- Arhesiro clousi (Giribet & Shear, 2010)

Synonyms
- Including: Siro clousi Giribet & Shear, 2010

Species of arachnids

Arhesiro clousi is a species of mite harvestman in the family Sironidae (as of 2023). It is found in North America, specifically US, Oregon, Lincoln County.

== Description ==
The genus Arhesiro was described by Karaman, 2022, with the type species Siro clousi Giribet & Shear, 2010. Before then, both this and Arhesiro sonoma were previously placed in Siro.
