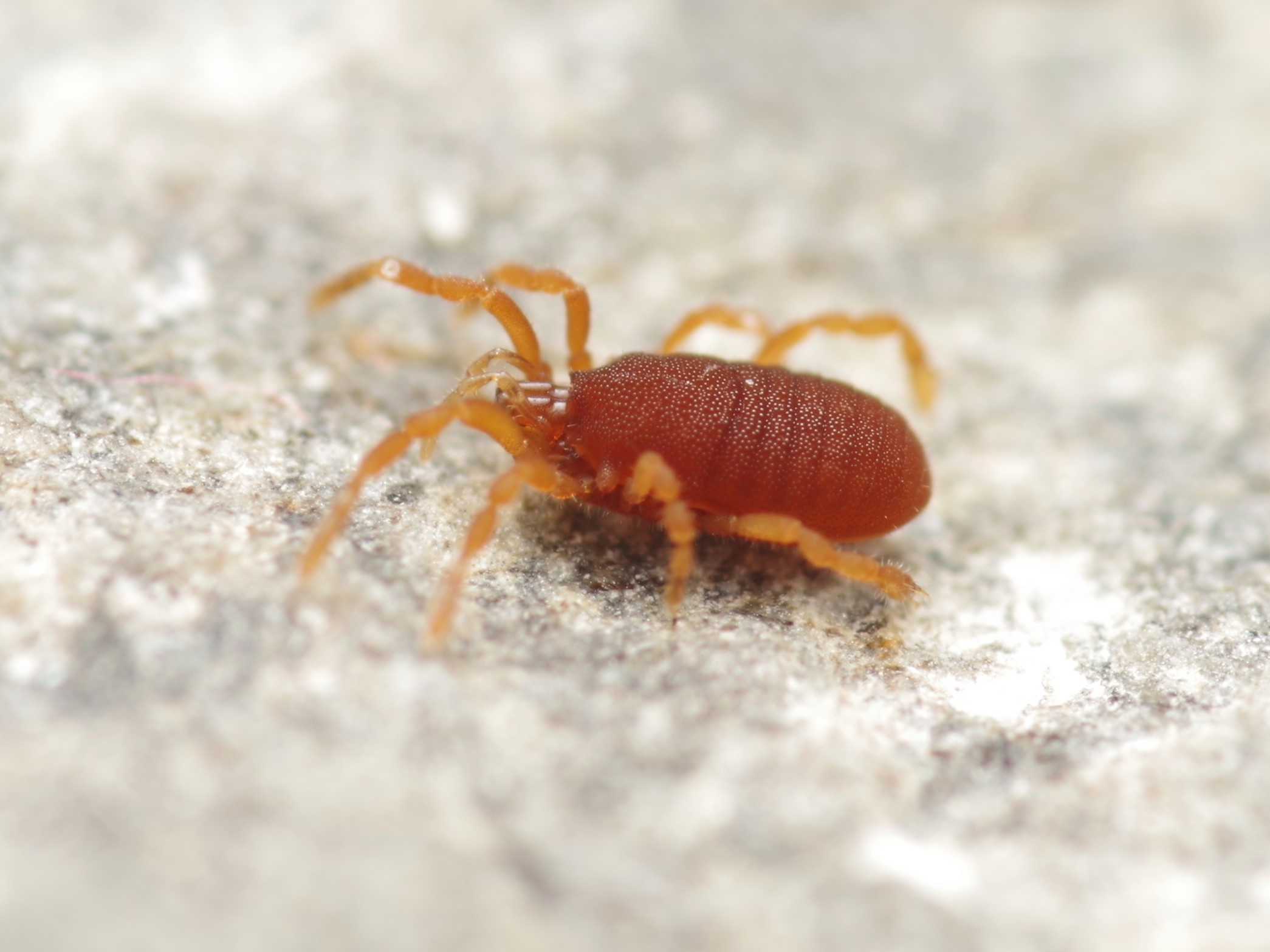
- Ebrosiro coiffaiti (male)

Scientific classification
- Kingdom: Animalia
- Phylum: Arthropoda
- Subphylum: Chelicerata
- Class: Arachnida
- Order: Opiliones
- Suborder: Cyphophthalmi
- Family: Parasironidae
- Genus: Ebrosiro; Hansen & Sørensen, 1904

Type species
- Ebrosiro coiffaiti (Juberthie, 1956)

Species
- See text

Diversity
- 1 species

Synonyms
- Parasiro coiffaiti Juberthie, 1956

= Ebrosiro coiffaiti =

Species of harvestman/daddy longlegs

Ebrosiro is a genus of harvestmen belonging to the family Parasironidae, it is monotypic with one described species. It is found in Southern Europe.

== Description ==
The genus Ebrosiro was described by Karaman, Mitov & Snegovaya, 2024, with the type species Ebrosiro coiffaiti (Juberthie, 1956), revised from its protonym of Parasiro coiffaiti Juberthie, 1956.

== Species ==
This species belong to the genus Ebrosiro:

- Ebrosiro Karaman, Mitov & Snegovaya, 2024

- Ebrosiro coiffaiti (Juberthie, 1956) – France/Spain

== Etymology ==
The genus is masculine.
