= Cyphophthalmus conocephalus =

Scientific classification
- Kingdom: Animalia
- Phylum: Arthropoda
- Subphylum: Chelicerata
- Class: Arachnida
- Order: Opiliones
- Family: Sironidae
- Genus: Cyphophthalmus
- Species: C. conocephalus

Binomial name
- Cyphophthalmus conocephalus Karaman, 2009

Species of harvestman

Cyphophthalmus conocephalus is a species of harvestman in the family Sironidae found in Bosnia and Herzegovina.

== Distribution ==
This species is endemic to Bosnia and Herzegovina.
