= Odontosiro =

Scientific classification
- Domain: Eukaryota
- Kingdom: Animalia
- Phylum: Arthropoda
- Subphylum: Chelicerata
- Class: Arachnida
- Order: Opiliones
- Family: Sironidae
- Genus: Odontosiro; Juberthie, 1961

Genus of spiders

Odontosiro is a genus of harvestmen belonging to the family Sironidae.

Species:

- Odontosiro lusitanicus Juberthie, 1961
