= Parasiro corsicus =

Scientific classification
- Domain: Eukaryota
- Kingdom: Animalia
- Phylum: Arthropoda
- Subphylum: Chelicerata
- Class: Arachnida
- Order: Opiliones
- Suborder: Cyphophthalmi
- Family: Parasironidae
- Genus: Parasiro; Hansen & Sørensen, 1904

Type species
- Cyphophthalmus corsicus Simon, 1872

Species
- See text

Diversity
- 1 species

Species of harvestman/daddy longlegs

Parasiro is a genus of harvestmen belonging to the family Parasironidae with one described species. It is found in Southwestern Europe.

== Description ==
The genus Parasiro was described by Hansen & Sørensen 1904, with the type species Cyphophthalmus corsicus Simon, 1872. The genus included three species for many years, but subsequently has been reduced back to just the single type species.

== Species ==
This species belong to the genus Parasiro:

- Parasiro Hansen & Sørensen, 1904

- Parasiro corsicus (Simon, 1872) – France (Corsica)

== Etymology ==
The genus is masculine.
