= Holosiro ewingi =

Scientific classification
- Domain: Eukaryota
- Kingdom: Animalia
- Phylum: Arthropoda
- Subphylum: Chelicerata
- Class: Arachnida
- Order: Opiliones
- Family: Sironidae
- Genus: Holosiro
- Species: H. ewingi

Binomial name
- Holosiro ewingi Karaman, 2022

Species of harvestman/daddy longlegs

Holosiro ewingi is a species of mite harvestman in the family Sironidae. It is found in North America, specifically Oregon near Corvallis.

== Description ==
The species Holosiro ewingi was described by Stanko Karaman, 2022.
