= Cyphophthalmus thracicus =

Scientific classification
- Kingdom: Animalia
- Phylum: Arthropoda
- Subphylum: Chelicerata
- Class: Arachnida
- Order: Opiliones
- Family: Sironidae
- Genus: Cyphophthalmus
- Species: C. thracicus

Binomial name
- Cyphophthalmus thracicus Karaman, 2009

Species of harvestman

Cyphophthalmus thracicus is a species of harvestman in the family Sironidae found in Bulgaria.

== Distribution ==
This species is endemic to Bulgaria.
