= Neosiro boyerae =

Scientific classification
- Domain: Eukaryota
- Kingdom: Animalia
- Phylum: Arthropoda
- Subphylum: Chelicerata
- Class: Arachnida
- Order: Opiliones
- Family: Sironidae
- Genus: Neosiro
- Species: N. boyerae

Binomial name
- Neosiro boyerae Giribet & Shear, 2010

Synonyms
- Including: Siro boyerae Giribet & Shear, 2010

Species of harvestman/daddy longlegs

Neosiro boyerae is a species of mite harvestman in the family Sironidae. It is found in North America, specifically USA, Oregon, Lincoln County.

== Description ==
The species Neosiro boyerae was described by Giribet & Shear, 2010. Before then, it was previously placed in Siro.
