= Cyphophthalmus ere =

Scientific classification
- Kingdom: Animalia
- Phylum: Arthropoda
- Subphylum: Chelicerata
- Class: Arachnida
- Order: Opiliones
- Family: Sironidae
- Genus: Cyphophthalmus
- Species: C. ere

Binomial name
- Cyphophthalmus ere Karaman, 2008

Species of harvestman

Cyphophthalmus ere is a species of harvestman in the family Sironidae found in Serbia.

== Distribution ==
This species is endemic to Serbia.
