= Cyphophthalmus hlavaci =

Scientific classification
- Kingdom: Animalia
- Phylum: Arthropoda
- Subphylum: Chelicerata
- Class: Arachnida
- Order: Opiliones
- Family: Sironidae
- Genus: Cyphophthalmus
- Species: C. hlavaci

Binomial name
- Cyphophthalmus hlavaci Karaman, 2009

Species of arachnid

Cyphophthalmus hlavaci is a species of harvestman in the family Sironidae found in Croatia.

== Distribution ==
This species is endemic to Croatia.
