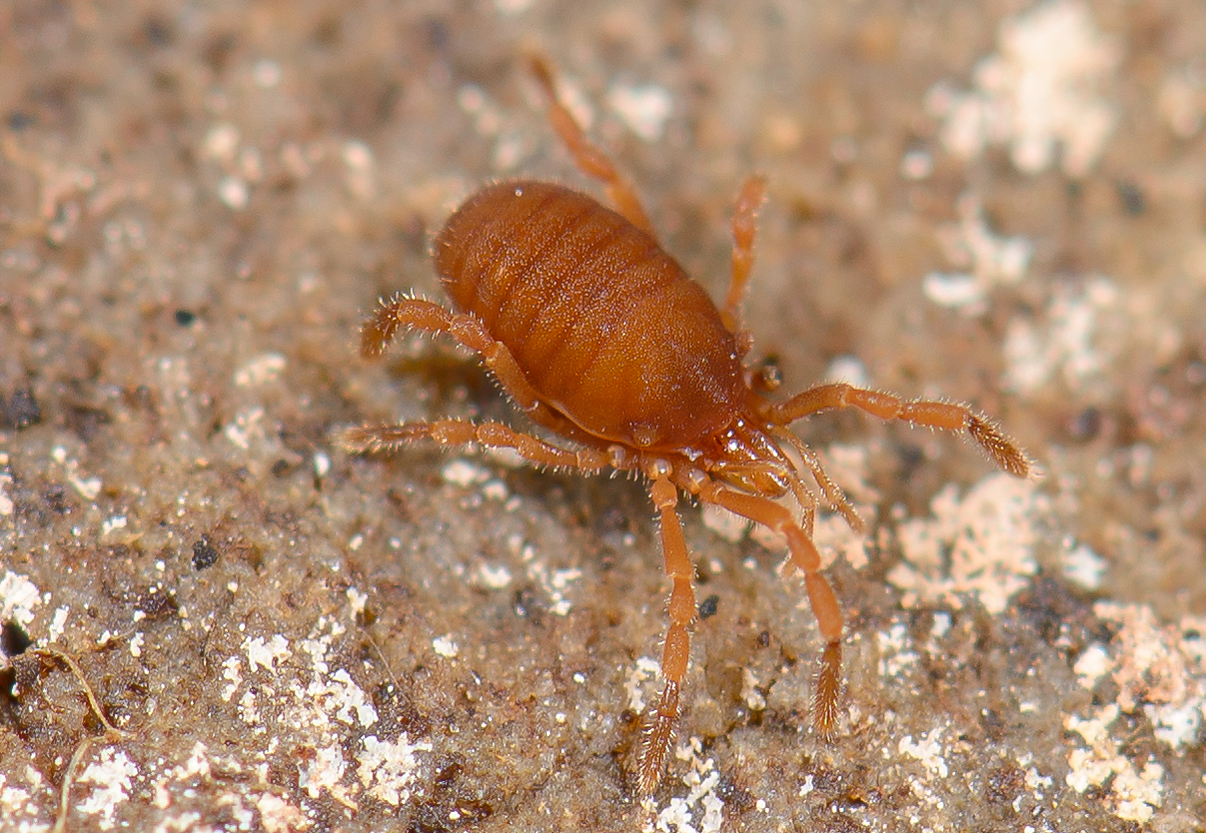

Scientific classification
- Kingdom: Animalia
- Phylum: Arthropoda
- Subphylum: Chelicerata
- Class: Arachnida
- Order: Opiliones
- Family: Sironidae
- Genus: Neosiro
- Species: N. exilis

Binomial name
- Neosiro exilis (Hoffman, 1963)

Synonyms
- Including: Siro exilis Hoffman, 1963

= Neosiro exilis =

Species of harvestman/daddy longlegs

Neosiro exilis is a species of mite harvestman in the family Sironidae. It is found in North America.

The species was first described by Hoffman, 1963. It was previously placed in the genus Siro.
