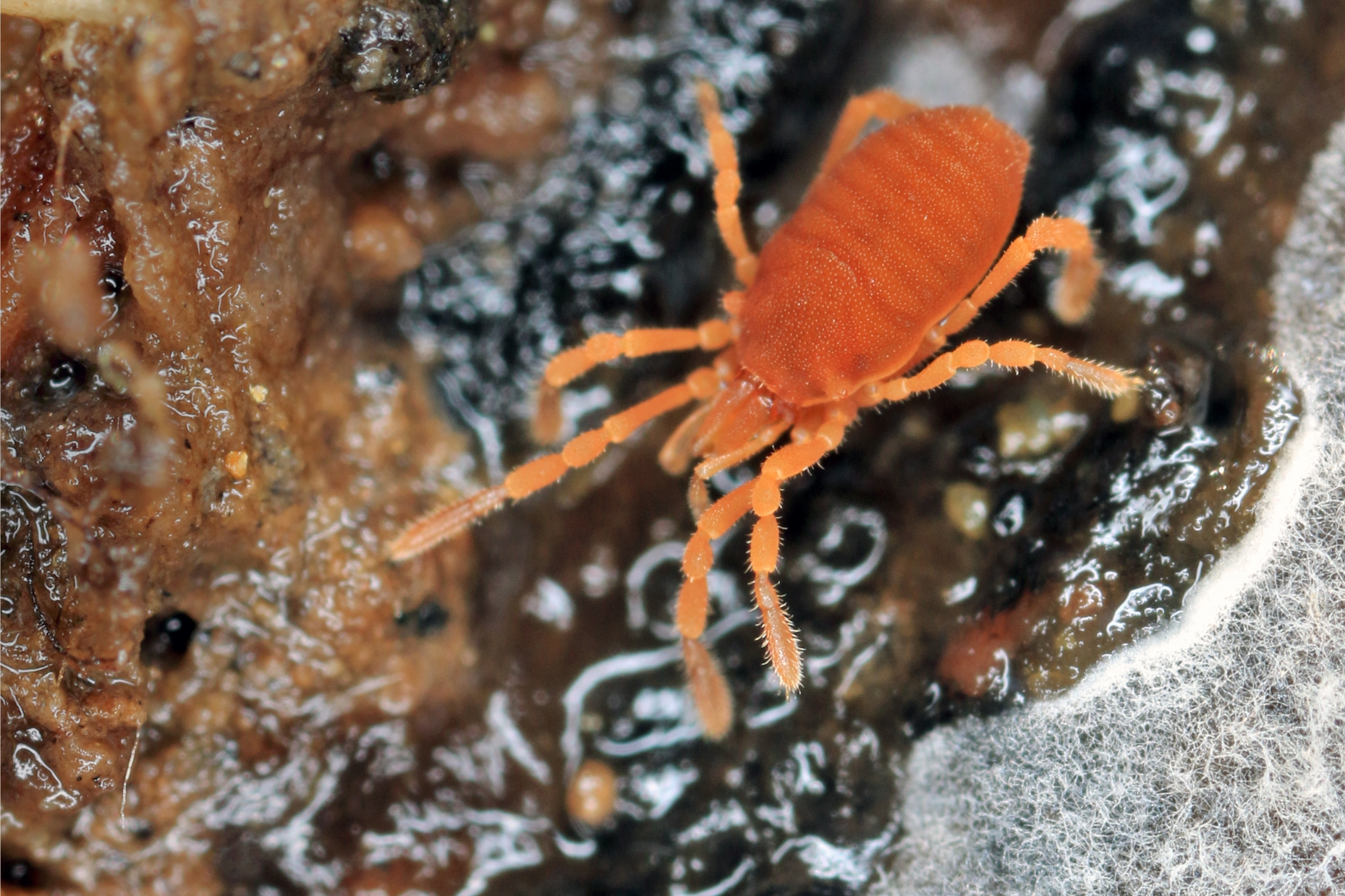
- Cyphophtalmus duricorius

Scientific classification
- Kingdom: Animalia
- Phylum: Arthropoda
- Subphylum: Chelicerata
- Class: Arachnida
- Order: Opiliones
- Suborder: Cyphophthalmi
- Infraorder: Boreophthalmi
- Family: Sironidae
- Genus: Cyphophthalmus; Joseph, 1869

Type species
- Cyphophthalmus duricorius Joseph, 1869

Synonyms
- Including: Tranteeva Kratochvil, 1958

= Cyphophthalmus =

Genus of harvestmen/daddy longlegs

Cyphophthalmus is a genus of harvestmen belonging to the family Sironidae. It is found in Europe notably with several species in the Balkans and Turkey.

== Description ==
The genus Cyphophthalmus was described by Gustav Joseph in 1869, with the type species Cyphophthalmus duricorius.

== Species ==
Cyphophthalmus beschkovi Mitov, 1994 (Bulgaria)

Cyphophthalmus bithynicus Gruber, 1969 (Türkiye)

Cyphophthalmus corfuanus Kratochvil, 1938 (Corfu, Greece)

Cyphophthalmus conocephalus Karaman, 2009 (Bosnia and Hercegovina)

Cyphophthalmus duricorius Joseph, 1868 (Austria, Bosnia and Herzegovina, Croatia, Italy, Montenegro, Slovenia)

Cyphophthalmus eratoae Juberthie, 1968 (Greece)

Cyphophthalmus ere Karaman, 2008 (Serbia)

Cyphophthalmus gjorgjevici Hadži, 1933 (North Macedonia)

Cyphophthalmus gordani Karaman, 2009 (Montenegro)

Cyphophthalmus hlavaci Karaman, 2009 (Croatia)

Cyphophthalmus klisurae Hadži, 1973 (Serbia)

Cyphophthalmus kratochvili Karaman, 2009 (Croatia)

Cyphophthalmus markoi Karaman, 2008 (North Macedonia)

Cyphophthalmus martensi Karaman, 2009 (Montenegro)

Cyphophthalmus minutus Kratochvíl, 1938 (Croatia and Montenegro)

Cyphophthalmus montenegrinus Hadži, 1973 (Montenegro)

Cyphophthalmus neretvanus Karaman, 2009 (Croatia)

Cyphophthalmus noctiphilus Kratochvíl, 1940 (Croatia)

Cyphophthalmus nonveilleri Karaman, 2008 (western Serbia)

Cyphophthalmus ognjenovici Karaman, 2009 (Bosnia and Hercegovina)

Cyphophthalmus ohridanus Hadži, 1973 (North Macedonia)

Cyphophthalmus paradoxus Kratochvíl, 1958 (Bulgaria)

Cyphophthalmus paragamiani Karaman, 2009 (Greece)

Cyphophthalmus rumijae Karaman, 2009 (Montenegro)

Cyphophthalmus serbicus Hadži, 1973 (Serbia)

Cyphophthalmus silhavyi Kratochvíl, 1938 (Croatia)

Cyphophthalmus solentiensis Dreszer, Raa & Giribet, 2025 (Croatia)

Cyphophthalmus teyrovskyi Kratochvíl, 1938 (Croatia and Montenegro)

Cyphophthalmus thracicus Karaman, 2009 (Bulgaria)

Cyphophthalmus trebinjanus Karaman, 2009 (Bosnia and Herzegovina)

Cyphophthalmus yalovensis Gruber, 1969 (Türkiye)

Cyphophthalmus zetae Karaman, 2009 (Montenegro)

== Etymology ==
The genus is feminine.
