= Johan Erik Vesti Boas =

Danish zoologist (1855–1935)

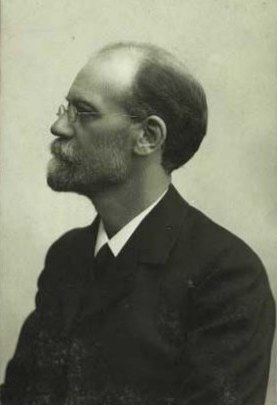
Johan Erik Vesti Boas before 1933 by Frederik Riise.

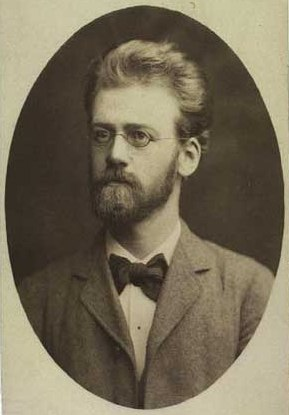
Johan Erik Vesti Boas before 1895 by Harald Paetz.

Johan Erik Vesti Boas (2 July 1855 – 25 January 1935), also J. E. V. Boas, was a Danish zoologist and a disciple of Carl Gegenbaur and Steenstrup. During the beginning and end of his career, Johan Erik Vesti Boas worked at the Zoological Museum of Copenhagen. However, during an intervening period of 35 years, Boas worked with the Veterinary and Agricultural University of Copenhagen, because Boas had felt ignored at the appointment of the museum curator post, which went, instead, to G. M. R. Levinsen (q.v.).

- Trizocheles boasi Forest, 1987
- Paromolopsis boasi
