= Cyphophthalmus gordani =

Scientific classification
- Kingdom: Animalia
- Phylum: Arthropoda
- Subphylum: Chelicerata
- Class: Arachnida
- Order: Opiliones
- Family: Sironidae
- Genus: Cyphophthalmus
- Species: C. gordani

Binomial name
- Cyphophthalmus gordani Karaman, 2009

Species of harvestman

Cyphophthalmus gordani is a species of harvestman in the family Sironidae. It is found in Montenegro.

== Distribution ==
This species is endemic to Montenegro.
