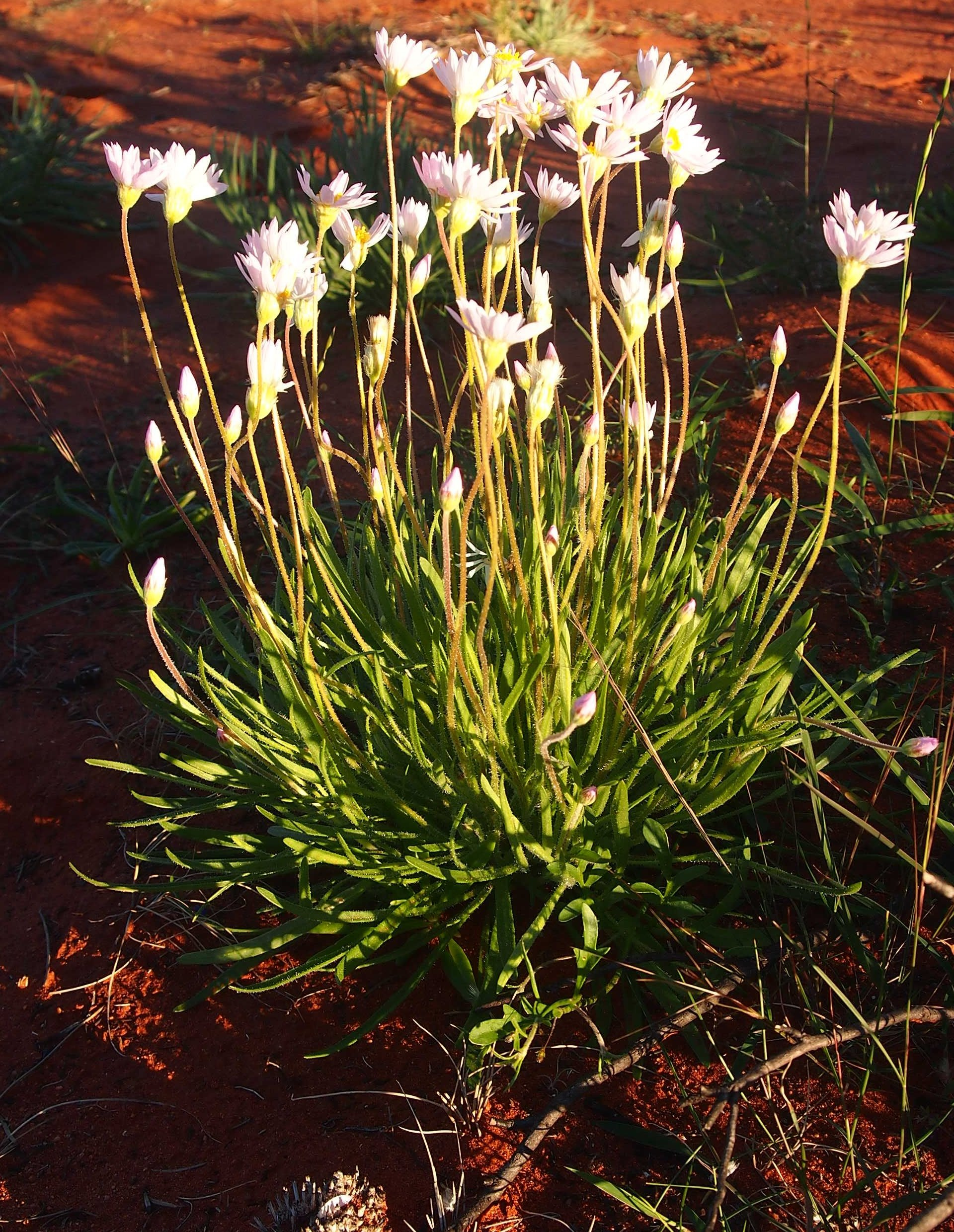
- Lawrencella davenportii
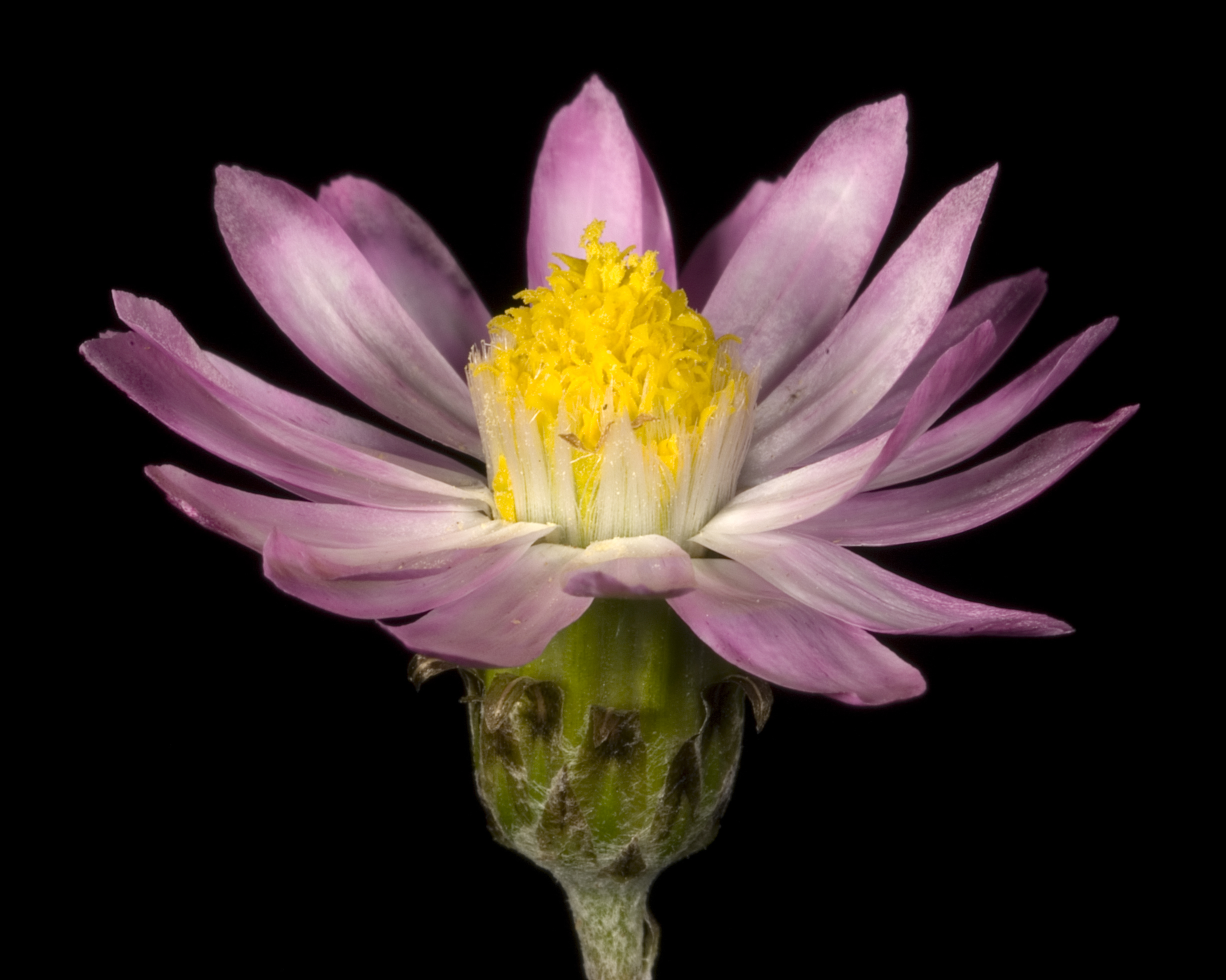
- Lawrencella rosea

Scientific classification
- Kingdom: Plantae
- Clade: Tracheophytes
- Clade: Angiosperms
- Clade: Eudicots
- Clade: Asterids
- Order: Asterales
- Family: Asteraceae
- Subfamily: Asteroideae
- Tribe: Gnaphalieae
- Genus: Lawrencella; Lindl.

Type species
- Lawrencella rosea Lindl.

= Lawrencella =

Genus of flowering plants

Lawrencella is a genus of flowering plants in the family Asteraceae endemic to Australia.

The genus comprises two species: Lawrencella davenportii with a distribution in arid regions of Western Australia, The Northern Territory, and South Australia and Lawrencella rosea which is restricted to the south-west of Western Australia.

Both species are annual herbs growing to approximately 40 cm in height. The strap-shaped leaves up to 10 cm in length are covered with short hairs. Flower heads are produced on stalks well above the main leaves, and have yellow centres with pink or occasionally white bracts. Flowering usually occurs in spring or summer in years with good cool season rain.

Both species have horticultural potential for their colourful flower displays and their drought hardiness. However, difficulties in germination of seed have restricted their widespread cultivation to date.

The genus Lawrencella is closely related to two other Australian genera, Schoenia and Bellida.
