= Cyphophthalmus markoi =

Scientific classification
- Kingdom: Animalia
- Phylum: Arthropoda
- Subphylum: Chelicerata
- Class: Arachnida
- Order: Opiliones
- Family: Sironidae
- Genus: Cyphophthalmus
- Species: C. markoi

Binomial name
- Cyphophthalmus markoi Karaman, 2008

Species of arachnid

Cyphophthalmus markoi is a species of harvestman in the family Sironidae found in North Macedonia.

== Distribution ==
This species is endemic to North Macedonia.
