= Paramiopsalis =

Scientific classification
- Domain: Eukaryota
- Kingdom: Animalia
- Phylum: Arthropoda
- Subphylum: Chelicerata
- Class: Arachnida
- Order: Opiliones
- Suborder: Cyphophthalmi
- Infraorder: Boreophthalmi
- Family: Sironidae
- Genus: Paramiopsalis; Juberthie, 1962

Type species
- Paramiopsalis ramulosus Juberthie, 1962

Species
- See text

Diversity
- 4 species

Genus of spiders

Paramiopsalis is a genus of harvestmen belonging to the family Sironidae. All species are found in Spain.

== Description ==
The genus Paramiopsalis was described by Juberthie, 1962, with the type species Paramiopsalis ramulosus Juberthie, 1962.

== Species ==
These species belong to the genus Paramiopsalis:

- Paramiopsalis anadonae Giribet, Merino-Sáinz & Benavides, 2017 – Spain
- Paramiopsalis eduardoi Murienne & Giribet, 2009 – Spain
- Paramiopsalis ramblae Benavides & Giribet, 2017 – Spain
- Paramiopsalis ramulosa Juberthie, 1962 – Spain

== Etymology ==
The genus is feminine.
