= Neosiro kamiakensis =

Scientific classification
- Kingdom: Animalia
- Phylum: Arthropoda
- Subphylum: Chelicerata
- Class: Arachnida
- Order: Opiliones
- Family: Sironidae
- Genus: Neosiro
- Species: N. kamiakensis

Binomial name
- Neosiro kamiakensis (Newell, 1943)

Synonyms
- Including: Siro kamiakensis Hoffman, 1963

Species of harvestman/daddy longlegs

Neosiro kamiakensis is a species of mite harvestman in the family Sironidae. It is found in North America.

== Description ==
The species Neosiro kamiakensis was described by Newell, 1943. It was previously placed in Siro.
