= William Sørensen =

Danish zoologist 1848-1916

William Emil Sørensen
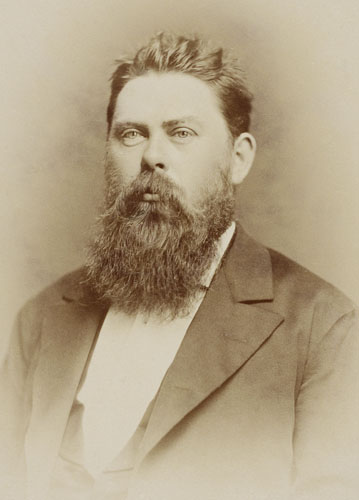
- Born: 9 April 1848; Hyllested, Grenå
- Died: 29 June 1916 (aged 68); Copenhagen
- Resting place: Solbjerg Park Cemetery, Frederiksberg
- Education: University of Copenhagen (Dr.Phil.)
- Awards: Royal Danish Academy of Sciences, 1891
- Scientific career
- Fields: Zoology; Physiology; Arachnology; Bioacoustics
- Workplaces: Danish School of Education; Copenhagen Zoo
- Thesis: Om Lydorganer hos Fiske (On sound organs in fishes) (1884)
- Doctoral advisor: J. C. Schiødte
- Author abbrev. (zoology): Sørensen

William Emil Sørensen was a Danish zoologist. He made significant contributions especially to arachnid morphology and systematics, but was also among the first to systematically study vocalisations in fishes. Despite his scientific qualifications, he never assumed a university position, undoubtedly linked to his unusually direct critique of his peers, most notably the leading Danish zoologist at the time, Japetus Steenstrup. Eventually, he was employed at the Danish School of Education and became member of the Royal Danish Academy of Sciences in 1891. Sørensen was a life-long friend of the later Nobel-laureate August Krogh, who considered Sørensen "my teacher into scientific method".

== Early life ==
William Sørensen was born 9 April 1848 in the village Hyllested, near Grenå, Djursland, son of Jutta Caroline Cæcilie Hasselriis and Pastor Søren Møller Sørensen. In 1860 he moved with his parents to Esbønderup north of Copenhagen and finished his secondary school at Frederiksborg latin school in 1866.

== Education and professional life ==
William Sørensen passed the medical entry exam at University of Copenhagen in 1868 but then changed to study zoology under Reinhardt and Schiødte. In a 1867 letter to his childhood friend Viggo Krogh he explains his reasoning and expresses his doubt as to whether he will succeed:

As you know, it was my approximate decision to study medicine, but you may also know that I really all the time have been more inclined to study zoology: in any case, I do recall that I dropped a remark that I maybe wasn't studying medicine. Zoology (perhaps better known to you as the natural history of the animal kingdom) is a very specialized field and thus has very few material interests [should be understood as 'income'] to offer its participants; there may be about 10 positions available to a zoologist [in Denmark] and most of these are very modest, while the rest only under lucky circumstances will be open to me, when I become a skilled scientist in my field, something I surely cannot count on, as it must require a not small degree of geniality. Personal savings, as you know, I have but none. Despite the prospects therefore hardly could be called promising, I have, after mature consideration and solicitation of advice from Louis' [his brother], decided to study zoology.

— William Sørensen, Letter to Viggo Krogh (translated from Danish)

He graduated as a zoologist in 1873 (Cand. mag.), and from 1874 he was employed as teacher in natural history, although intermittently with some larger breaks. He travelled to Argentina in 1877-1878 and then returned to Copenhagen, where he was curator at Copenhagen Zoo for a short while. From 1883 and onwards he was on the board responsible for the secondary school final exam (almindelig Forberedelsesexamen), which gave access to the university.

=== Sound production in fishes ===
During his time in South America he noticed and described as the first the anatomical structures involved in sound production in a large number of soniferous fish species he found in the rivers. Based on this work he defended his doctoral thesis on sound production in fishes on 18. December 1884 and was awarded the degree Dr.Phil. on the 30. December 1884. Official opponents were Japetus Steenstrup, professor at the zoological museum and Carl V. Holten, teacher and former director of the Technical University (Polyteknisk Læreanstalt); ex auditorio (from the audience) were physician and malacologist Rudolph Bergh and assistant at the zoological museum J. E. V. Boas.

=== Morphology and systematics of aracnids ===
William Sørensen's most important contributions to zoology was in the morphology and systematics of arachnids, in particular Opiliones (harvestmen). This work was based on the collections at the Zoological Museum in Copenhagen, specimens collect by himself in South America,, and others, most notably by L.C.C. Koch in Australia, and Yngve Sjöstedt in East Africa. Of particular significance are his later works, edited and published by Henriksen after Sørensen's death.

Sørensen described numerous new species and created several higher order groups, including families within Opiliones: Assamiidae, Epedanidae, Samoidae, Stygnopsidae, Stylocellidae, Triaenonychidae, and Zalmoxidae.

The genus Sorensenella was named in honour of W. Sørensen by R.I. Pocock in 1903 when he described two species of harvestmen endemic to New Zealand.

Bust of William Sørensen on his tombstone. Created 1918 by Rikard Magnusson and donated by the Zoological Laboratory, University of Copenhagen.

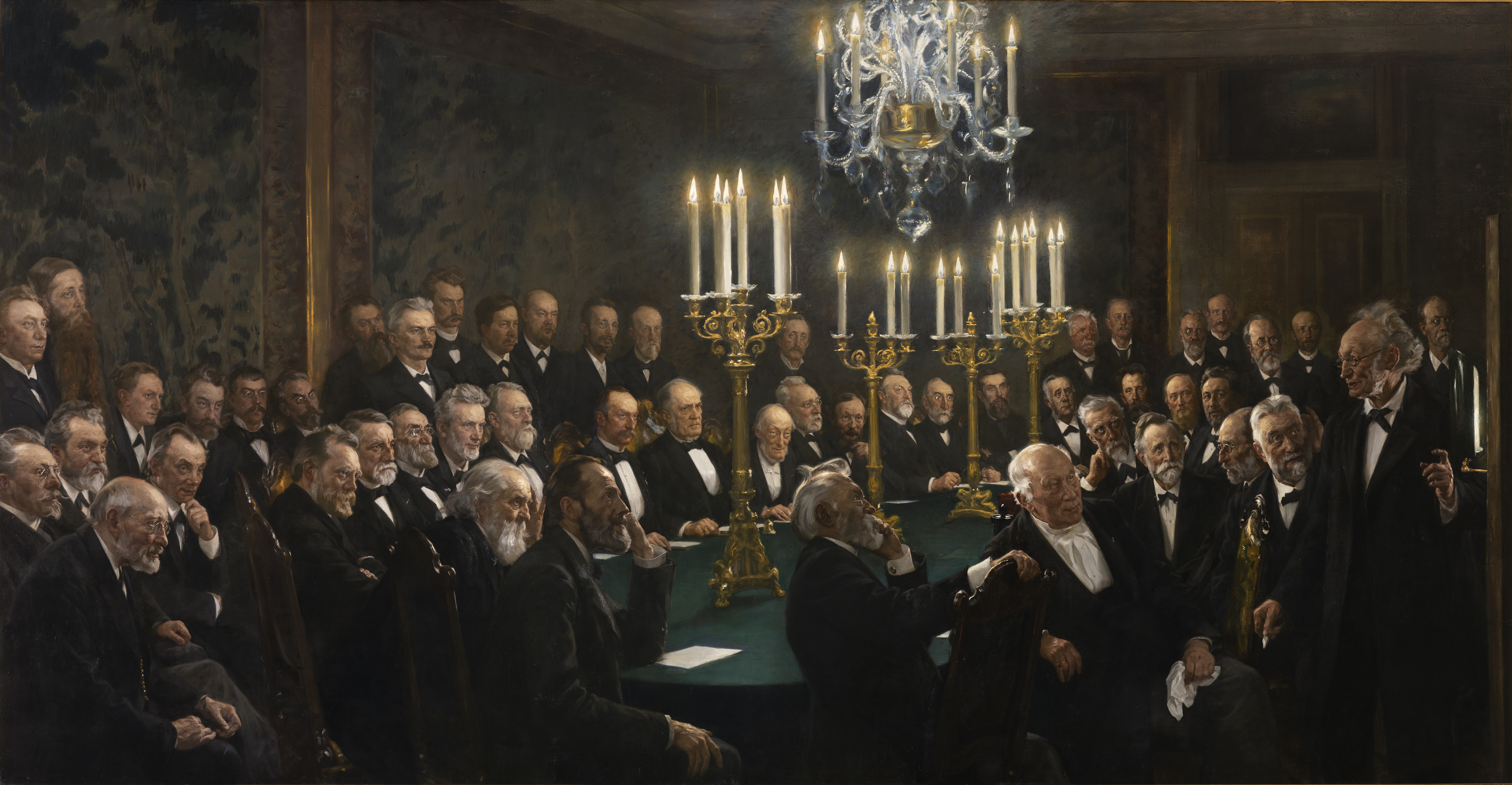
Painting by P.S. Krøyer from 1897: A meeting in the Royal Danish Academy of Sciences and Letters. William Sørensen is standing in the back. Many other of his colleagues are also found, including Boas, Lütken, and Steenstrup.

== Academic disputes ==
William Sørensen had lifelong academic disputes with his contemporaries, well documented from his own writings and responses from peers in scientific literature and newspapers. Most of Sørensen's critique was directed at Japetus Steenstrup (ordinary professor at the University and director of the Zoological Museum) and his students. This conflict can best be understood as an extension of a fundamental conflict between Japetus Steenstrup and his contempary Jørgen M.C. Schiödte (extraordinary professor at the university and Sørensen's doctoral advisor). This conflict, which dominated Danish zoology for more than 50 years, stood between Steenstrup's flamboyant style, quick to draw bold conclusions, against Schiödte's meticulous collection of empirical observations.

Sørensen publishes a book in 1897 , which is an almost 200 pages long argument against his contemporary (and student of Steenstrup) J.E.V. Boas, accusing Boas of plagiarism, and in 1898 (a year after the death of Steenstrup) he published a 50 pages long argument against Christian F. Lütken, (also a student of Steenstrup and his successor as director of the Zoological Museum), on the topic of who discovered the paleolithic kitchen mittens - Steenstrup; or the archaelogist and later director of the Danish National Museum, Jens J.A. Worsaae. Sørensen was (rightly) of the opinion that this honour should fall entirely on Worsaae and not on Steenstrup, as Lütken had claimed in an obiturary of Steenstrup, presented to the Danish Royal Society in 1897.

Sørensen's most extensive critique of not only his peers, but also the governance of the country in general, and the university (of Copenhagen) in particular, came in 1907 with a 500 pages long book entitled "Fromme sjæles gode gjerninger" [Good acts of pious souls].

== Friendship with August Krogh ==
William Sørensen grew up together with Viggo Krogh, the father of August Krogh, and as he was a regular guest at the Krogh family in Grenaa, he also knew August and his siblings from early on. Sørensen was known as "Uncle William" to the childred of Viggo Krogh.

August Krogh and William Sørensen formed a life-long friendship and Krogh refers to Sørensen as "my teacher in scientific method" in the introduction to one of Sørensen's posthumous publications. In the obituary to Sørensen, given by Krogh on the occasion of the revelation of the bust of Sørensen on his grave, he writes:

Many times during vacations as a child have I followed him into the nature, where he showed me how a pider works on its web. How the heart beats in a transparent larvae ... always in such a way that it was a personal experience, something I myself was made to see and understand. William Sørensen had an ability to ask and answer in such a way that his audience realised that in this case was a problem, which required deeper consideration - something one wasn't done with right away.

It is unquestionable that this friendship between Sørensen and Krogh had a formative and lasting influence on Krogh's approach to science. Sørensen's son later wrote about the friendship between Krogh and his father:

The two scientists [were] of the same rigour and driven by the same ideals with respect to fighting for what they considered right and true, and between them grew, despite the large difference in age, a friendship of the most ideal character, of equal personal devotion from both sides.

— Viggo Sørensen

== Personal life ==
Sørensen had received a classical education at the latin school and could read Hebrew (with difficulty), Biblical Greek, and wrote fluently in Latin and English. He also wrote in French, with assistance from his sister. According to his son, William Sørensen was agnostic and his political views formed by his upbringing in the national liberal bourgeoisie. He was a fierce nationalist. Yet, he lacked any sense of greed for material value. To him, truth and justice came before everything else.

Throughout a longer period after his graduation, Sørensen lived with his two sisters and their families on at least two different addresses on Frederiksberg, Copenhagen. This lasted until he married Kirsten Andersson on 29. March 1890 in Grenå. She was born 29 April 1861 in Virring, south of Aarhus, daughter of farmer Åke Andersson (1834–1906) and Gundine Jørgensen (1836–82). Together they had seven children: Viggo (15. Jan 1890), Louis (9 Apr 1891), Ingerid (8 Apr 1893), Aage Peter Strunck (25 Oct 1897), Ejgil (24 Jan 1899), Vagn (15 Jun 1902) and Tyge (25 May 1905). His wife outlived him and died 2. July 1932 in Copenhagen.

== See also ==
- Taxa named by William Sørensen
