= Arhesiro sonoma =

Scientific classification
- Kingdom: Animalia
- Phylum: Arthropoda
- Subphylum: Chelicerata
- Class: Arachnida
- Order: Opiliones
- Family: Sironidae
- Genus: Arhesiro
- Species: A. sonoma

Binomial name
- Arhesiro sonoma (Shear, 1980)

Synonyms
- Including: Siro sonoma Shear, 1980

Species of arachnid

Arhesiro sonoma is a species of mite harvestman in the family Sironidae (as of 2023). It is found in North America, specifically US, California, Sonoma County.

== Description ==
The genus Arhesiro was described by Karaman, 2022, with the type species Siro clousi Giribet & Shear, 2010. Before then, both this species and that other were previously placed in Siro.
