= Holosiro calaveras =

Scientific classification
- Domain: Eukaryota
- Kingdom: Animalia
- Phylum: Arthropoda
- Subphylum: Chelicerata
- Class: Arachnida
- Order: Opiliones
- Family: Sironidae
- Genus: Holosiro
- Species: H. calaveras

Binomial name
- Holosiro calaveras (Giribet & Shear, 2010)

Synonyms
- Including: Siro calaveras Giribet & Shear, 2010

Species of harvestman/daddy longlegs

Holosiro calaveras is a species of mite harvestman in the family Sironidae. It is found in North America, specifically California in Calaveras county.

== Description ==
The species Holosiro calaveras was described by Giribet & Shear, 2010.
