= Holosiro acaroides =

Scientific classification
- Domain: Eukaryota
- Kingdom: Animalia
- Phylum: Arthropoda
- Subphylum: Chelicerata
- Class: Arachnida
- Order: Opiliones
- Family: Sironidae
- Genus: Holosiro
- Species: H. acaroides

Binomial name
- Holosiro acaroides Ewing, 1923

Synonyms
- Including: Siro acaroides (Ewing, 1923) per Newell 1947

Species of harvestman/daddy longlegs

Holosiro acaroides is a species of mite harvestman in the family Sironidae. It is found in North America, specifically USA in the states of Washington, Oregon, & California.

== Description ==
The species Holosiro acaroides was described by Ewing, 1923. The species was revised as Siro acaroides (Ewing, 1923) in Newell 1947 and followed by many authors; but was later restored to its original name combination by Karaman 2022.
