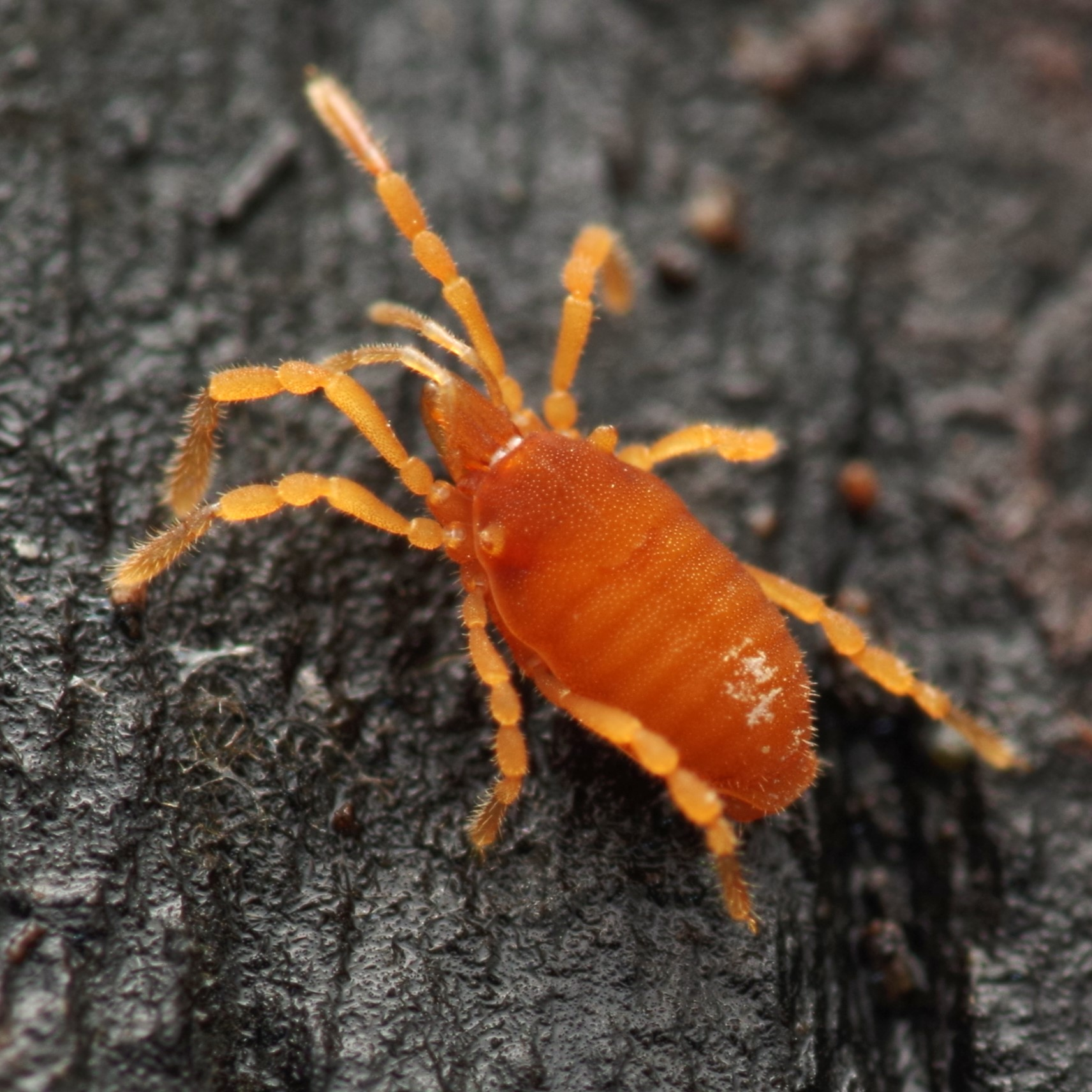
- Siro rubens

Scientific classification
- Kingdom: Animalia
- Phylum: Arthropoda
- Subphylum: Chelicerata
- Class: Arachnida
- Order: Opiliones
- Family: Sironidae
- Genus: Siro; Latreille, 1795

Type species
- Siro rubens Latreille, 1802

Species
- See text

Diversity
- 7 species (inc. 1 extinct)

= Siro (harvestman) =

Genus of harvestmen/daddy longlegs

Siro is a genus of mite harvestmen in the family Sironidae with 7 described species (6 extant, 1 extinct). All are found in Europe.

== Description ==
The genus Siro was described by Latreille, 1795 with the type species Siro rubens Latreille, 1802 only later designated (by subsequent monotypy).

== Species ==
These 7 species (including one extinct species) belong to the genus Siro: (after Giribet & Shear, 2010)

- Siro carpaticus Rafalski, 1956 – Poland, Slovakia
- Siro crassus Novak & Giribet, 2006 – Slovenia
- Siro franzi Karaman & Raspotnig, 2022 – Austria
- Siro ozimeci Karaman, 2022 – Croatia
- Siro rubens Latreille, 1804 – France
- Siro valleorum Chemini, 1990 – Italy
- [Also see † Siro platypedibus Dunlop & Giribet, 2003 (fossil, Bitterfield amber from Bitterfeld, Germany)]

Many species once placed in Siro have since transferred to other genera, including:
To Arhesiro:

- Siro clousi Giribet & Shear, 2010
- Siro sonoma Shear, 1980

To Holosiro:

- Siro acaroides (Ewing, 1923)
- Siro calaveras Giribet & Shear, 2010
- Siro shasta Giribet & Shear, 2010

To Neosiro:

- Siro boyerae Giribet & Shear, 2010
- Siro exilis Hoffman, 1963
- Siro kamiakensis (Newell, 1943)
