= Harvestman phylogeny =

Order of arachnids

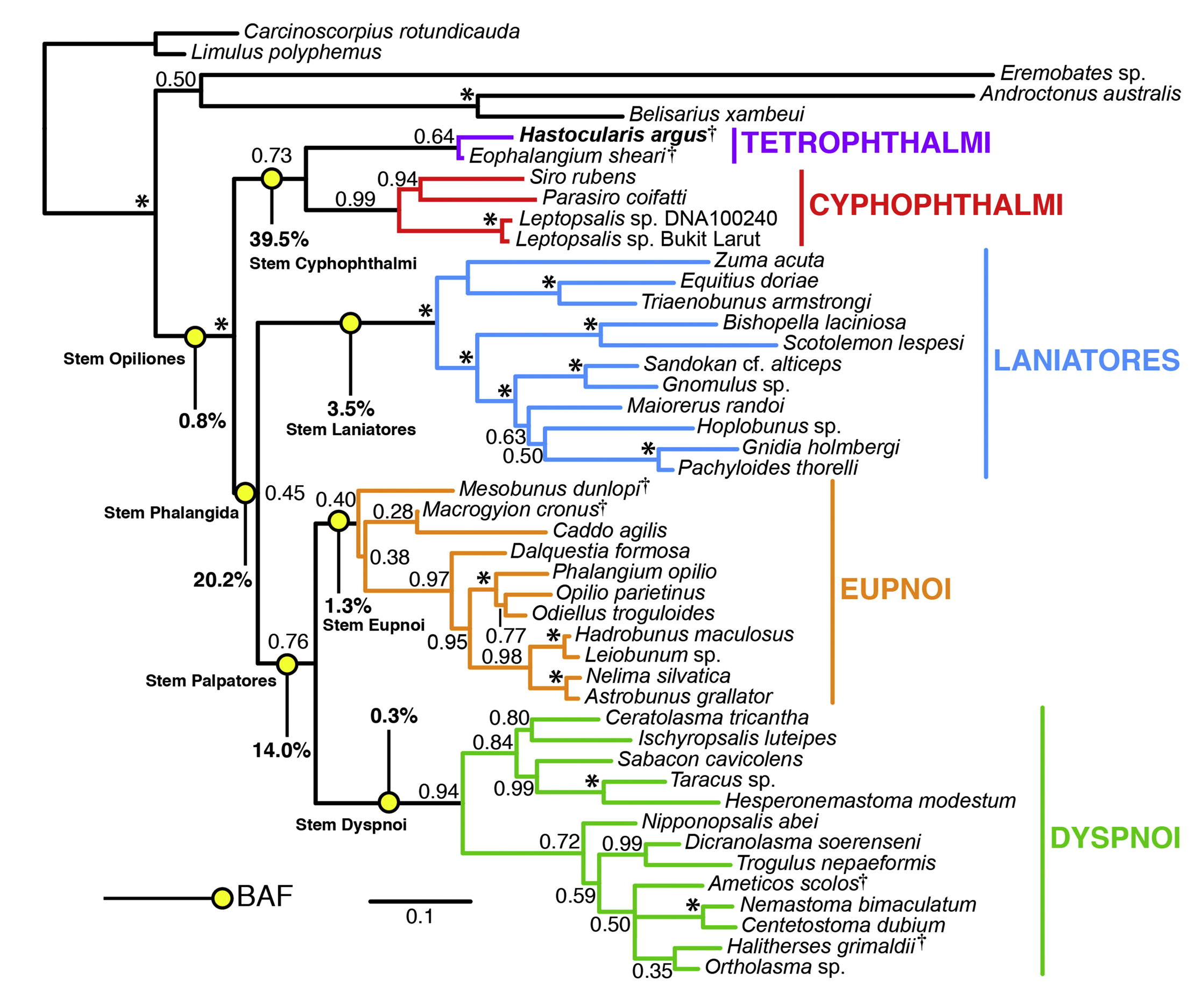
Phylogenetic analysis by Garwood et al. (2014) showing the diversification of Opiliones

Harvestmen (Opiliones) are an order of arachnids often confused with spiders, though the two orders are not closely related. Research on harvestman phylogeny (that is, the phylogenetic tree) is in a state of flux. While some families are clearly monophyletic, that is share a common ancestor, others are not, and the relationships between families are often not well understood.

== Position in Arachnida ==
The relationship of harvestmen with other arachnid orders is still not sufficiently resolved.

- Scorpiones
- - Opiliones
  - - Pseudoscorpiones
    - Solifugae

Dromopoda
(after Giribet et al. 2002)

- Opiliones
- - Scorpiones
  - - Pseudoscorpiones
    - Solifugae

Dromopoda
(after Shultz 1990)

Up until the 1980s they were thought to be closely related to mites (Acari). In 1990, Shultz proposed grouping them with scorpions, pseudoscorpions and Solifugae ("camel spiders"); he named this clade Dromopoda. This view is currently widely accepted. However, the relationships of the orders within Dromopoda are not yet sufficiently resolved. Analyses of recent taxa suggested the harvestmen to be the sister group of the three others, collectively called Novogenuata. An analysis also considering fossil taxa concluded that the harvestmen are sister to Haplocnemata (Pseudoscorpions and Solifugae), with Scorpions being the sister group of those three combined. Recent analyses have also recovered the Opiliones as sister-group to the extinct Phalangiotarbids, although this has low support, or as sister group to a pseudoscorpion and scorpion clade.

== Relationship of suborders ==
In 1796, Pierre André Latreille erected the family "Phalangida" [sic] for the then known harvestmen, but included the genus Galeodes (Solifugae). Tord Tamerlan Teodor Thorell (1892) recognized the suborders Palpatores, Laniatores, Cyphophthalmi (called Anepignathi), but also included the Ricinulei as a harvestman suborder. The latter were removed from the Opiliones by Hansen and William Sørensen (1904), rendering the harvestmen monophyletic.

- Cyphophthalmi
- - Eupnoi
  - - Dyspnoi
    - Laniatores

(after Giribet et al. 2002)

- Cyphophthalmi
- - - Eupnoi
    - Dyspnoi
  - Laniatores

(after Shultz 1998)

According to more recent theories, Cyphophthalmi, the most basal suborder, are a sister group to all other harvestmen, which are according to this system called Phalangida. The Phalangida consist of three suborders, the Eupnoi, Dyspnoi and Laniatores. While these three are each monophyletic, it is not clear how exactly they are related. In 2002, Giribet et al. came to the conclusion that Dyspnoi and Laniatores are sister groups, and called them Dyspnolaniatores, which are sister to Eupnoi. This is in contrast to the classical hypothesis that Dyspnoi and Eupnoi form a clade called Palpatores. Dyspnolaniatores was also recovered in a 2011 study.

In 2014, new analysis by Garwood et al. examined 158 morphological traits across 272 species. In Garwood's phylogenetic tree, the basal Opiliones split into the Phalangida and stem Cyphophthalmi. The Cyphophthalmi stem then diversified into Cyphophthalmi proper and the newly identified Tetrophthalmi, while the Phalangida split into Laniatores and the "Palpatores". Finally, the Palpatores diversified into Eupnoi and Dyspnoi. The analysis moves divergence of the extant suborders from the Devonian Period to the Carboniferous. Opiliones' own divergence is dated to 414 million years ago, which arachnid are estimated to have originated during the late Cambrian to early Ordivician.

Genetic analysis performed on a modern Phalangium opilio specimen found that a suppressed gene that, if active, would generate a second pair of eyes at the lateral location, providing independent evidence of four eyes being the ancestral condition. Garwood et al. also argue that Carboniferous harvestmen diversification is more consistent with changes observed in other terrestrial arthropods, which have been linked to high oxygen levels during that period.

== Relationship within suborders ==
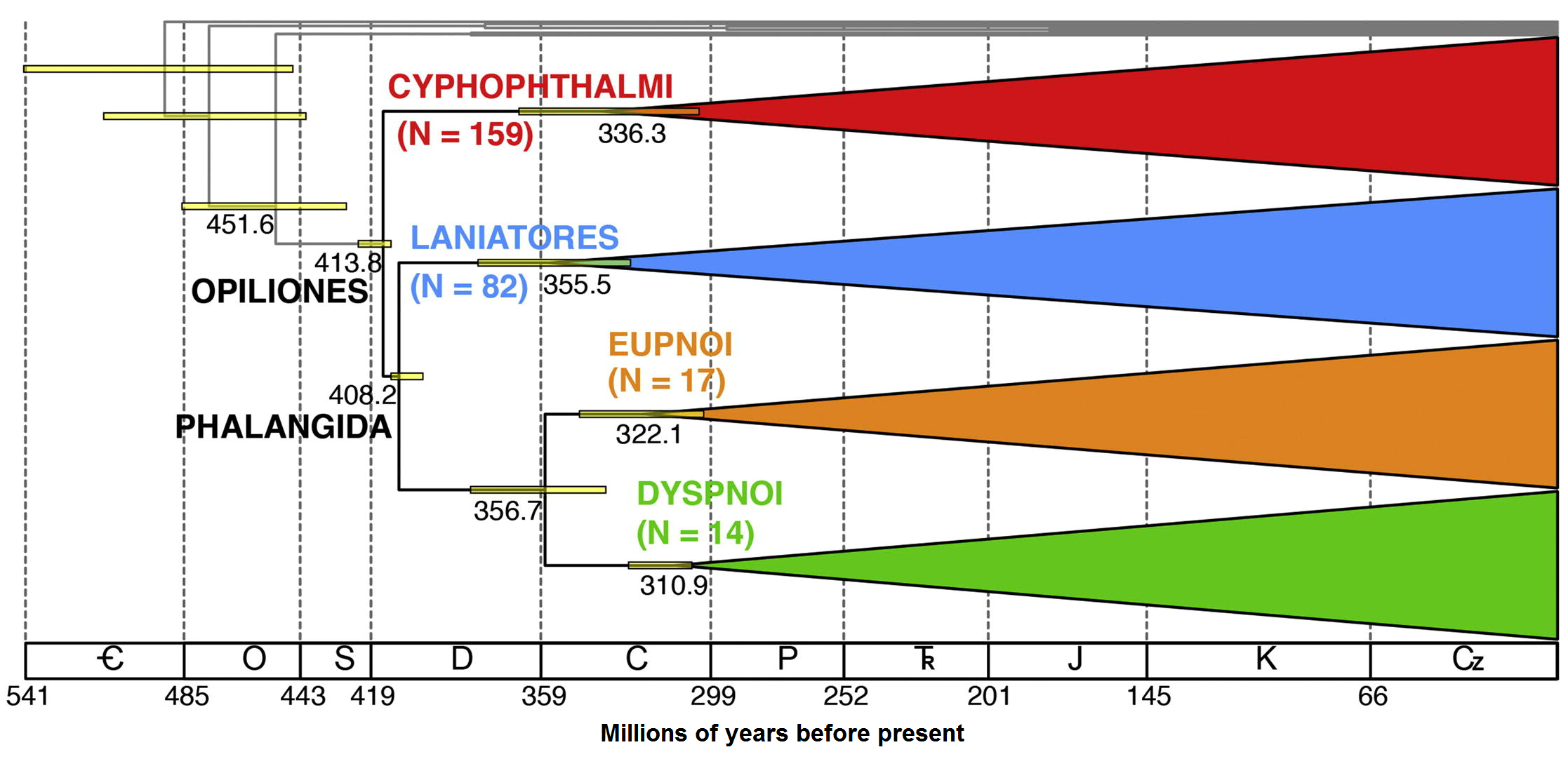
Phylogenetic analyses of Opiliones

=== Cyphophthalmi ===
The Cyphophthalmi have been divided into two infraorders, Temperophthalmi (including the superfamily Sironoidea, with the families Sironidae, Troglosironidae and Pettalidae) and Tropicophthalmi (with the superfamilies Stylocelloidea and its single family Stylocellidae, and Ogoveoidea, including Ogoveidae and Neogoveidae); however, recent studies suggest that the Sironidae, Neogoveidae and Ogoveidae are not monophyletic, while the Pettalidae and Stylocellidae are. The division into Temperophthalmi and Tropicophthalmi is not supported, with Troglosironidae and Neogoveidae probably forming a monophyletic group. The Pettalidae are possibly the sister group to all other Cyphophthalmi.

While most Cyphophthalmi are blind, eyes do occur in several groups. Many Stylocellidae, and some Pettalidae bear eyes near or at the base of the ozophores, as opposed to most harvestmen, which have eyes located on top. The eyes of Stylocellidae could have evolved from the lateral eyes of other arachnids, which have been lost in all other harvestmen. Regardless of their origin, it is thought that eyes were lost several times in Cyphophthalmi.

Spermatophores, which normally do not occur in harvestmen, but in several other arachnids, are present in some Sironidae and Stylocellidae.

=== Eupnoi ===
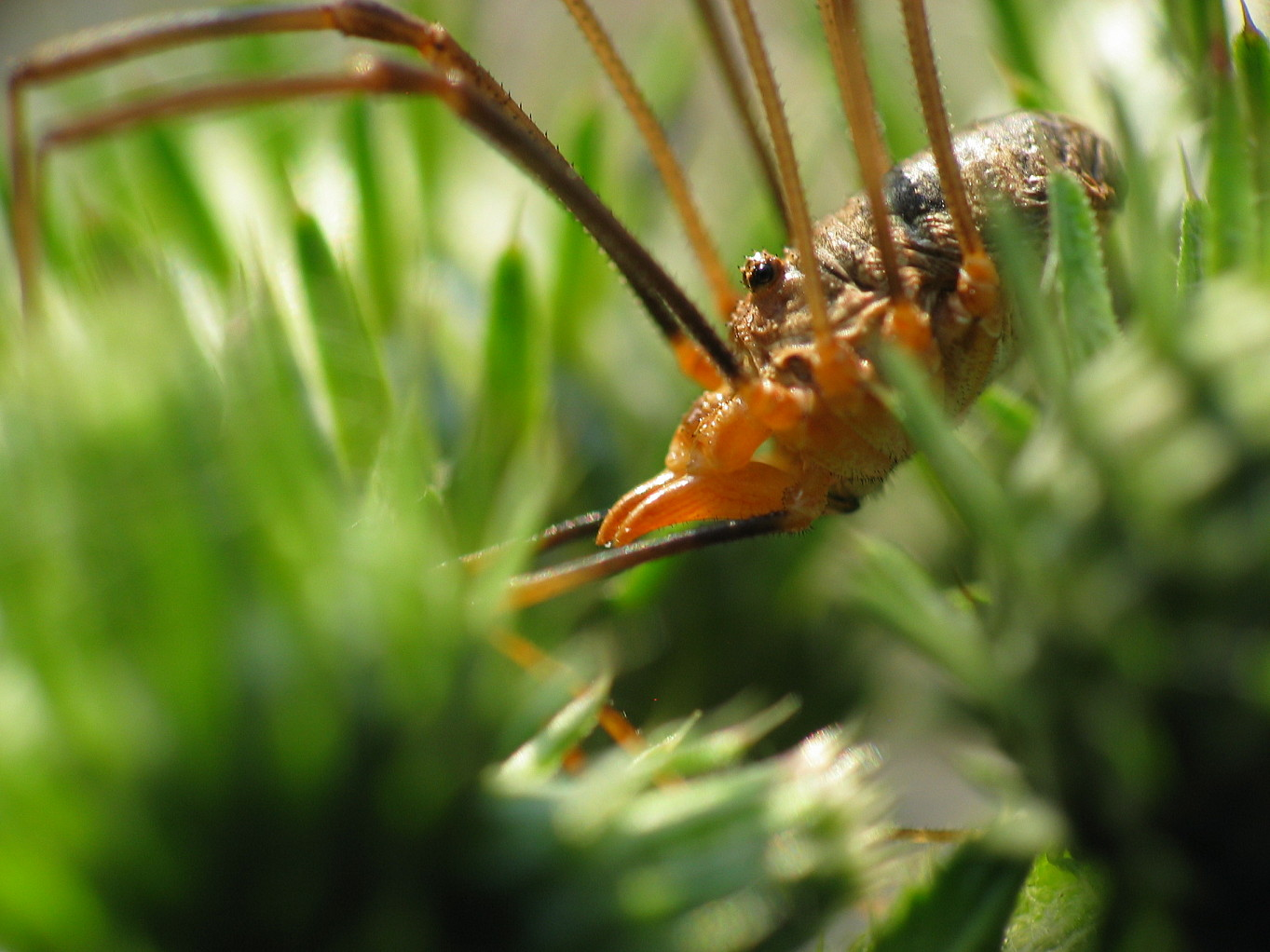
male Phalangium opilio

The Eupnoi are divided into two superfamilies, the Caddoidea and Phalangioidea. The Phalangioidea are assumed to be monophyletic, although only the families Phalangiidae and Sclerosomatidae have been studied; the Caddoidea have not been studied at all in this regard. The limits of families and subfamilies in Eupnoi are uncertain in many cases, and are in urgent need of further study.

=== Dyspnoi ===
Troguloidea

- Nipponopsalididae
- - Nemastomatidae
  - - Dicranolasmatidae
    - Trogulidae

(after Giribet & Kury 2007)

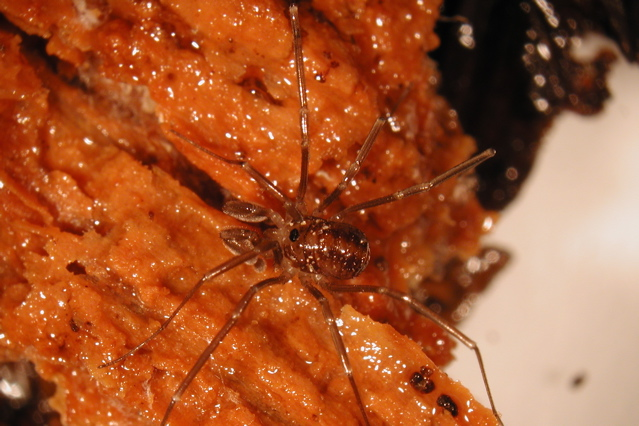
Sabacon cavicolens (Sabaconidae)

The Dyspnoi are probably the best studied harvestman group regarding phylogeny. They are clearly monophyletic, and divided into two superfamilies. The relationship of the superfamily Ischyropsalidoidea, comprising the families Ceratolasmatidae, Ischyropsalididae and Sabaconidae, has been investigated in detail. It is not clear whether Ceratolasmatidae and Sabaconidae are each monophyletic, as the ceratolasmatid Hesperonemastoma groups with the sabaconid Taracus in molecular analyses. All other families are grouped under Troguloidea.

=== Laniatores ===
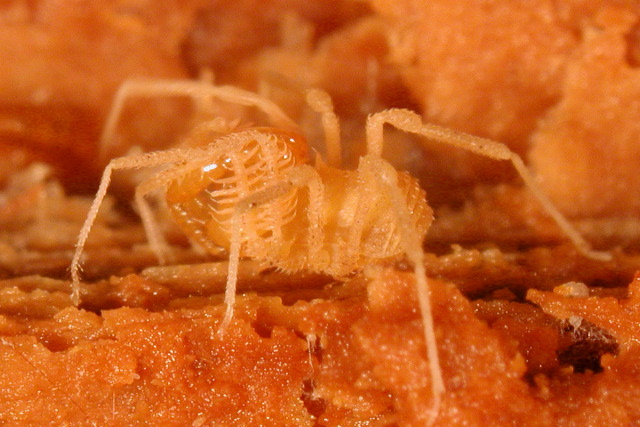
Fumontana deprehendor (Triaenonychidae)

There is not yet a proposed phylogeny for the whole group of Laniatores, although some families have been researched in this regard. The Laniatores are divided into two infraorders, the "Insidiatores" Loman, 1900 and the Grassatores Kury, 2002. However, Insidiatores is probably paraphyletic. It consists of the two superfamilies Travunioidea and Triaenonychoidea, with the latter closer to the Grassatores. Alternatively, the Pentanychidae, which reside in Travunioidea, could be the sister group to all other Laniatores.

The Grassatores are traditionally divided into the Samooidea, Assamioidea, Gonyleptoidea, Phalangodoidea and Zalmoxoidea. Several of these groups are not monophyletic. Molecular analyses relying on nuclear ribosomal genes support monophyly of Gonyleptidae, Cosmetidae (both Gonyleptoidea), Stygnopsidae (currently Assamioidea) and Phalangodidae. The Phalangodidae and Oncopodidae may not form a monophyletic group, thus rendering the Phalangodoidea obsolete. The families of the obsolete Assamioidea have been moved to other groups: Assamiidae and Stygnopsidae are now Gonyleptoidea, Epedanidae reside within their own superfamily Epedanoidea, and the "Pyramidopidae" are possibly related to Phalangodidae.
