= Huitaca =

Huitaca may refer to:

- Huitaca (goddess), Muisca goddess of arts, dance, music, sexual liberation and the Moon
- Huitaca (harvestman), a genus of harvestmen in the family Ogoveidae
