= Aoraki (disambiguation) =

Aoraki is a Māori word for Mount Cook, the highest mountain in New Zealand. The name may also refer to:

- 3810 Aoraki, a main-belt asteroid discovered in 1985
- Aoraki / Mount Cook National Park, a National Park centred on Aoraki / Mount Cook
- Aoraki Mackenzie International Dark Sky Reserve, a dark sky reserve in New Zealand
- Aoraki (New Zealand electorate), a former parliamentary electorate covering South Canterbury and northern Otago
- Aoraki (harvestman), a genus of Pettalidae (spiders)
- Aoraki Polytechnic, a tertiary institution in Timaru
