= Rakaia (disambiguation) =

Rakaia is a town in Canterbury, New Zealand. It may also refer to:

- MV Rakaia, a British cargo liner in service 1946-71
- Rakaia River, one of the largest braided rivers in New Zealand

- Rakaia Gorge, located on the Rakaia River in inland Canterbury

- Rakaia (New Zealand electorate), a former New Zealand electorate
- Rakaia railway accident, an accident on 11 March 1899 at the Rakaia Railway Station
- Rakaia (harvestman), a genus of arachnids, in the order Opiliones
