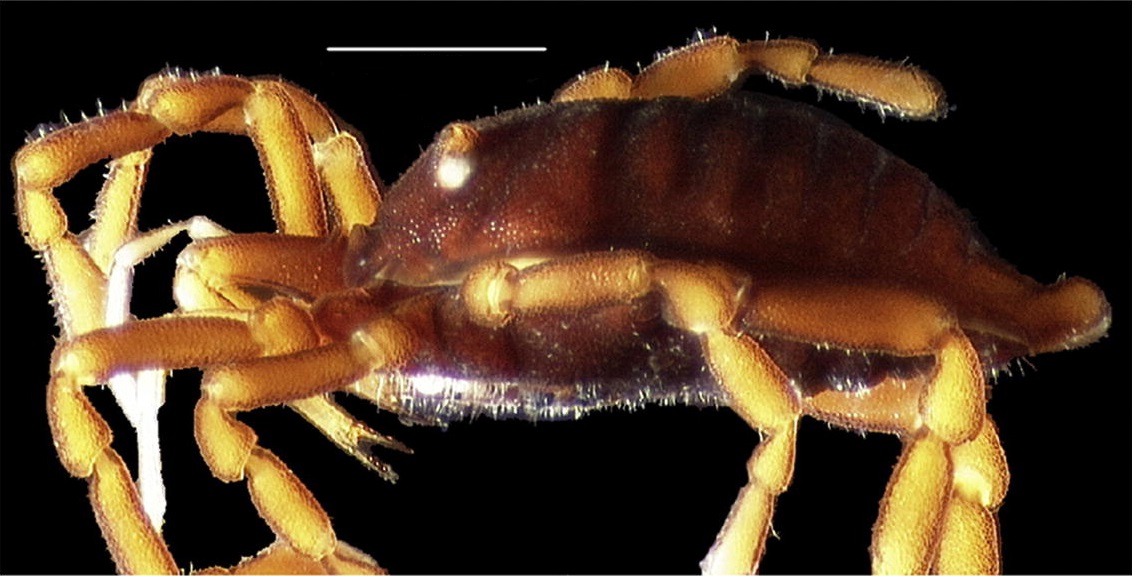
- Adult Pettalus. Scale bar: 1 mm

Scientific classification
- Kingdom: Animalia
- Phylum: Arthropoda
- Subphylum: Chelicerata
- Class: Arachnida
- Order: Opiliones
- Suborder: Cyphophthalmi
- Infraorder: Scopulophthalmi; Giribet, Sharma, Boyer, Clouse, de Bivort, Dimitrov, Kawauchi, Murienne & Schwendinger, 2012
- Family: Pettalidae; Simon, 1879

Diversity
- 10 genera, 75 species
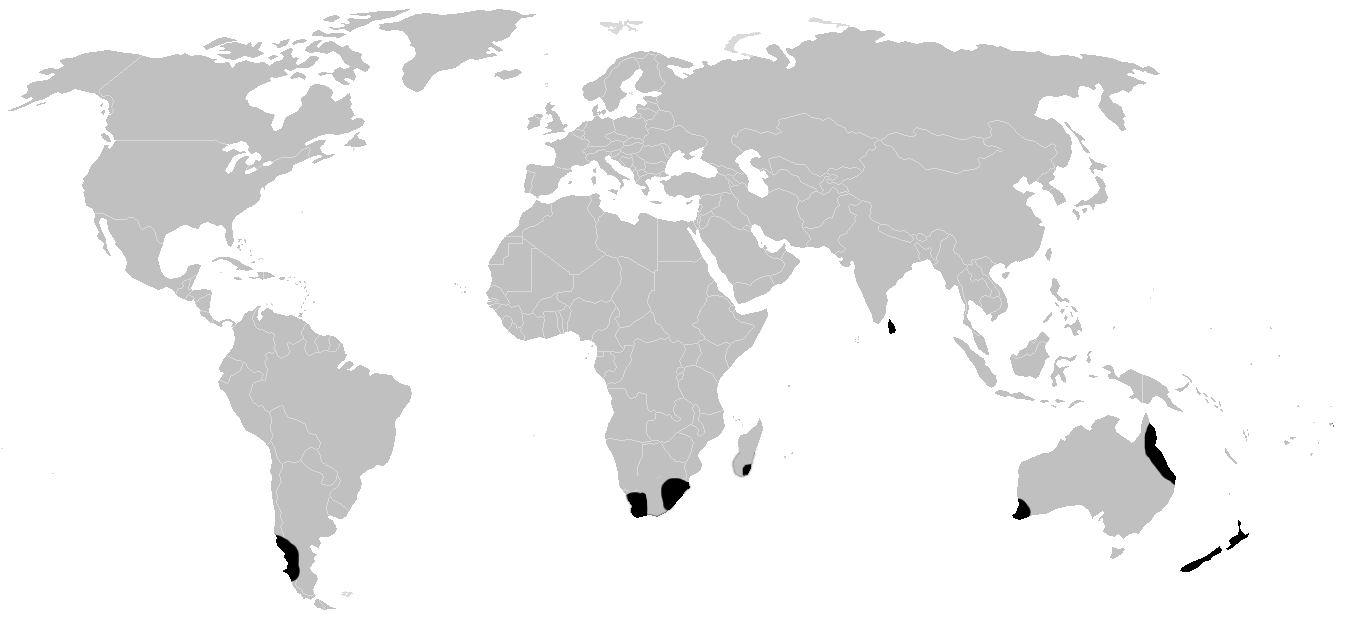

= Pettalidae =

Family of arachnids

The Pettalidae are a family of harvestmen with 75 described species in 10 genera. Several undescribed species are known or assumed in some genera.

== Name ==
Pettalus is a name from Greek mythology that appears in Ovid's Metamorphoses.

== Description ==
All species except the cave-dwelling South African Speleosiro argasiformis spend their entire life cycle in leaf litter.

They are two to five millimeters long, usually with an oval shaped body.

Although all Pettalidae except Parapurcellia have eyes, these were long thought to be absent in the family, mainly because they cannot be seen by scanning electron microscopy. They are often incorporated at the base of the ozophores and typically lack lenses.

== Distribution ==
The members of this family are distributed throughout former temperate Gondwana, with genera in Chile, South Africa, Madagascar, Sri Lanka, eastern and western Australia, and New Zealand, where they are most diverse by far, with 29 species and subspecies found in three genera.

== Relationships ==
- - Parapurcellia (eastern South Africa)
  - - Neopurcellia (New Zealand)
    - - Rakaia (New Zealand)
      - Aoraki (New Zealand)
      - Purcellia (western South Africa)
      - Chileogovea (Chile)
      - - Karripurcellia (Western Australia)
        - Pettalus (Sri Lanka)
      - Austropurcellia (Queensland)

Phylogeny of most Pettalidae(after Boyer & Giribet 2007)

The family Pettalidae is monophyletic, although it is at the moment (2007) unclear what the nearest relatives are. It probably originated in the southern part of Gondwana. Parsimony analysis suggests it could be a sister group to the remaining Cyphophthalmi, though this could also be the case for the Stylocellidae, or it could be related to the Sironidae, or specifically to the sironid genus Suzukielus. It is unrelated to the Troglosironidae that are endemic to New Caledonia.

The main lineages of the family may have arisen rapidly, possibly during the rapid expansion of Glossopteris forests that were predominant in temperate Gondwana. Pettalidae were likely present throughout the forests of Antarctica, which formed a land bridge between Australia and South America up until circa 50 million years ago (mya).

The Australian genera Austropurcellia (Eastern Australia: Queensland) and Karripurcellia (Western Australia) are not sister groups. It is possible that the Cyphophthalmi dispersed across Australia while the central region was covered with Nothofagus rainforest (until 37 mya), or that the ancestors of the two genera independently dispersed from adjacent landmasses now separate from Australia.

Parapurcellia from eastern South Africa is sister to all other Pettalidae, while Purcellia from western South Africa is sister to the Chilean Chileogovea. Western South Africa and southern South America were last connected during the Late Jurassic, about 150 mya. Likewise, the monotypic Neopurcellia from New Zealand appears as the sister group to all Pettalidae except for Parapurcellia, instead of being monophyletic with the other two New Zealand genera, which themselves appear as sister groups in Bayesian analysis, but not in direct optimization parsimony analyses.

== Species ==
The family Pettalidae contains the following genera and species:

- Aoraki Boyer & Giribet, 2007 (New Zealand)

- Aoraki calcarobtusa (Forster, 1952)
- Aoraki crypta (Forster, 1948)
- Aoraki denticulata (Forster, 1948)

- Aoraki denticulata denticulata (Forster, 1948)
- Aoraki denticulata major (Forster, 1952)

- Aoraki granulosa (Forster, 1952)
- Aoraki healyi (Forster, 1948)
- Aoraki inerma (Forster, 1948)
- Aoraki longitarsa (Forster, 1952)
- Aoraki stephenesis (Forster, 1952)
- Aoraki tumidata (Forster, 1948)
- Aoraki westlandica (Forster, 1952)

- Archaeopurcellia Giribet, Shaw, Lord & Derkarabetian, 2022

- Archaeopurcellia eureka Giribet, Shaw, Lord & Derkarabetian, 2022

- Austropurcellia Juberthie, 1988

- Austropurcellia absens Boyer & Popkin-Hall, 2015
- Austropurcellia acuta Popkin-Hall & Boyer, 2014
- Austropurcellia alata Boyer & Reuter, 2012
- Austropurcellia arcticosa (Cantrell, 1980)
- Austropurcellia barbata Popkin-Hall & Boyer, 2014
- Austropurcellia cadens Baker & Boyer, 2015
- Austropurcellia capricornia (Davies, 1977)
- Austropurcellia clousi Boyer, Baker & Popkin-Hall, 2015
- Austropurcellia culminis Boyer & Reuter, 2012
- Austropurcellia daviesae (Juberthie, 1989)
- Austropurcellia despectata Boyer & Reuter, 2012
- Austropurcellia finniganensis Popkin-Hall, Jay & Boyer, 2016
- Austropurcellia forsteri (Juberthie, 2000)
- Austropurcellia fragosa Popkin-Hall, Jay & Boyer, 2016
- Austropurcellia giribeti Boyer & Quay, 2015
- Austropurcellia megatanka Jay, Coblens & Boyer, 2016
- Austropurcellia monteithi Jay, Popkin-Hall, Coblens & Boyer, 2016
- Austropurcellia nuda Popkin-Hall, Jay & Boyer, 2016
- Austropurcellia riedeli Jay, Coblens & Boyer, 2016
- Austropurcellia scoparia Juberthie, 1988
- Austropurcellia sharmai Boyer & Quay, 2015
- Austropurcellia superbensis Popkin-Hall & Boyer, 2014
- Austropurcellia tholei Baker & Boyer, 2015
- Austropurcellia vicina Boyer & Reuter, 2012
- Austropurcellia woodwardi (Forster, 1955)

- Chileogovea Roewer, 1961 (Chile)

- Chileogovea jocasta Shear, 1993
- Chileogovea oedipus Roewer, 1961

- Karripurcellia Giribet, 2003 (Australia: Western Australia)

- Karripurcellia peckorum Giribet, 2003
- Karripurcellia sierwaldae Giribet, 2003

- Manangotria Shear & Gruber, 1996 (Madagascar)

- Manangotria taolanaro Shear & Gruber, 1996

- Neopurcellia Forster, 1948 (New Zealand: South Island)

- Neopurcellia salmoni Forster, 1948

- Parapurcellia Rosas Costa, 1950 (eastern South Africa)

- Parapurcellia amatola de Bivort & Giribet, 2010
- Parapurcellia convexa de Bivort & Giribet, 2010
- Parapurcellia fissa Lawrence, 1939
- Parapurcellia minuta de Bivort & Giribet, 2010
- Parapurcellia monticola Lawrence, 1939
- Parapurcellia natalia de Bivort & Giribet, 2010
- Parapurcellia peregrinator Lawrence, 1963
- Parapurcellia rumpiana Lawrence, 1933
- Parapurcellia silvicola Lawrence, 1939
- Parapurcellia staregai de Bivort & Giribet, 2010
- Parapurcellia transvaalica (Lawrence, 1963)

- Pettalus Thorell, 1876 (Sri Lanka)

- Pettalus brevicauda Pocock, 1897
- Pettalus cimiciformis O. P-Cambridge, 1875
- Pettalus lampetides Sharma & Giribet, 2006
- Pettalus thwaitesi Sharma, Karunarathna & Giribet, 2009

- Purcellia Hansen & Sørensen, 1904 (western South Africa)

- Purcellia argasiformis Lawrence, 1931
- Purcellia griswoldi de Bivort & Giribet, 2010
- Purcellia illustrans Hansen & Sørensen, 1904
- Purcellia lawrencei de Bivort & Giribet, 2010
- Purcellia leleupi Starega, 2008

- Rakaia Hirst, 1926 (New Zealand)

- Rakaia antipodiana Hirst, 1926
- Rakaia australis Forster, 1952
- Rakaia collaris Roewer, 1942
- Rakaia digitata Forster, 1952
- Rakaia dorothea Phillipps & Grimmett, 1932
- Rakaia florensis Forster, 1948
- Rakaia insula Forster, 1952
- Rakaia isolata Forster, 1952
- Rakaia lindsayi Forster, 1952
- Rakaia macra Boyer & Giribet, 2003
- Rakaia magna Forster, 1948
- Rakaia media Forster, 1948
- Rakaia minutissima Forster, 1948
- Rakaia pauli Forster, 1952
- Rakaia solitaria Forster, 1948
- Rakaia sorenseni Forster, 1952
- Rakaia stewartiensis Forster, 1948
- Rakaia uniloca Forster, 1952

== See also ==
- Environment of Sri Lanka
