= Huitaca boyacaensis =

Scientific classification
- Kingdom: Animalia
- Phylum: Arthropoda
- Subphylum: Chelicerata
- Class: Arachnida
- Order: Opiliones
- Family: Neogoveidae
- Genus: Huitaca
- Species: H. boyacaensis

Binomial name
- Huitaca boyacaensis Benavides & Giribet, 2013

Species of harvestman/daddy longlegs

Huitaca boyacaensis is a species of neotropical harvestmen in the family Neogoveidae, first described by Ligia Benavides and Gonzalo Giribet in 2013.

== Taxonomy ==
Huitaca boyacaensis used to be placed in the family of Ogoveidae (2003) but is reclassified under Neogoveidae (2007).

== Etymology and habitat ==
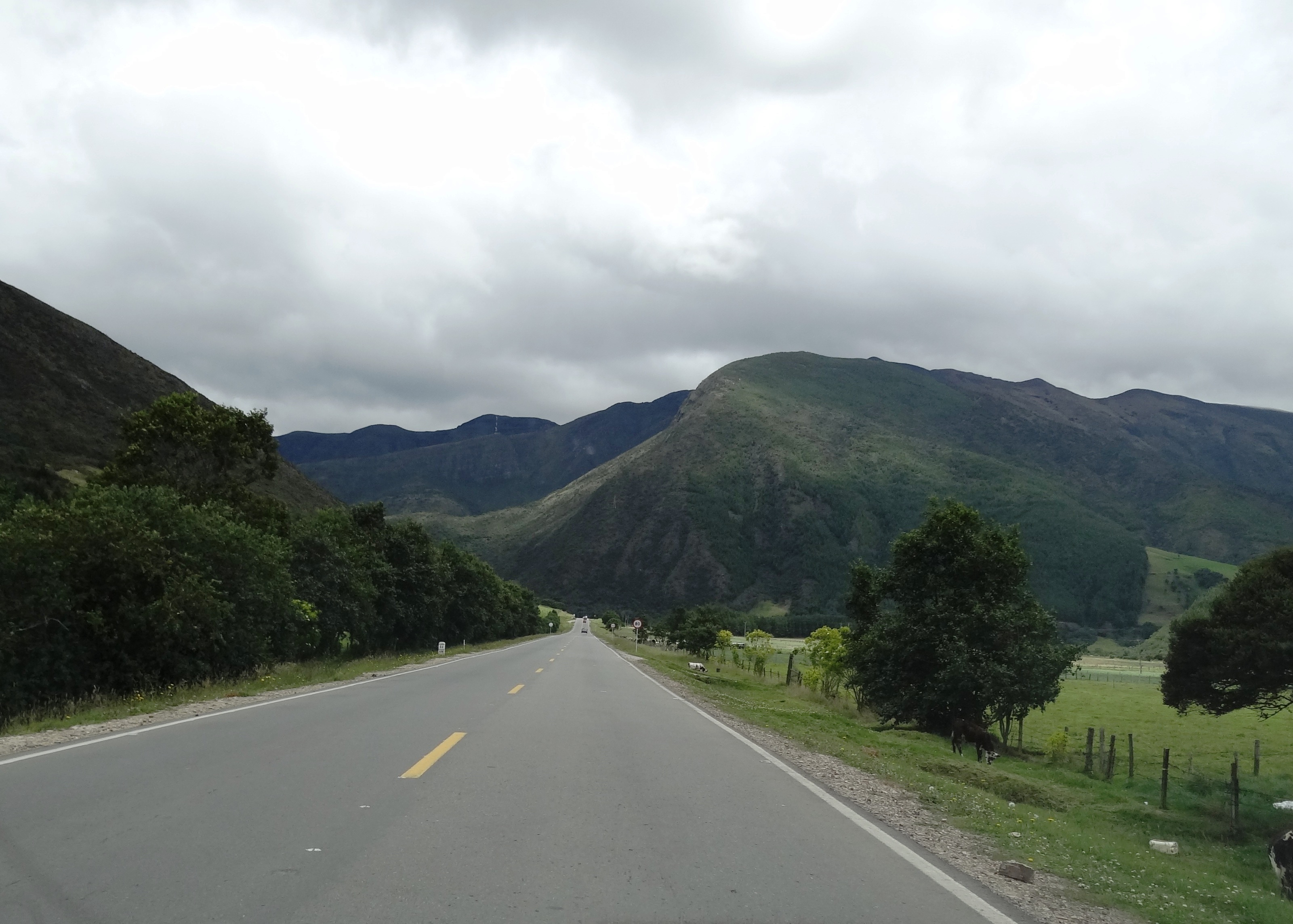
Road near Arcabuco; habitat of Huitaca boyacaensis

Both the genus Huitaca and the species epithet boyacaensis are named after the culture of the Muisca; Huitaca was the rebelling goddess of sexual liberation in the Muisca religion and Boyacá is one of the departments of Colombia where the Muisca lived.

The holotype has been found near the road from Arcabuco to Moniquirá on the Altiplano Cundiboyacense at an altitude of 2,559 metres (8,396 ft). Nineteen paratype specimens have been collected at the same location; eight males, six females and five juveniles.

== Description ==
Large species with an anterior opisthosomal sternal complex of themale consisting of three digit-like apophyses pointing backward, densely ornamented with conspicuous gland openings. The sternal organ seems to be homologous to Huitaca ventralis and Huitaca tama. The male specimen has a dark brown body with lighter legs. Total length of the male holotype is 4.86 millimetres (0.191 in) and of the female paratype 4.59 millimetres (0.181 in).

== See also ==
- List of flora and fauna named after the Muisca
- Huitaca

== Bibliography ==
- Benavides, Ligia; Giribet, Gonzalo (2013). "A Revision of Selected Clades of Neotropical Mite Harvestmen (Arachnida, Opiliones, Cyphophthalmi, Neogoveidae) with the Description of Eight New Species" (PDF). Bulletin of the Museum of Comparative Zoology. 161. Museum of Comparative Zoology, Harvard University: 1–44. doi:10.3099/0027-4100-161.1.1. S2CID 55229116.
- Giribet, Gonzalo; et al. (2011). "Evolutionary and biogeographical history of an ancient and global group of arachnids (Arachnida: Opiliones: Cyphophthalmi) with a new taxonomic arrangement" (PDF). Biological Journal of the Linnean Society. 105. The Linnean Society of London: 1–39. doi:10.1111/j.1095-8312.2011.01774.x.
