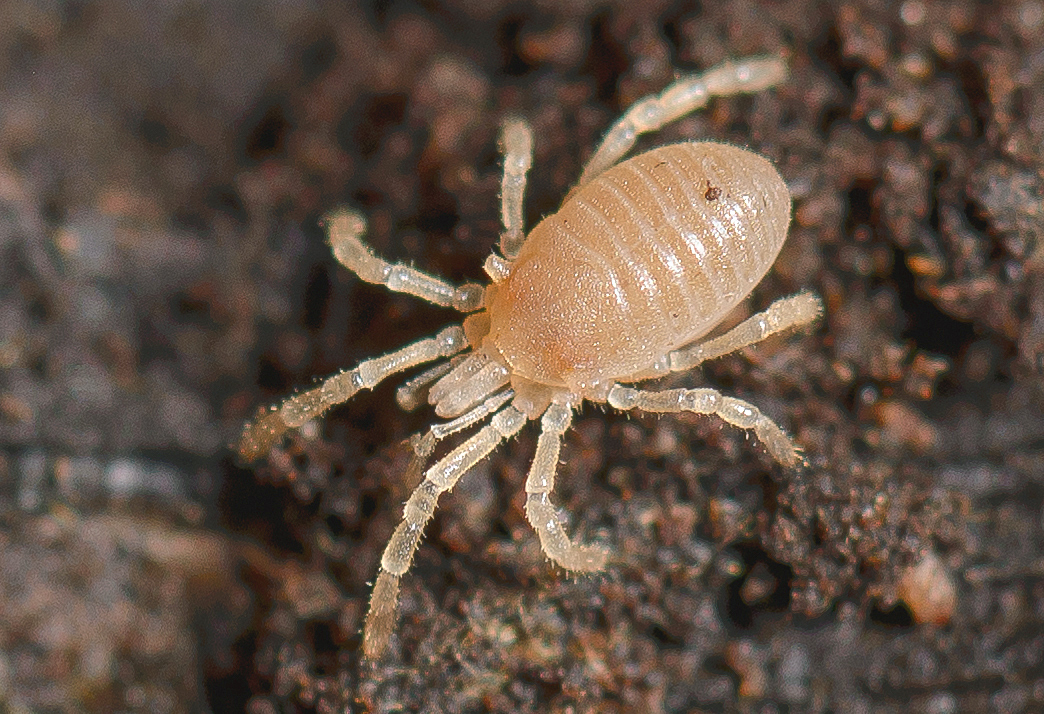
- Immature Metasiro sassafrasensis

Scientific classification
- Kingdom: Animalia
- Phylum: Arthropoda
- Subphylum: Chelicerata
- Class: Arachnida
- Order: Opiliones
- Suborder: Cyphophthalmi
- Infraorder: Sternophthalmi
- Family: Neogoveidae; Shear, 1980

Diversity
- 8 genera, 27 species
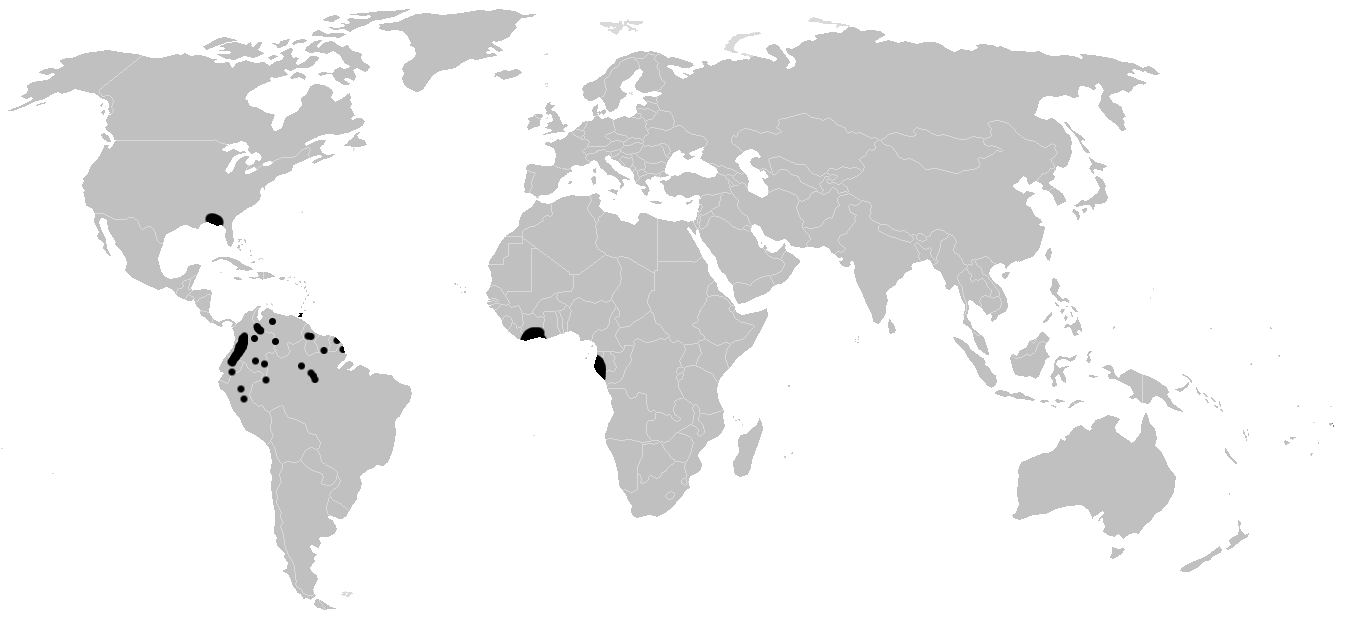

= Neogoveidae =

Family of harvestmen/daddy longlegs

The Neogoveidae are a family of harvestmen with 27 described species in eight genera. However, eight species of Huitaca, 17 species of Metagovea and 12 species of Neogovea are currently awaiting description.

== Name ==
The name is a combination of Ancient Greek neo "new" and Ogoveidae, a previously described family of Cyphophthalmi that is closely related to Neogoveidae.

== Description ==
Neogoveidae are 1 to 4.5 mm long and eyeless. They often exhibit a solea (modified area with a high concentration of sensory setae) on the first pair of tarsi. Their chelicerae are smooth, with a dorsal crest and ventral process, and can be either short and robust or long and antennuate. They possess laterally projecting ozophores, tarsal claws on the second pair of legs with a row of teeth, tarsal claws on the third and fourth pairs of legs often with small pegs, and an inconspicuous or absent opisthosomal median furrow. The adenostyle is variable, and can be lamelliform, fimbriate, or digitiform. They exhibit both the fusion of coxae 2 and 3, and the fusion of sternites 8 and 9 with tergite 9, the latter of which forms a complete corona analis, which is not present in the genus Metasiro. Exocrine gland pores are located on the sternum in most genera, except Canga and Neogovea, in which they are absent, and Metasiro, in which they are located on the anal plate. The dorsal scutum is heavily granulated, the metatarsi of the legs are ornamented, and the structure of the spermatopositor is highly variable across genera.

== Distribution ==
Neogoveidae occur in tropical regions between 10° north and 5° south of the equator in both South America and West Africa, with the exception of Metasiro, which is found in southeastern United States.

Current research suggests that the diversity of neotropical Neogovidae is much higher than currently known, as new species were found at virtually every place where samples were taken. Currently, the greatest amount of known Neogoveid diversity is known from Colombia, although it is unknown if this reflects greater ecosystem diversity or greater sampling efforts in that country. It is thought that Neogoveidae possesses a considerably large amount of undescribed diversity compared to most other Cyphophthalmi families.

A recent phylogeographical study of Metasiro suggests that, as the genus exists at endpoints of large watersheds, mite harvestmen may be able to disperse by utilizing moving bodies of water.

== Relationships ==
Molecular studies suggest that the South American species are paraphyletic, with the North American Metasiro forming a sister group to all other Neogoveids, Canga forming a sister group to the African Parogovia, and the rest of the South American genera forming a clade. The family is believed to form a sister group relationship with the West African family Ogoveidae. Together, these 2 families make up the superfamily Ogoveoidea, which is the sister group to Troglosironidae. Troglosironidae and Ogoveoidea together make up the infraorder Sternophthalmi, which is well supported as monophyletic by recent phylogenetic analyses.

- Neogoveidae
  - Metasiro
  - - - Canga
      - Parogovia
    - - - Brasiliogovea
        - Neogovea
      - - Metagovea
        - - Huitaca
          - Tucanogovea

Recovered by Giribet et al. (2012), with position of Tucanogovea based on original description by Karaman (2013).

The species Shearogovea mexasca was formerly included in the genus Neogovea, but has since been removed from both the genus and the family, and its taxonomic position within Cyphophthalmi is uncertain. It has been proposed, however, that the species be re-included within Neogoveidae, and that Metasiro be excluded from the family.

== Species ==
Species:

- Brasiliogovea Martens, 1969 (Brazil, Colombia)

- Brasiliogovea chiribiqueta Benavides & Giribet, 2013 (Colombia: Caquetá Department)
- Brasiliogovea microphaga Martens, 1969 (Brazil: Amazonas)

- Canga DaSilva, Pinto-da-Rocha, Giribet, 2010 (Brazil)

- Canga renatae DaSilva, Pinto-da-Rocha, Giribet, 2010 (Pará)

- Huitaca Shear, 1979 (Colombia)

- Huitaca bitaco Benavides & Giribet, 2013 (Valle del Cauca Department)
- Huitaca boyacaensis Benavides & Giribet, 2013 (Boyacá Department)
- Huitaca caldas Benavides & Giribet, 2013 (Caldas Department)
- Huitaca depressa Benavides & Giribet, 2013 (Risaralda Department)
- Huitaca sharkeyi Benavides & Giribet, 2013 (Valle del Cauca Department)
- Huitaca tama Benavides & Giribet, 2013 (Norte de Santander Department)
- Huitaca ventralis Shear, 1979 (Norte de Santander Department)

- Metagovea Rosas Costa, 1950 (Brazil, Colombia, Ecuador)

- Metagovea disparunguis Rosas Costa, 1950 (Colombia: Antioquia Department)
- Metagovea ligiae Giupponi & Kury, 2015 (Ecuador: Napo Province)
- Metagovea oviformis Martins, 1969 (Brazil: Amazonas)
- Metagovea philipi Goodnight & Goodnight, 1980 (Ecuador: Morona Santiago Province)

- Metasiro Juberthie, 1960 (USA)

- Metasiro americanus (Davis, 1933) (Florida, Georgia, South Carolina)
- Metasiro sassafrasensis Clouse & Wheeler, 2014 (South Carolina)
- Metasiro savannahensis Clouse & Wheeler, 2014 (South Carolina)

- Neogovea Hinton, 1938 (Brazil, Colombia, France, Guyana, Suriname, Trinidad, Venezuela)

- Neogovea hormigai Benavides & Giribet, 2013 (Guyana: Upper Takutu-Upper Essequibo)
- Neogovea immsi Hinton, 1938 (Brazil: Amapá)
- Neogovea kamakusa Shear, 1977 (Guyana: Essequibo Islands-West Demerara)
- Neogovea kartabo (Davis, 1937) (Guyana: Cuyuni-Mazaruni)
- Neogovea virginie Jocqué & Jocqué, 2011 (France: French Guiana)

- Parogovia Hansen, 1921 (Equatorial Guinea, Gabon, Sierra Leone)

- Parogovia gabonica (Juberthie, 1969) (Gabon: Ogooué-Ivindo Province)
- Parogovia pabsgarnoni Legg, 1990 (Sierra Leone: Western Area)
- Parogovia sironoides Hansen, 1921 (Equatorial Guinea: Bioko)

- Tucanogovea Karaman, 2013 (Brazil)

- Tucanogovea schusteri Karaman, 2013 (Amazonas)

- ?Genus enigmaticus Martens, 1969 (Brazil: Amazonas/Roraima) — not assigned to a genus yet, because no males are known; possibly Neogovea, or Tucanogovea.
