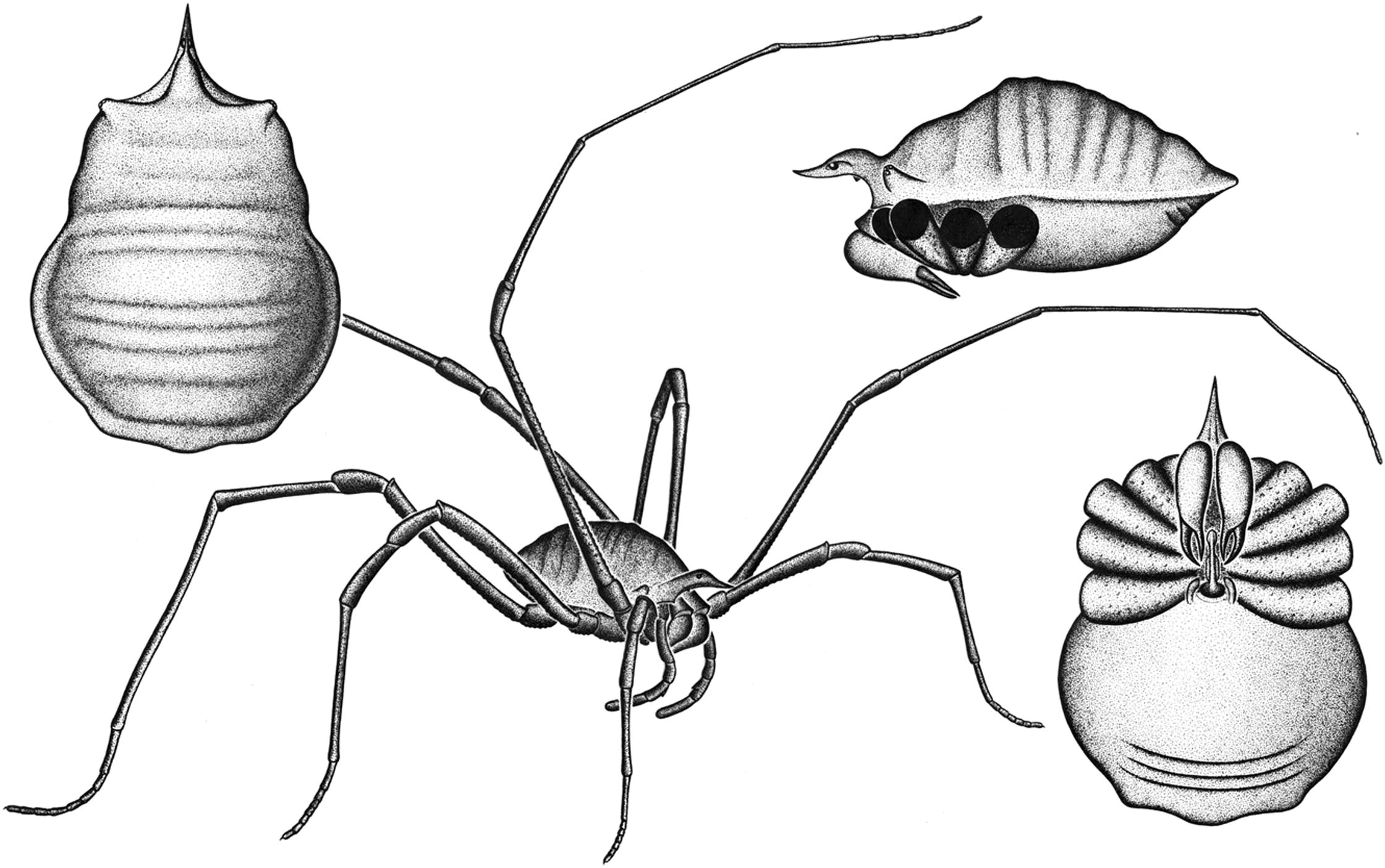
- A reconstruction of Hastocularis argus showing dorsal, lateral, ventral, and anterolateral views
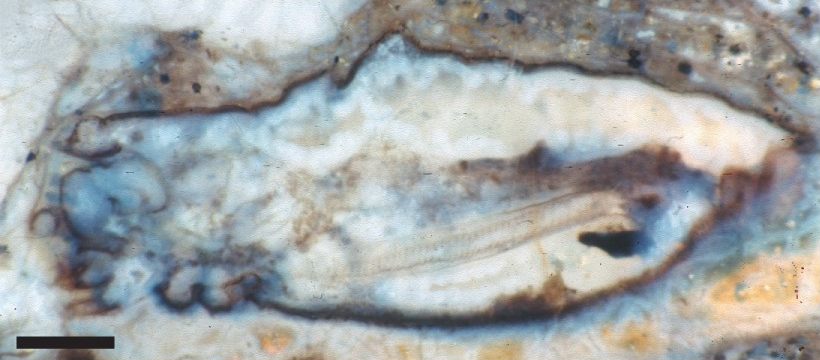
- Fossil of Eophalangium sheari

Scientific classification
- Kingdom: Animalia
- Phylum: Arthropoda
- Subphylum: Chelicerata
- Class: Arachnida
- Order: Opiliones
- Suborder: †Tetrophthalmi; Garwood, Sharma, Dunlop & Giribet, 2014

Genera
- †Eophalangium; †Hastocularis

Diversity
- 2 species

= Tetrophthalmi =

Tetrophthalmi Temporal range: Devonian–Carboniferous

Suborder of harvestmen/daddy longlegs

Tetrophthalmi is an extinct suborder of Opiliones (commonly known as harvestmen or daddy-longlegs) that had both median and lateral eyes. First described in 2014, it is known from two extinct species. Phylogenetic analysis suggests that this eye arrangement is the ancestral condition for harvestmen, placing Tetrophthalmi and Cyphophthalmi in a basal position within Opiliones.

In 2024, a study discovered that living members of Opiliones have retained lateral eyes, as well as a second pair of vestigial median eyes. A reanalysis of harvestman phylogeny based on 78 genes and an updated understanding of morphology revealed that Tetrophthalmi are derived members of the living suborder Eupnoi (true daddy-longlegs).

== Classification history ==
In the early 1980s, a tiny fossil was extracted from the Montceau-les-Mines lagerstätte deposit in Eastern France. The fossil went unstudied for more than 30 years before paleontologist Russell Garwood used X-ray computed tomography (CT scans) to investigate the fossil. In 2014, a team led by Garwood identified the specimen as a novel species, Hastocularis argus, named for the 100-eyed giant Argus Panoptes in Greek mythology. According to their analysis, the specimen died, and was rapidly buried approximately 305 million years ago. Before it decayed, its body was surrounded by the mineral siderite, which formed a protective concretion. The specimen subsequently decayed, leaving a void showing a detailed outline of the creature.

The CT scan revealed that H. argus had two sets of eyes – one set mounted on the ocularium in the middle of head and one set on its side on the stink glands. Performing comparative analysis on 158 morphological features, Garwood's team determined H. argus was closely related to Eophalangium sheari. The two species were not, however, as closely related to the 270 other species of harvestmen studied. The team determined H. argus and E. sheari shared three features – two pairs of eyes, an open gonostome (a part of the reproductive system), and external male genitalia – which distinguish them from all other harvestmen. Thus, the two species were classified into a new suborder, Tetrophthalmi.

Hastocularis argus and the new suborder Tetrophthalmi help explain how arachnid eyes developed. The classification also helps clarify when side-eyed and fore-head eyed harvestmen split into distinct clades.

== Phylogeny ==
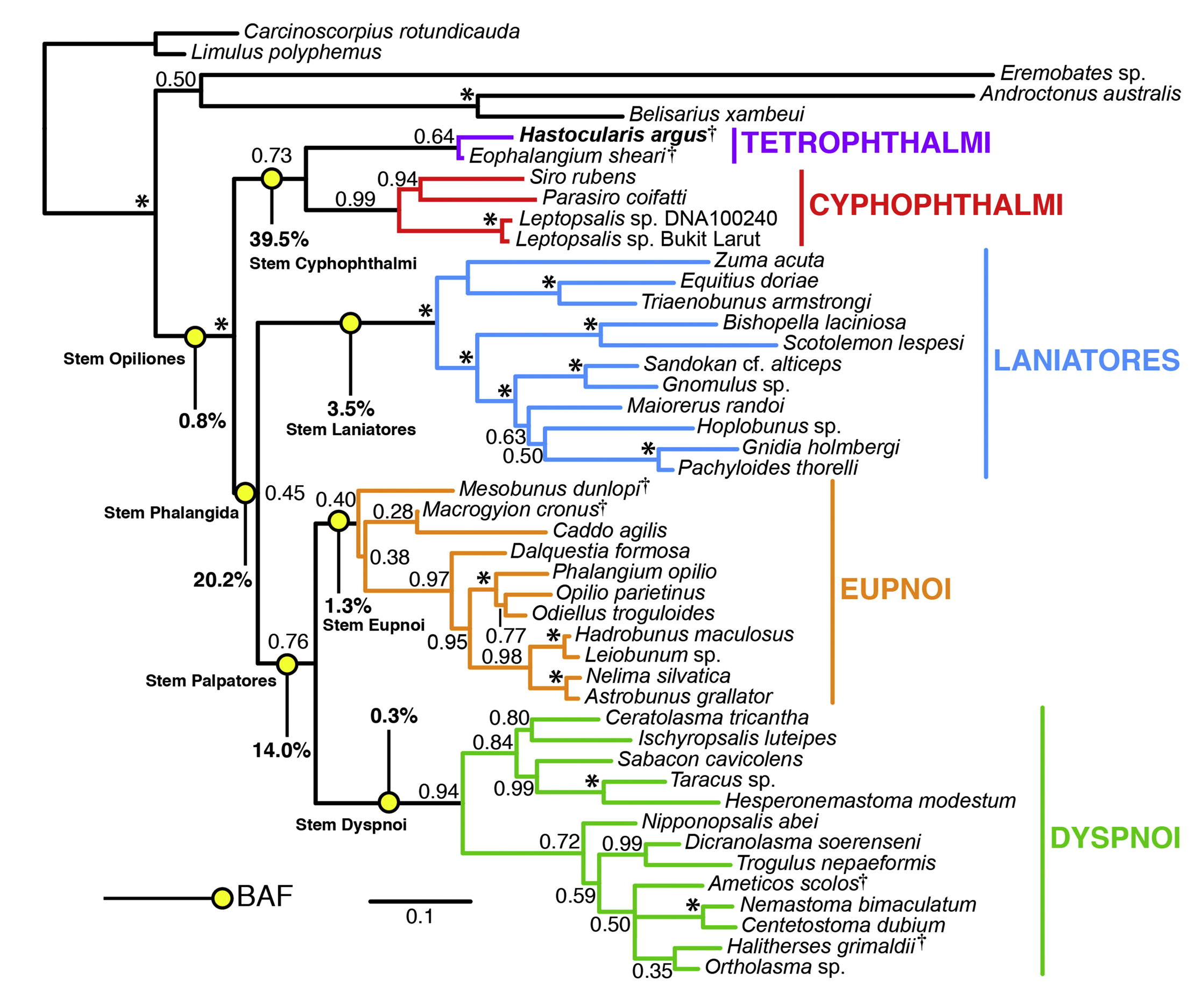
Phylogenetic analysis of Opiliones

In Garwood et al.'s phylogenetic tree, the basal Opiliones split into the "Phalangida" and stem Cyphophthalmi. The Cyphophthalmi stem then diversified into Cyphophthalmi proper and Tetrophthalmi, while the Phalangida split into Laniatores and the "Palpatores". Finally, the Palpatores diversified into Eupnoi and Dyspnoi. The analysis moves the divergence of the extant suborders from the Devonian Period to the Carboniferous. The opiliones' own divergence is dated to 414 million years ago, and arachnids are estimated to have originated during the late Cambrian to early Ordovician.

Genetic analysis performed on a modern Phalangium opilio specimen found a suppressed gene that, if active, would generate a second pair of eyes at the lateral location, providing independent evidence that four eyes is the ancestral condition. Garwood et al. also argue that a Carboniferous harvestmen diversification is more consistent with changes observed in other terrestrial arthropods, which have been linked to high oxygen levels during that period.

Another recent phylogeny recovered Hastocularis as an early branching opilionid in the harvestman tree, along with the Cyphophthalmi. Eophalangium, the other genus in Garwood et al.'s Tetrophthalmi was recovered in a polytomy with the remaining oplionids, however.

The most recent phylogenetic analyses of Opiliones phylogeny have recovered Tetrophthalmi as derived members within the suborder Eupnoi, which has resulted in older ages of Opiliones diversification than previously estimated. The restoration of Eophangium sheari, the oldest known Opiliones fossil, to membership in Eupnoi is consistent with the original description of this species as a true daddy-longlegs.
