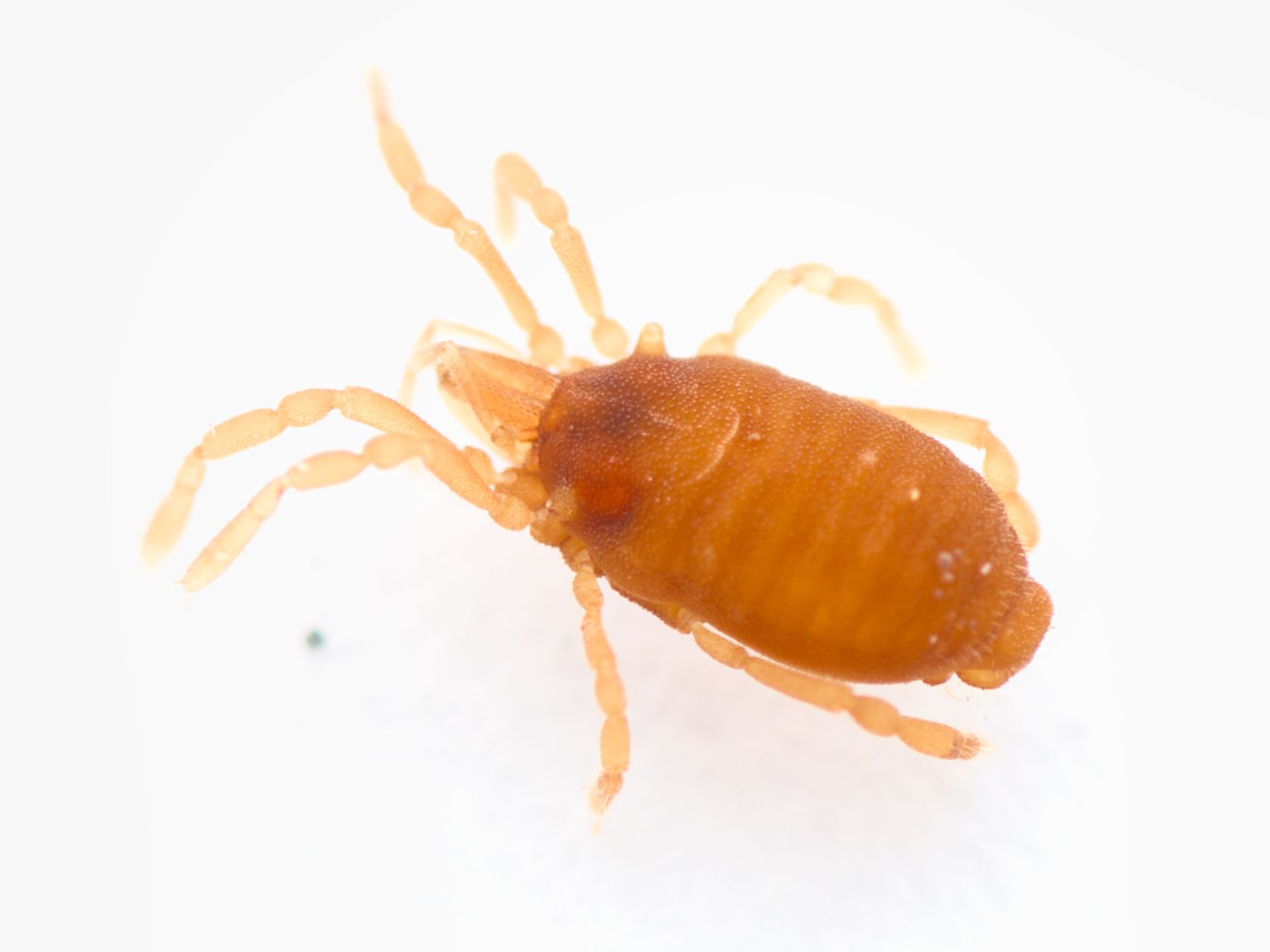
- Siro rubens

Scientific classification
- Kingdom: Animalia
- Phylum: Arthropoda
- Subphylum: Chelicerata
- Class: Arachnida
- Order: Opiliones
- Suborder: Cyphophthalmi
- Infraorder: Boreophthalmi; Giribet et al., 2012

Diversity
- 16 genera, >110 species

= Boreophthalmi =

Infraorder of arachnids

Boreophthalmi is an infraorder of mite harvestmen containing two families: Sironidae and Stylocellidae.
