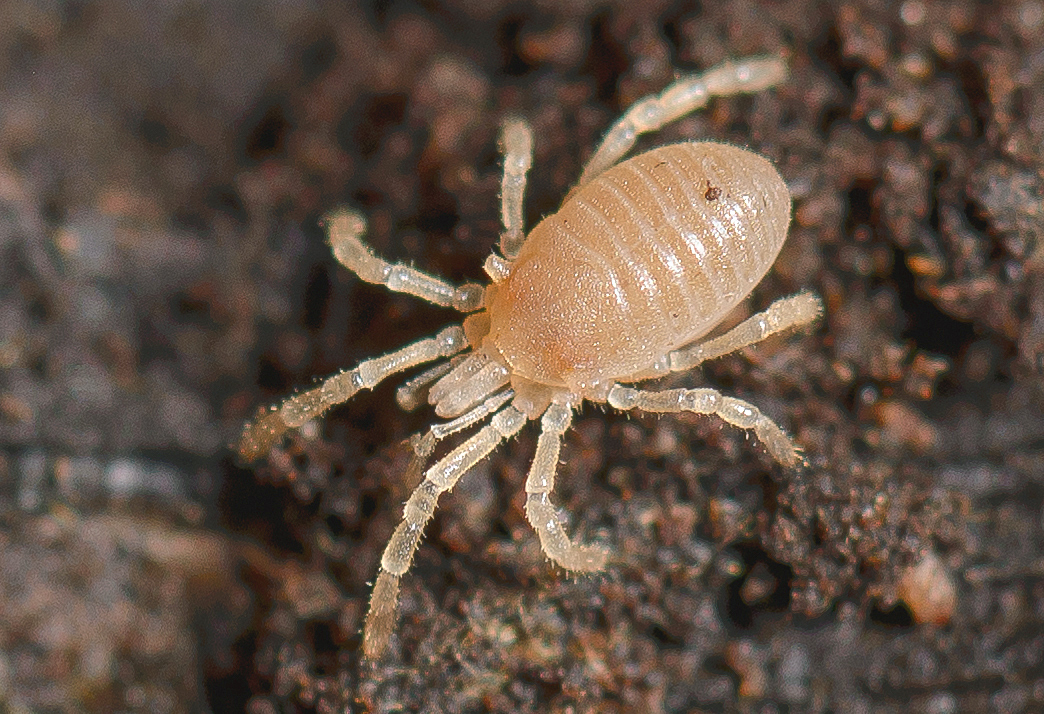
- Immature Metasiro sassafrasensis

Scientific classification
- Kingdom: Animalia
- Phylum: Arthropoda
- Subphylum: Chelicerata
- Class: Arachnida
- Order: Opiliones
- Family: Neogoveidae
- Genus: Metasiro; Juberthie, 1960

Synonyms
- Floridogovea Hoffman, 1963

= Metasiro =

Genus of harvestmen/daddy longlegs

Metasiro is a genus of mite harvestmen in the family Neogoveidae. There are at least three described species in Metasiro.

== Species ==
These three species belong to the genus Metasiro:

- Metasiro americanus (Davis, 1933)
- Metasiro sassafrasensis Clouse & Wheeler, 2014
- Metasiro savannahensis Clouse & Wheeler, 2014
