= Ozopore =

Opening of a defensive gland present in some arthropods

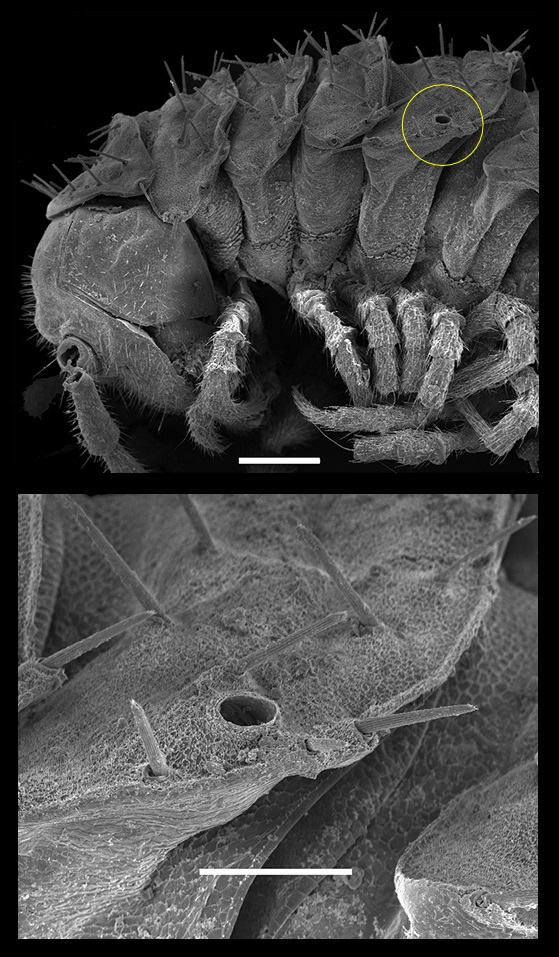
Above: Ozopore (circled) of the millipede Martensodesmus cattienensis. Below: ozopore magnified.

An ozopore is the opening of a defensive gland present in some arthropods, notably in millipedes of the order Polydesmida and in harvestmen, the eight-legged arachnids also known as "daddy long-legs". The glands themselves are known as ozadenes, also called "scent glands", "repugnatorial glands", "odoriferous glands" or "stink glands" by various authors. The name is derived from Ancient Greek ozo "smell" and Latin porus "pore, small opening".

== Harvestmen ==
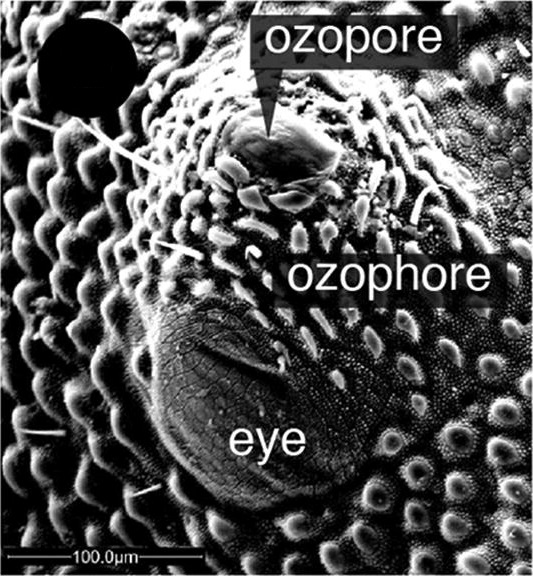
Ozopore on an elevated ozophore above the eye of Pettalus (Cyphophthalmi)

In harvestmen, ozopores are located at the anterior sides of the prosoma.

The defensive secretions emitted also act as an alarm pheromone. The glands are infoldings of the body wall, consisting of three layers. Although the glands themselves have no musculature, there is associated musculature present, which is most elaborate in the harvestman suborder Cyphophthalmi. Eupnoi and Dyspnoi have the most reduced muscular system.

This defensive behavior is considered most effective in the suborders Cyphophthalmi and Laniatores.

In the suborder Cyphophthalmi, the ozopores are located on special ozophores, specialized elevated cones.

Many different compounds have been found in various studied harvestman secretions. The chemical composition of the secretions seems to be useful in taxonomic recognition. In the Laniatores, Gonyleptoidea produce alkylated benzoquinones and phenols, and Travunioidea produce mainly terpenoids. In the Eupnoi, the Sclerosomatidae secrete short-chain acyclic ketones and alcohols, and the Phalangiidae, naphthoquinones.

== Millipedes ==
In millipedes, ozopores are repeated serially on body segments, and usually situated laterally. Exceptions are members of the order Glomerida, which have ozopores located dorsally. Some members of the order Julida have especially prominent ozadenes.

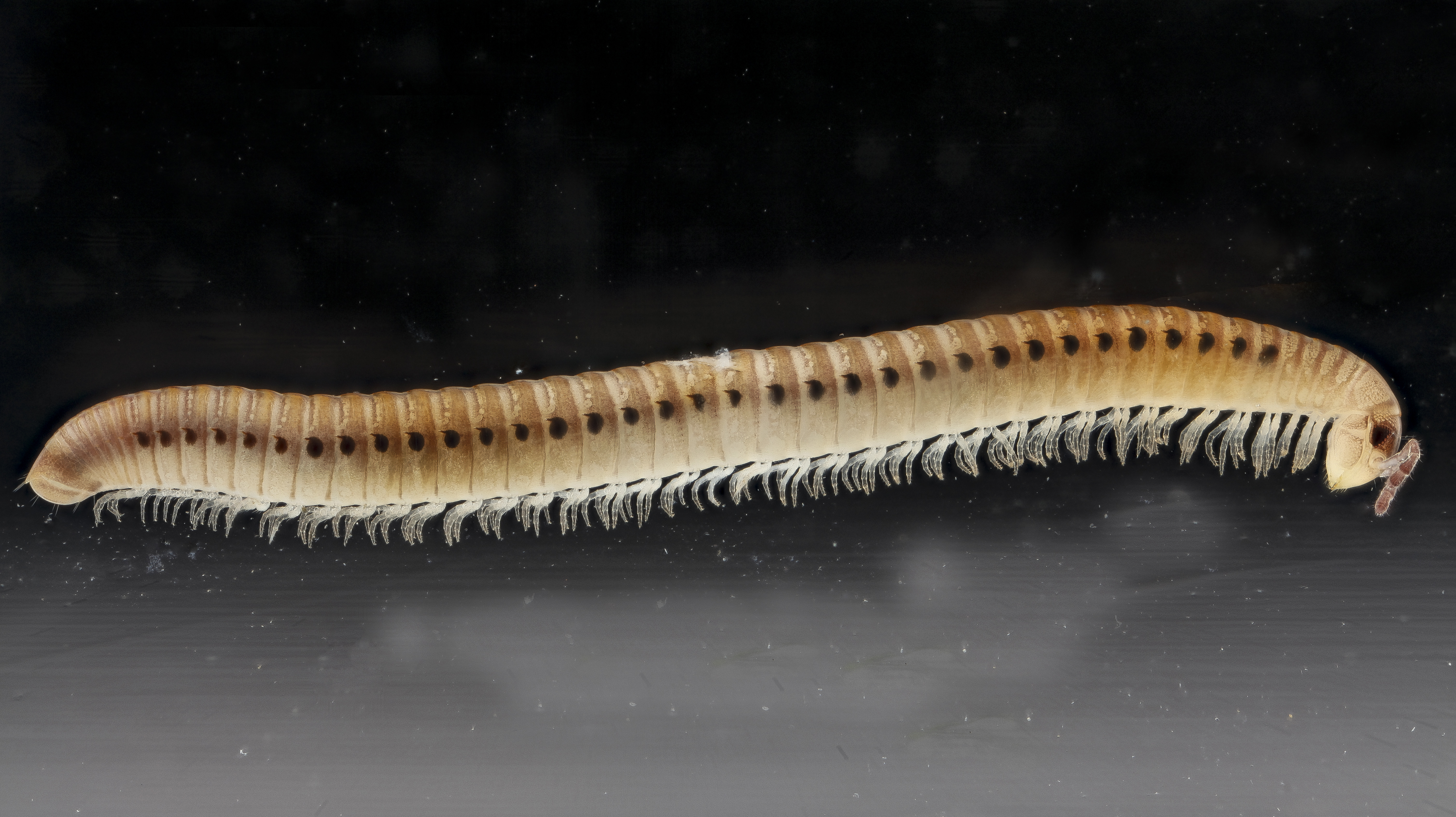
A julidan millipede with prominent ozadenes

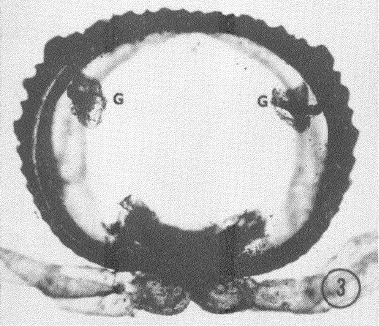
Ozadenes (G) on the inside of a millipede segment
