= Canga renatae =

Scientific classification
- Kingdom: Animalia
- Phylum: Arthropoda
- Subphylum: Chelicerata
- Class: Arachnida
- Order: Opiliones
- Family: Neogoveidae
- Genus: Canga; DaSilva, Pinto-da-Rocha & Giribet, 2010
- Species: C. renatae

Binomial name
- Canga renatae DaSilva, Pinto-da-Rocha & Giribet, 2010

Species of harvestman/daddy longlegs

Canga renatae is a species in a monotypic genus of harvestmen in the family Neogoveidae. It was discovered in 2010 in a cave system in the Serra dos Carajás, Pará State, Brazil.
