= Huitaca (goddess) =

Goddess in Muisca religion of South America

- Witchcraft, sexual liberation, arts, dance, music and Moon
- Member of Muisca religion
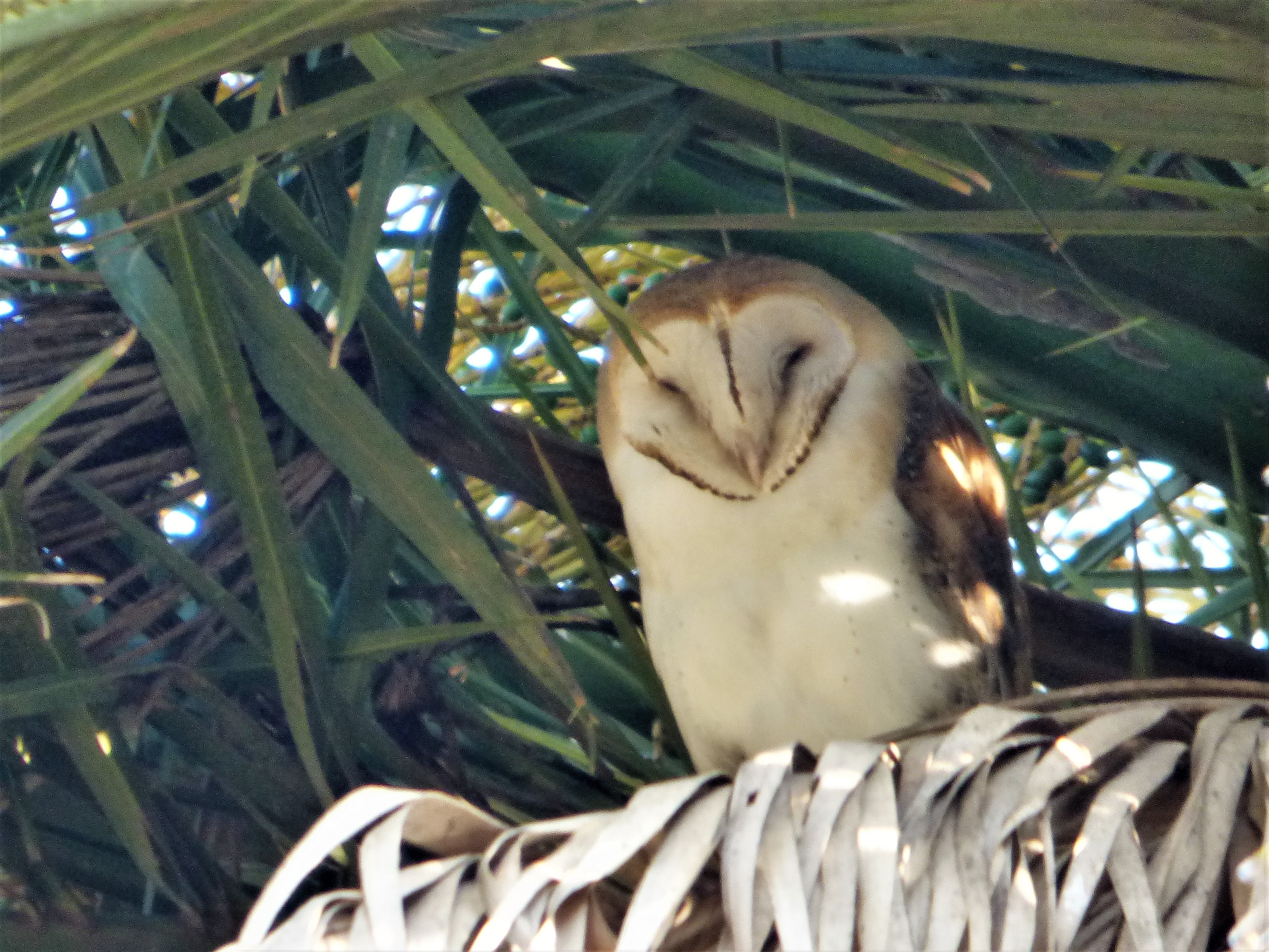
- Huitaca was cursed by Bochica and turned into a white owl
- Other names: Xubchasgagua
- Affiliation: Chía; Bachué; Nencatacoa; Chaquén
- Animals: Owl
- Region: Altiplano Cundiboyacense
- Ethnic group: Muisca
- Consort: Bochica

Huitaca or Xubchasgagua was a rebelling goddess in the religion of the Muisca. The Muisca and their confederation were a civilization who inhabited the Altiplano Cundiboyacense in the Andes. Huitaca has been described by the chroniclers Juan de Castellanos in his Elegías de varones ilustres de Indias, Lucas Fernández de Piedrahita and Pedro Simón.

== Spellings and names ==
- Huitaca
- Huythaca
- Guitaca
- Xubchasgagua
- Jubchrasguaya
- Yubecayguaya

== Description ==
Huitaca was the goddess of arts, dance and music, witchcraft, sexual liberation and the Moon. According to the Muisca legends Huitaca was a goddess of extreme beauty who praised a life full of joy, games, pleasure and drunkenness who was rebelling against the patriarchal Bochica upon which he turned her into a white owl.

Some chroniclers state Huitaca was another name for Moon goddess Chía or Bachué, mother goddess of the Muisca.

=== Huitaca in modern art ===
Sculptor Julia Merizalde Price has made a sculpture honouring Huitaca, picturing her after the curse of Bochica.
Photographer Carlos Saavedra has made an exposition showing different indigenous women of Colombia in his search for Huitaca.

=== Named after Huitaca ===
- Huitaca, a genus of Opiliones
  - Huitaca boyacaensis, a species in this genus, species name derived from Boyacá, former Muisca territory
  - Huitaca ventralis, the type species of the genus Huitaca
  - Huitaca bitaco
  - Huitaca caldas
  - Huitaca depressa
  - Huitaca sharkeyi
  - Huitaca tama

== See also ==
- Muisca women
- List of lunar deities
