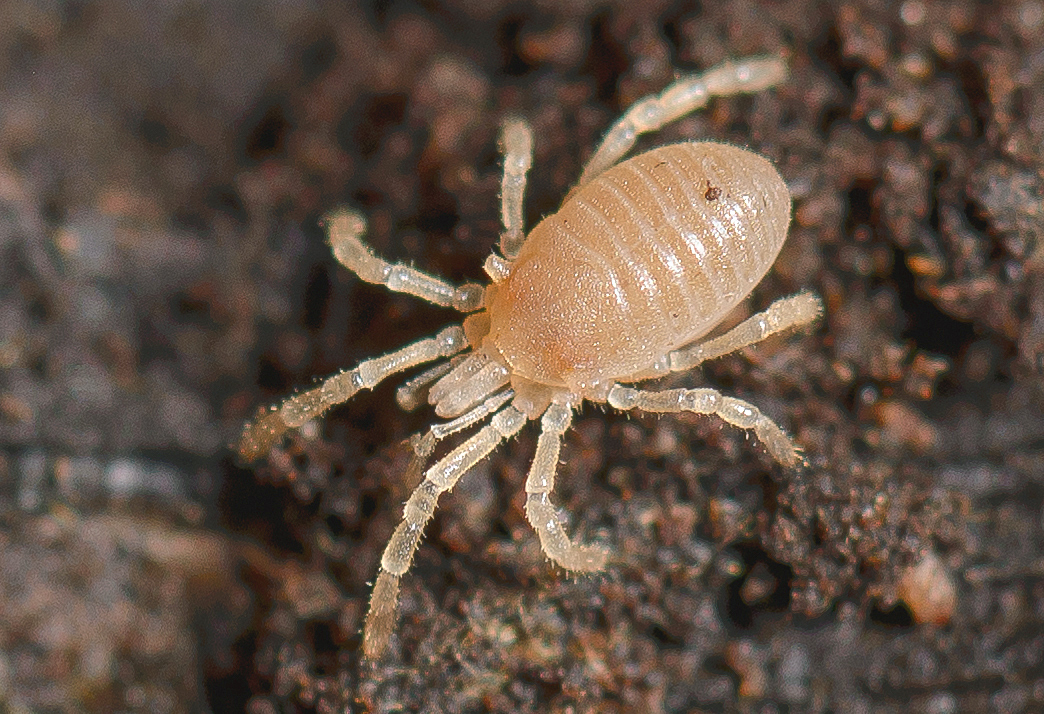
- Immature

Scientific classification
- Domain: Eukaryota
- Kingdom: Animalia
- Phylum: Arthropoda
- Subphylum: Chelicerata
- Class: Arachnida
- Order: Opiliones
- Family: Neogoveidae
- Genus: Metasiro
- Species: M. sassafrasensis

Binomial name
- Metasiro sassafrasensis Clouse & Wheeler, 2014

= Metasiro sassafrasensis =

Species of harvestman/daddy longlegs

Metasiro sassafrasensis is a species of mite harvestman in the family Neogoveidae. It is found in North America.
