= Dromopoda =

Scientific classification
- Kingdom: Animalia
- Phylum: Arthropoda
- Subphylum: Chelicerata
- Class: Arachnida
- Subclass: Dromopoda; Shultz, 1990

Orders
- Opiliones; Pseudoscorpionida; Scorpiones; Solifugae

Subclass of arachnids

Dromopoda is a proposed subclass of the arachnids, including the Opiliones (harvestmen), Scorpions, Pseudoscorpions and Solifugae ("camel spiders"). The latter three are sometimes grouped as Novogenuata. This taxon was first proposed by Jeffrey Shultz in 1990 based on morphological analysis. A combined morphological and molecular analysis in 1998 supported the monophyly of Dromopoda. However, subsequent molecular and combined analyses have not supported the monophyly of Dromopoda.
