= Ogovea =

Scientific classification
- Kingdom: Animalia
- Phylum: Arthropoda
- Subphylum: Chelicerata
- Class: Arachnida
- Order: Opiliones
- Suborder: Cyphophthalmi
- Infraorder: Sternophthalmi
- Family: Ogoveidae; Shear, 1980
- Genus: Ogovea; Roewer, 1923

Type species
- Ogovea grossa Hansen & Sørensen, 1904

Diversity
- 1 genus, 3 species
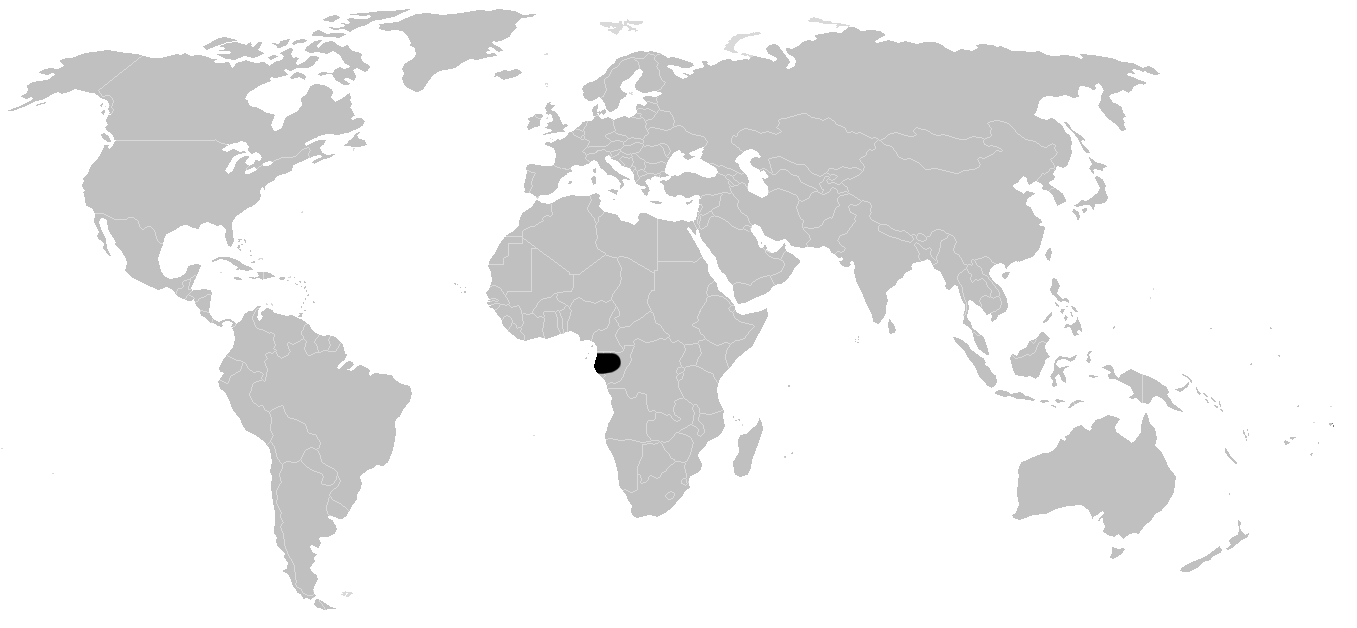

Family of harvestmen/daddy longlegs

Ogoveidae is a family of harvestmen with three described species in one genus, Ogovea, which is found in equatorial West Africa.

== Name ==
The name of the genus giving the family its name refers to the river Ogooué, where the type species was found. The genus was originally named Ogovia Hansen & Sørensen, 1904, but later renamed Ogovea Roewer, 1923, as the original name already belonged to a genus of Noctuid moths.

== Description ==
Ogoveidae are moderately sized Cyphophthalmi, at 3.4 to 5 mm long, and dark reddish-brown in color as adults. Like most members of the Sternophthalmi, they are completely eyeless, exhibit opisthosomal exocrine glands located on the sternum, and possess a complete corona analis (fusion of sternites 8 & 9, and tergite 9), as well as laterally projecting ozophores.

Their body is covered with distinct granulations, as well as a variety of different types of sensory hairs and structures, including a solea (modified area with a high concentration of sensory setae) on the first pair of tarsi. The chelicerae exhibit a smooth, robust, second segment, as well as a dorsal crest, small ventral process, and large, uniform, nodular teeth. They can be distinguished from other families of Sternophthalmi by the smooth tarsal claws on the second tarsi, as well as a conspicuous opisthosomal median furrow, more distinct than that of some Neogoveids, and a short, thornlike, triangular adenostyle.

=== Synapomorphies ===
Ogoveidae also possesses several unique apomorphies, including a conspicuous, posteriorly projecting apophysis associated with the sternal exocrine glands, a conspicuous, anteriorly projecting tricuspidate process located along the front of the prosomal carapace, a modified, compressed pedipalpal femur that allows the pedipalps to fold over the chelicerae, and unique structures known as Hansen's organs. Hansen's organs appear as circular, raised, smooth patches of cuticle, and can be found on the legs, coxae and the underside of the opisthosoma. The exact function of the Hansen's organ is currently unknown, although they are thought to be associated with some sensory function.

=== Spermatopositor ===
Ogoveids possess a characteristic spermatopositor, with a uniquely complex setation pattern, consisting of 4-5 rows of short setae on the ventral plate, and 4 short setae in a single row located apically on the median plate. The dorsal setae are long, and form 2 groups.

== Distribution ==
Ogoveidae is very geographically conserved, found only in tropical rain forests of equatorial West Africa. So far, it is known from 3 different nations: Cameroon, Equatorial Guinea, and, likely, Gabon. All 3 species are known only from their type locality, and it is possible the range of the family extends considerably further than is known.

== Relationships ==
Ogoveidae was erected as a family in 1980, originally consisting of 2 genera, Ogovea and Huitaca, though in 2003 Huitaca was transferred to the related family Neogoveidae.

These 2 families make up the superfamily Ogoveoidea, which is the sister group to Troglosironidae. Troglosironidae and Ogoveoidea together make up the infraorder Sternophthalmi, which is well supported as monophyletic by recent phylogenetic analyses. However, no cladistic analysis has been conducted to resolve the internal phylogeny of the family.

== Species ==
=== Ogovea cameroonensis Giribet & Prieto, 2003 ===
This species was discovered near Yaoundé, in Cameroon, considerably extending the range of the genus northwards. It is known from 19 specimens, all collected at the same locality.

This is the largest of the three species by a wide margin, reaching up to 5 mm in length, and is most apparently similar to O. grossa. It can be distinguished from that species on the basis of its large size, significantly shorter anterior process, and proportionally longer chelicerae, which also exhibit a much more conspicuous dorsal crest.

=== Ogovea grossa Hansen & William Sørensen, 1904 ===
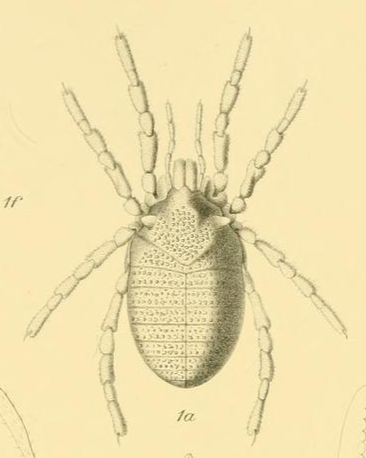
Original illustration of Ogovea grossa

The first species of the genus to be discovered, it is known only from a single female specimen collected along the Ogooué River in what was then French Equatorial Africa. However, as the Ogooué River flows through both the modern day nations of Congo and Gabon, it is unknown in which modern nation the specimen was found.

The specimen was identified as a separate genus on the basis of the anteriorly projecting process on the prosoma and compressed pedipalps; compared to the other 2 species in the genus, O. grossa is intermediate in terms of body length and the length of the anterior process. The single known specimen was 3.75 mm in length.

=== Ogovea nasuta Hansen, 1921 ===
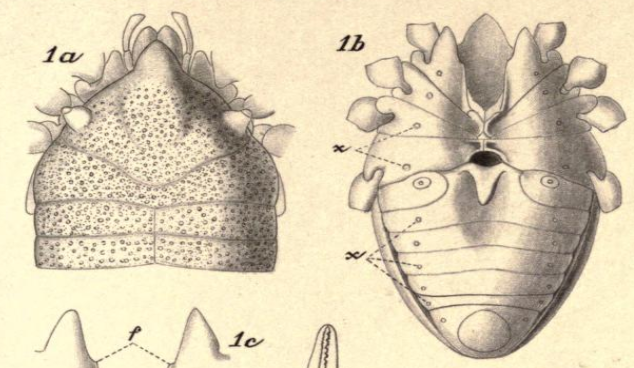
The original illustration of the dorsum of the prosoma (1a) and the venter (1b) of Ogovea nasuta. Lines indicate Hansen's organs.

This species is based on 5 specimens collected on the island of Bioko, in Equatorial Guinea, between the altitudes of 400 and 500 meters. Of the 5 specimens, 3 were adult males, allowing for the examination of sexually dimorphic characters in the family for the first time, including the characteristic ventral posterior apophysis of the male. Of the other 2, 1 was an adult female, and 1 was an immature.

This species was distinguished from O. grossa primarily due to the significantly longer and broader anterior process, significantly shorter legs, proportionally longer solea, and a different granulation pattern. This species is also the smallest of the known species of Ogovea, with the single female specimen being 3.52 mm in length and the males being slightly smaller than that.
