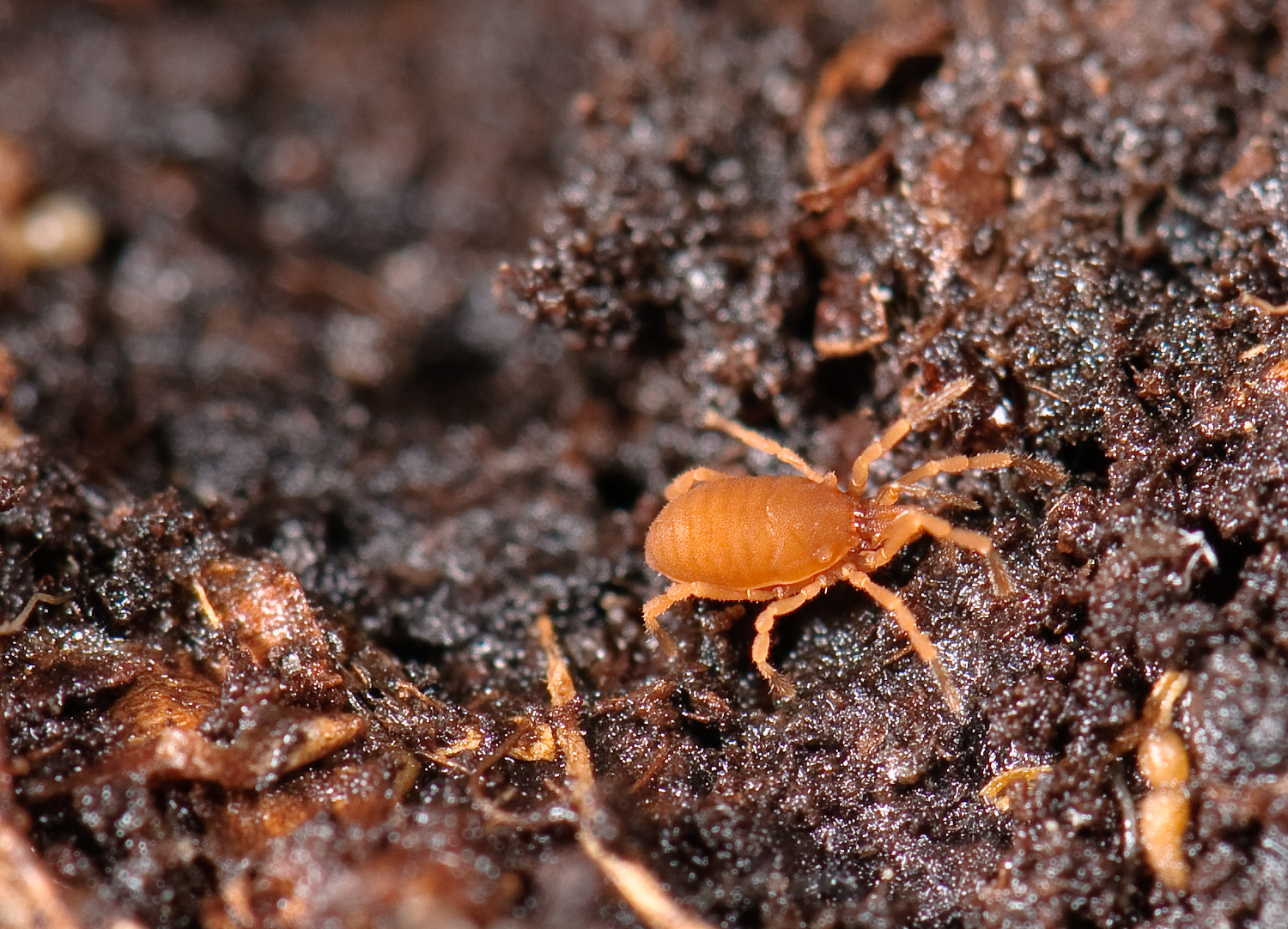
- Siro sp., USA

Scientific classification
- Kingdom: Animalia
- Phylum: Arthropoda
- Subphylum: Chelicerata
- Class: Arachnida
- Order: Opiliones
- Suborder: Cyphophthalmi; Simon, 1879

Infraorders
- Boreophthalmi; Scopulophthalmi; Sternophthalmi

Diversity
- 6 families, > 200 species

= Cyphophthalmi =

Cyphophthalmi Temporal range: 99–0 Ma Late Cretaceous-Present

Suborder of harvestmen/daddy longlegs

Cyphophthalmi is a suborder of harvestmen, colloquially known as mite harvestmen. Cyphophthalmi comprises 36 genera, and more than two hundred described species. The six families are currently grouped into three infraorders: the Boreophthalmi, Scopulophthalmi, and Sternophthalmi.

== Description ==
Cyphophthalmi are smaller than the more familiar "daddy long-legs" harvestmen, with adults ranging from 1 to 7 mm in length. Moreover, their legs are relatively short compared to most other harvestmen, typically shorter than the body. Some superficially resemble mites, which is where they get their common name. Their coloration is almost always some shade of brown, with a heavily sclerotized body, and they are quite inconspicuous, residing in leaf litter or in caves. Many Cyphophthalmi are eyeless, and presumably rely on olfactory cues to find food and mates. Very little is known about their behavior, though they likely subsist mostly by scavenging and preying on minute arthropods. They have low dispersal rates and consequently high endemism.

=== Diagnostic features ===
Cyphophthalmi differ from other harvestmen in a number of key ways. Like all harvestmen, they have a pair of ozopores located on the sides of the prosoma. Unlike other harvestmen, however, the ozopores in Cyphophthalmi are located on elevated cone-shaped structures known as ozophores. Although members of most families are eyeless, most members of the families Pettalidae and Stylocellidae do have eyes located on or near the ozophores. These eyes, however, are not homologous to the eyes of other harvestmen, and are instead derived from ancestral lateral eyes, instead of ancestral median eyes, as is the case for other harvestmen. The male genitalia of Cyphophthalmi is unique among harvestmen, as males lack a true penis, and instead have a short spermatopositor, a structure which is not inserted inside the female, but used to deposit a spermatophore. In addition, they are the only harvestmen to lack a genital operculum, and instead exhibit a completely open gonopore. Mating in Cyphophthalmi is not well studied, but in some species at least, males and females do engage in direct contact. They further differ from most harvestmen in that the first 8 opisthosomal tergites and the prosomal carapace are fused together in what is known as a scutum completum, although this feature is also known from the unrelated family Sandokanidae.

=== Sexual dimorphisms ===
Like most animals, Cyphophthalmi express morphological distinctions between male and female individuals. Male Cyphophthalmi possess a structure on their fourth pair of tarsi known as an adenostyle. The adenostyle usually appears as a small hornlike projection, but can take a variety of shapes, depending on species. The function of the adenostyle is currently unknown, but is presumably associated with chemical glands. Aside from the adenostyle, males in many species possess glandular pores on either the underside of the opisthosoma or the anal region, although these glands are not present in all species. Males in several families also possess structural modifications of the anal plate and males of certain species in the family Stylocellidae possess a modified patch of cuticle near the adenostyle known as the Rambla's organ. The exact function of these glands and structures is currently unknown.

=== Chemical defenses ===
Like most harvestmen, Cyphophthalmi rely heavily on chemical secretions for defense. This defensive character is particularly well developed in Cyphophthalmi, when compared to the more familiar Eupnoi and Dyspnoi. Cyphophthalmi possess more elaborate musculature associated with the defensive glands than other harvestmen, and the secretions, which primarily consist of a variety of naphthoquinones and ketones, are thought to be more potent than in Eupnoi and Dyspnoi.

== Distribution ==
Cyphophthalmids are found on all continents, with the exception of Antarctica, where they probably also once lived. As they did not disperse onto any oceanic islands, and it is believed that they did not travel between separate landmasses, they make an interesting subject for biogeography. Each of the six currently recognized families has a distinct distribution:

- Stylocellidae: found from India to New Guinea
- Ogoveidae: found exclusively in West Africa
- Neogoveidae: found in Neotropical ecosystems between Florida and Ecuador, and in western equatorial Africa
- Pettalidae: found in South America, South Africa, Sri Lanka, Australia and New Zealand, demonstrating a Gondwanan distribution.
- Sironidae: found in temperate Europe, North America, and Japan, demonstrating a Laurasian distribution
- Troglosironidae: found exclusively in New Caledonia.

Colombia shows the largest diversity of cyphophthalmids among countries in South America. This could reflect the large number of ecosystems found there, but could also be due to a high rate of sampling in this country.

== Fossil record ==
A fossil cyphophthalmid assigned to a modern genus, Siro platypedibus Dunlop & Giribet, 2003 (Sironidae), was described from Paleogene aged Bitterfeld amber of eastern Germany. Another of this genus was described from Eocene Baltic amber as Siro balticus Dunlop & Mitov, 2011. A third fossil, Palaeosiro burmanicum Poinar, 2008, has been described from the Cretaceous (Cenomanian) aged Burmese amber. It was also assigned to Sironidae but is now thought to belong to Stylocellidae (a more typical Asian family). As the fossil record for Cyphophthalmi is so sparse, recent studies have attempted to predict the diversification time of the suborder by using molecular clocks and comparing gene sequences among living taxa. One 2012 study estimated the earliest diversification of the suborder at approximately 332 MYA, in the Carboniferous. Another study, in 2014, recovered a diversification age of approximately 340 MYA. A more recent study in 2017, however, recovered the diversification of the modern Cyphophthalmi lineages to have occurred more recently, during the Jurassic, with the emergence of the suborder as a whole at less than 300 MYA.

== Relationships ==
Cyphophthalmi is one of the two major lineages of harvestmen; the other, containing the Laniatores, Dyspnoi and Eupnoi, is known as Phalangida. The extinct suborder, Tetrophthalmi, shares several features in common with Cyphophthalmi, and these two suborders may represent sister taxa. They are grouped into the following infraorders: Boreophthalmi, Scopulophthalmi, and Sternophthalmi. The Boreophthalmi and Sternophthalmi together form a monophyletic clade, and comprise 5 of the 6 families of Cyphphthalmi. The Scopulophthalmi, with only 1 family, the Pettalidae, forms the sister group to all the other families. Within the Sternophthalmi, the families Ogoveidae and Neogoveidae are most closely related, and form the superfamily Ogoveoidea, which is the sister group to the family Troglosironidae. The systematics of the Boreophthalmi, however, is not yet fully resolved. In one recent analysis, the Boreophthalmi were recovered as paraphyletic with respect to the Sternophthalmi. Even within the Boreophthalmi, the Sironidae has been recovered either as sister family to Stylocellidae, or as paraphyletic with respect to Stylocellidae. In addition, there are 3 genera of Cyphophthalmi with uncertain affinities that have not been placed in any family or infraorder.

- Cyphophthalmi
  - Scopulophthalmi
    Pettalidae
  - - Boreophthalmi
      - Sironidae
      - Stylocellidae
    - Sternophthalmi
      - Ogoveoidea
        - Neogoveidae
        - Ogoveidae
      - Troglosironidae

Recovered by Giribet et al. (2012)

- Cyphophthalmi
  - Scopulophthalmi
    Pettalidae
  - - Stylocellidae
    - - Sironidae
      - Sternophthalmi
        - Ogoveoidea
          - Neogoveidae
          - Ogoveidae
        - Troglosironidae

Recovered by Fernandez et al. (2017)

== Taxonomy ==
=== History of taxonomy ===
Originally, Cyphophthalmi was recognized as a single family consisting of two subfamilies, Sironini and Stylocellini. This classification scheme existed until 1980, when a new taxonomy was proposed, separating 5 families into the now-defunct infraorders Temperophthalmi (consisting of Petallidae, Sironidae and, later, Troglosironidae) and Tropicophthalmi (consisting of Stylocellidae, Ogoveidae and Neogoveidae). These two infraorders were never recovered as monophyletic in subsequent studies, and, following a 2012 phylogenetic analysis, a new Cyphophthalmi taxonomy was proposed.

=== Current taxonomy ===
The Cyphophthalmi are currently represented by the following taxa, which represent approximately 157 species, although there are a significant number of undescribed species that have been collected, and the current number of species is believed to be a severe under-representation. The monophyly of most subgroups of Cyphophthalmi is well supported, although both Boreophthalmi and Sironidae have been recovered as paraphyletic in recent analyses.

- Boreophthalmi Giribet, Sharma, Boyer, Clouse, de Bivort, Dimitrov, Kawauchi, Murienne & Schwendinger, 2012 – 110 species, 23 genera
  - Parasironidae Karaman, Mitov & Snegovaya, 2024 – 7 species, 4 genera
  - Sironidae Leach, 1816 – 60 species, 9 genera
  - Stylocellidae Hansen & Sørensen, 1904 – 43 species, 10 genera
- Scopulophthalmi Giribet, Sharma, Boyer, Clouse, de Bivort, Dimitrov, Kawauchi, Murienne & Schwendinger, 2012 – 84 species, 11 genera
  - Pettalidae Shear, 1980 – 84 species, 11 genera
- Sternophthalmi Giribet, Sharma, Boyer, Clouse, de Bivort, Dimitrov, Kawauchi, Murienne & Schwendinger, 2012 – 60 species, 14 genera
  - Neogoveidae Shear, 1980 – 40 species, 11 genera
  - Ogoveidae Shear, 1980 – 3 species, 1 genus
  - Troglosironidae Shear, 1993 – 17 species, 1 genus
- Incertae sedis
  - Ankaratra Shear & Gruber, 1996 – 1 species
  - Marwe Shear, 1985 – 1 species
  - Shearogovea Giribet, 2011 – 1 species

== See also ==
- Harvestman phylogeny
- List of Cyphophthalmi species
