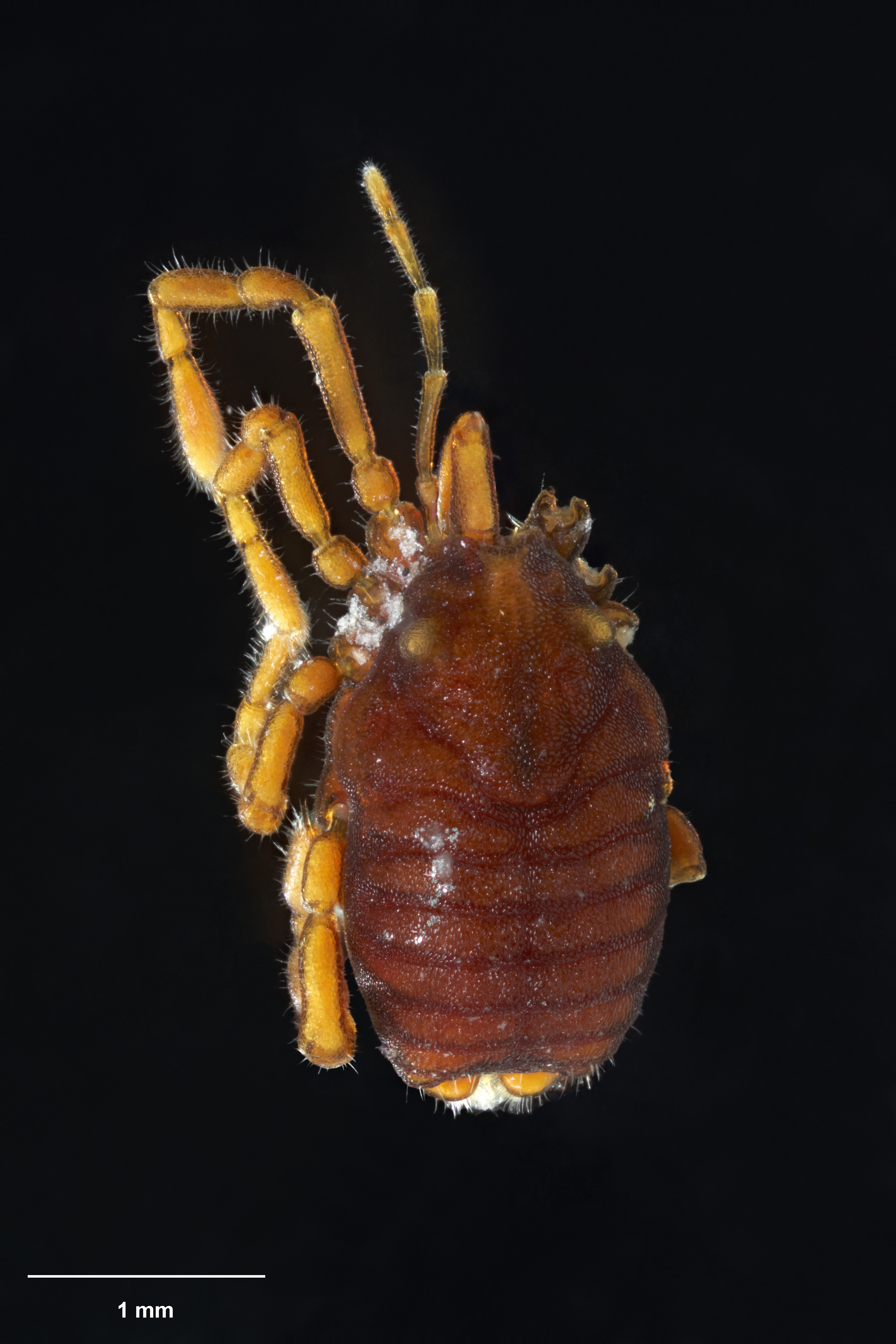
- Rakaia sorenseni (Museum of New Zealand Te Papa Tongarewa)

Scientific classification
- Kingdom: Animalia
- Phylum: Arthropoda
- Subphylum: Chelicerata
- Class: Arachnida
- Order: Opiliones
- Family: Pettalidae
- Genus: Rakaia; Hirst, 1926

Type species
- Rakaia antipodiana Hirst, 1926

Diversity
- 18 species

= Rakaia (harvestman) =

Genus of harvestmen/daddy longlegs

Rakaia is a genus of harvestmen in the family Pettalidae with eighteen described species (as of 2023). All species are found in New Zealand.

== Taxonomy ==
The genus Rakaia was described by Hirst, 1926 with the type species Rakaia antipodiana Hirst, 1926. In the past, additional species since placed in Aoraki or Austropurcellia were once included.

== Species ==
These species belong to the genus Rakaia:

- Rakaia antipodiana Hirst, 1926 – New Zealand
- Rakaia australis Forster, 1952 – New Zealand
- Rakaia collaris Roewer, 1942 – New Zealand
- Rakaia digitata Forster, 1952 – New Zealand
- Rakaia dorothea Phillipps & Grimmett, 1932 – New Zealand
- Rakaia florensis Forster, 1948 – New Zealand
- Rakaia insula Forster, 1952 – New Zealand
- Rakaia isolata Forster, 1952 – New Zealand
- Rakaia lindsayi Forster, 1952 – New Zealand
- Rakaia macra Boyer & Giribet, 2003 – New Zealand
- Rakaia magna Forster, 1948 – New Zealand
- Rakaia media Forster, 1948 – New Zealand
- Rakaia minutissima Forster, 1948 – New Zealand
- Rakaia pauli Forster, 1952 – New Zealand
- Rakaia solitaria Forster, 1948 – New Zealand
- Rakaia sorenseni Forster, 1952 – New Zealand
- Rakaia stewartiensis Forster, 1948 – New Zealand
- Rakaia uniloca Forster, 1952 – New Zealand

== Etymology ==
The genus is feminine.
