= Ozophore =

Arachnid organ

An ozophore is an elevated cone present in the harvestman ("daddy long-legs") suborder Cyphophthalmi. It carries the openings, called ozopores, of the defensive glands that are present in many harvestmen.

The name is derived from Ancient Greek ozo "smell" and phorein "to bear".
