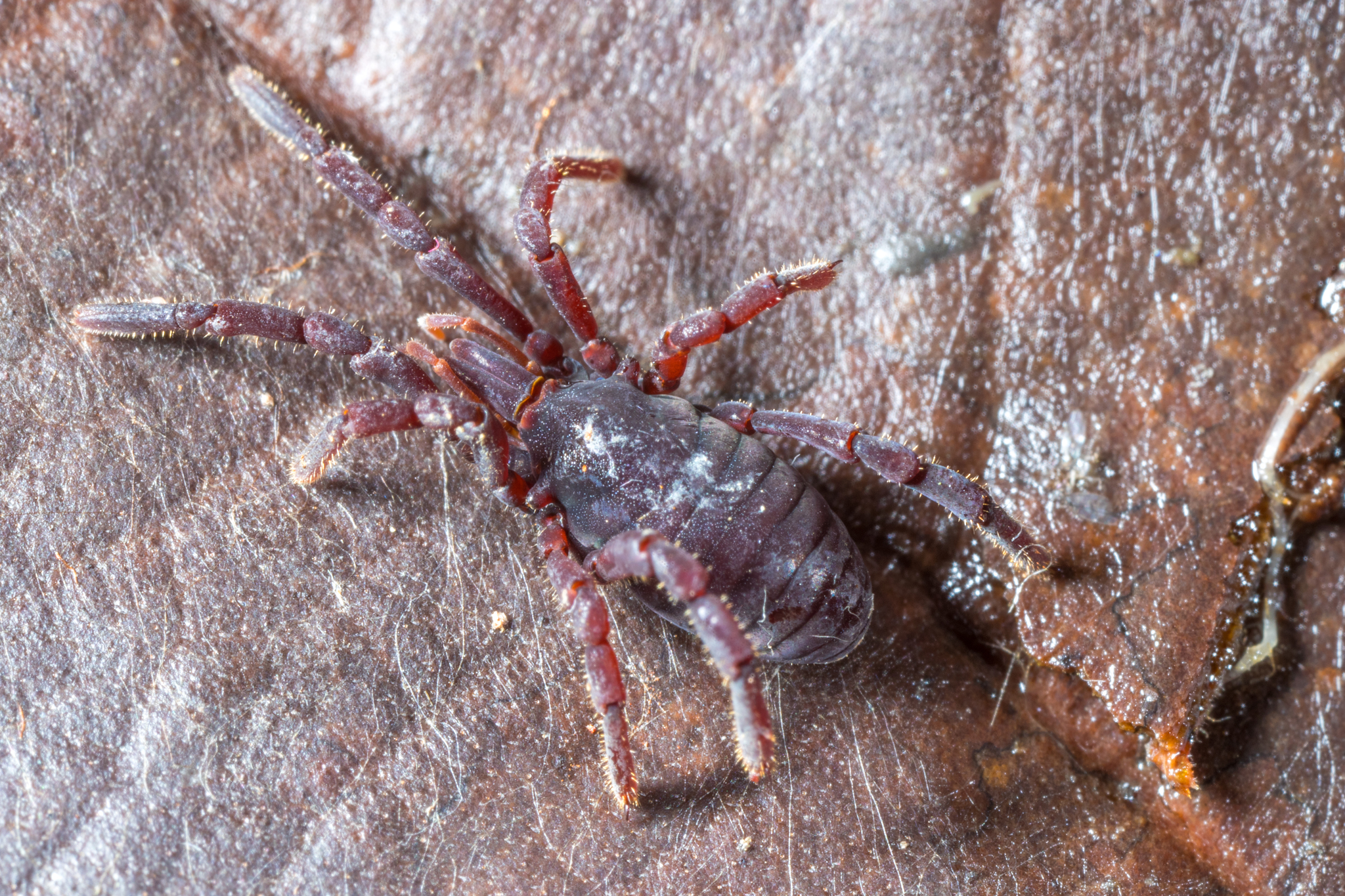
- Leptopsalis sp.

Scientific classification
- Domain: Eukaryota
- Kingdom: Animalia
- Phylum: Arthropoda
- Subphylum: Chelicerata
- Class: Arachnida
- Order: Opiliones
- Suborder: Cyphophthalmi
- Infraorder: Boreophthalmi
- Family: Stylocellidae; Hansen & Sørensen, 1904

Genera
- See text

Diversity
- 6 genera, c. 40 species
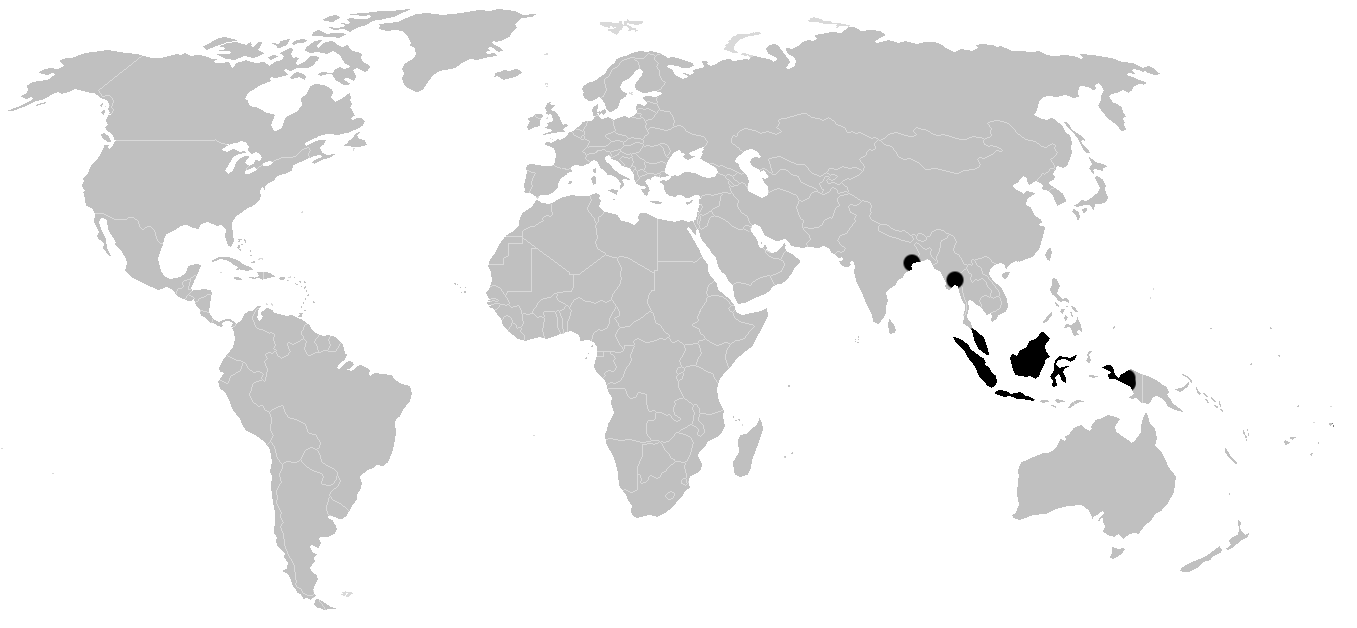

= Stylocellidae =

Stylocellidae Temporal range: Cretaceous–present

Family of harvestmen/daddy longlegs

The Stylocellidae are a family of harvestmen with about 40 described species, all of which occur in Southern or Southeastern Asia. Members of this family are from one to seven millimeters long. While Stylocellus species have eyes, these are absent in the other two genera.

== Name ==
The name of the type genus is combined from Ancient Greek stylos "pillar" and Latin ocellus "eye", referring to the elongated shape of the animal, compared to Sironidae, and the presence of eyes.

== Species ==
For complete breakdown, see the following (as of 2023):

For a broader recent listing of species see:

=== Fangensinae ===
- Fangensis Rambla, 1994

- Fangensis cavernarus Schwendinger & Giribet, 2005 – Thailand
- Fangensis leclerci Rambla, 1994 – Thailand
- Fangensis spelaeus Schwendinger & Giribet, 2005 – Thailand

- Giribetia Clouse, 2012

- Giribetia insulanus (Schwendinger & Giribet, 2005) – Thailand

=== Leptopsalidinae ===
- Leptopsalis Thorell, 1882

- Leptopsalis beccarii Thorell, 1882 – Indonesia (Sumatra)
- †Leptopsalis breyeri Bartel, Dunlop & Giribet, 2023 – Myanmar
- Leptopsalis dumoga (Shear, 1993) – Indonesia (Sulawesi)
- Leptopsalis foveolata Clouse & Schwendinger, 2012 – Thailand
- Leptopsalis hillyardi (Shear, 1993) – Indonesia (Sulawesi)
- Leptopsalis javana (Thorell, 1882) – Indonesia (Java)
- Leptopsalis laevichelis (Roewer, 1942) – Malaysia
- Leptopsalis lydekkeri (Clouse & Giribet, 2007) – West Papua
- Leptopsalis modesta (Hansen & Sørensen, 1904) – Indonesia (Sulawesi)
- Leptopsalis novaguinea (Clouse & Giribet, 2007) – West Papua
- Leptopsalis pangrango (Shear, 1993) – Indonesia (Java)
- Leptopsalis ramblae (Giribet, 2002) – Singapore
- Leptopsalis sedgwicki (Shear, 1979) – Malaysia (Pulau Pinang)
- Leptopsalis sulcata (Hansen & Sørensen, 1904) – Indonesia (Java)
- Leptopsalis tambusisi (Shear, 1993) – Indonesia (Sulawesi)
- Leptopsalis thorellii (Hansen & Sørensen, 1904) – Indonesia (Sumatra)
- Leptopsalis weberii (Hansen & Sørensen, 1904) – Indonesia (Sumatra)

- Miopsalis Thorell, 1890

- Miopsalis collinsi (Shear, 1993) – Malaysia (Sarawak)
- Miopsalis dillyi Schmidt, Clouse & Sharma, 2020 – Philippines
- Miopsalis globosa (Schwendinger & Giribet, 2004) – Malaysia (Perak)
- Miopsalis gryllospeca (Shear, 1993) – Malaysia (Sarawak)
- Miopsalis kinabalu (Shear, 1993) – Malaysia (Sabah)
- Miopsalis leakeyi (Shear, 1993) – Malaysia (Sabah)
- Miopsalis lionota (Pocock, 1897) – Malaysia (Sabah)
- Miopsalis mulu (Shear, 1993) – Malaysia (Sarawak)
- Miopsalis pocockii (Hansen & Sørensen, 1904) – Malaysia (Sabah)
- Miopsalis pulicaria Thorell, 1890 – Malaysia (Penang)
- Miopsalis sabah (Shear, 1993) – Malaysia (Sabah)
- Miopsalis silhavyi (Rambla, 1991) – Malaysia (Sarawak)
- Miopsalis tarumpitao (Shear, 1993) – Philippines

=== Stylocellinae ===
- Meghalaya Giribet, Sharma, & Bastawade, 2007

- Meghalaya annandalei Giribet, Sharma, & Bastawade, 2007 — India (Arunachal Pradesh)

- Stylocellus Westwood, 1874

- Stylocellus lornei Clouse, 2012 – Thailand
- Stylocellus spinifrons Roewer, 1942 – Malaysia (Sarawak) (nomen dubium) [unidentifiable juvenile]
- Stylocellus sumatranus Westwood, 1874 – Indonesia (Sumatra)

- †Mesopsalis Bartel, Dunlop & Giribet, 2023
  - †Mesopsalis oblongus Bartel, Dunlop & Giribet, 2023 Burmese amber, Myanmar, Cenomanian
- †Palaeosiro Poinar 2008
  - †Palaeosiro burmanicum Poinar 2008 Burmese amber, Myanmar, Cenomanian
- †Sirocellus Bartel, Dunlop & Giribet, 2023
  - †Sirocellus iunctus Bartel, Dunlop & Giribet, 2023 Burmese amber, Myanmar, Cenomanian
