= Troglosiro =

Scientific classification
- Domain: Eukaryota
- Kingdom: Animalia
- Phylum: Arthropoda
- Subphylum: Chelicerata
- Class: Arachnida
- Order: Opiliones
- Suborder: Cyphophthalmi
- Infraorder: Sternophthalmi
- Family: Troglosironidae; Shear, 1993
- Genus: Troglosiro; Juberthie, 1979

Type species
- Troglosiro aelleni Juberthie, 1979

Diversity
- 17 species
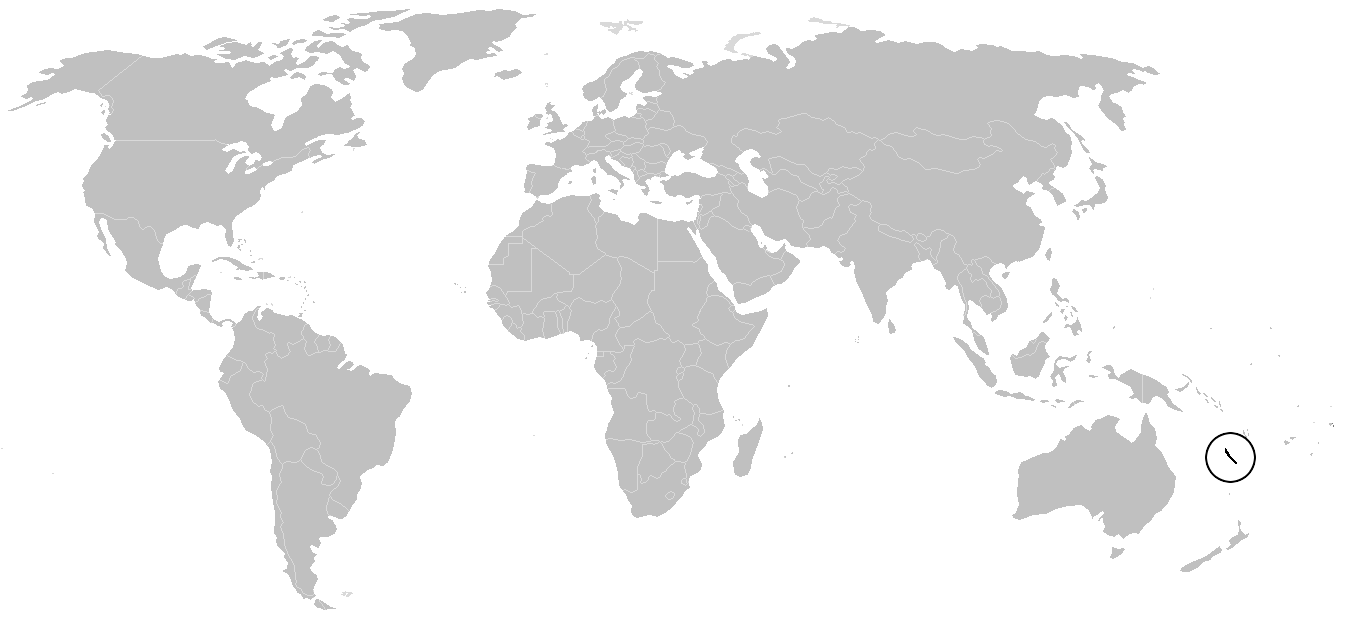

Family of harvestmen/daddy longlegs

Troglosironidae is a family of harvestmen with seventeen described species in a single genus, Troglosiro, which is found on the island of New Caledonia, in the Pacific Ocean.

== Name ==
The name of the genus giving the family its name is a combination of Ancient Greek troglos "cave", and the harvestman genus Siro, a reference to the habitat of the type specimen. Despite this, the genus does not appear to be adapted for a troglobitic lifestyle, and subsequent specimens have been collected from Berlesate (soil samples run through a Berlese funnel).

== Description ==
Troglosironidae are 1.7 to 2.5 mm long and eyeless. They have mostly smooth, robust chelicerae, with or without a dorsal crest on the basal segment. They have laterally projecting ozophores, tarsal claws on the second pair of legs with a row of teeth, no opisthosomal median furrow, and a lamelliform adenostyle. The coxae 2 are not fused to the coxae 3, but sternites 8 and 9, and tergite 9, are all fused together, forming a complete corona analis. Exocrine gland pores are located on the sternum. These gland pores form unique depressions in most species, except for those found on the northern half of the island. The spermatopositor of the males also exhibit a unique setation pattern, as well as enlarged moveable fingers with toothed margins.

== Distribution ==
Troglosironidae is found exclusively on the island of New Caledonia, although the possibility exists that they could inhabit nearby islands as well. They can be found in leaf litter across the island, in both low and high elevations.

The family is believed to be an ancient relict of a once-widespread group that managed to survive on the island, as opposed to a more recent group that dispersed across the ocean, as the dispersal ability of Cyphophthalmi in general is regarded as poor.

Species in the north of the island and the south of the island form 2 distinct lineages, indicated by morphological differences in the sternum of species collected from the 2 different regions.

== Relationships ==
Troglosironidae was erected as a family in 1993, upon the discovery of 5 additional species of the formerly monospecific Troglosiro. The family was originally placed alongside Petallidae and Sironidae in the infraorder Temperophthalmi, but later analyses recovered Troglosironidae in a close relationship with Neogoveidae and Ogoveidae, and was moved to the newly erected infraorder Sternophthalmi as the sister family to the superfamily Ogoveoidea, which contains the 2 latter families.

A cladistic analysis was conducted for the internal relationships of the family in 2009, the results of which are reproduced here. The species Troglosiro platnicki and T. tillierorum (marked with *) were not used in the study, and their position in the phylogeny is speculative, though probable based on morphological similarities. However, it has been suggested that T. platnicki may be synonymous with T. juberthiei. This study also recovered the divergence between the two lineages of Sternophthalmi (Ogoveoidea and Troglosironidae) to have occurred approximately 221 million years ago, and the family Troglosironidae to have emerged approximately 49 million years ago. Another study recovered older ages, with the divergence of the Sternophthalmi lineages to have occurred approximately 279 million years ago, with the emergence of Troglosironidae to have occurred approximately 57 million years ago. This family is thought to be the youngest Cyphophthalmi family by a wide margin, although no data exist regarding the age of Ogoveidae.

- Troglosironidae
  - - Troglosiro aelleni
    - Troglosiro sheari
    - Troglosiro tillierorum*
  - - - Troglosiro monteithi
      - - Troglosiro ninqua
        - Troglosiro oscitatio
    - - - Troglosiro wilsoni
        - - Troglosiro raveni
          - - Troglosiro longifossa
            - Troglosiro urbanus
      - - - Troglosiro brevifossa
          - Troglosiro sp.
        - Troglosiro juberthie
        - Troglosiro platnicki*

Recovered by Sharma & Giribet (2009)

== Species ==
There are currently 17 described species of Troglosiro, listed below, and some undescribed species (known only from females and juveniles) that were discovered in 2009.

- Troglosiro aelleni Juberthie, 1979 (caves, possibly only Grotte d'Adio)
- Troglosiro brevifossa Sharma & Giribet, 2009 (rainforest litter)
- Troglosiro dogny Giribet & Baker, 2021 (rainforest litter)
- Troglosiro juberthiei Shear, 1993 (montane forest litter)
- Troglosiro longifossa Sharma & Giribet, 2005 (rainforest litter)
- Troglosiro monteithi Sharma & Giribet, 2009 (rainforest litter)
- Troglosiro ninqua Shear, 1993 (humid forest litter)
- Troglosiro oscitatio Sharma & Giribet, 2009 (montane litter)
- Troglosiro pin Giribet, Baker & Sharma, 2021 (rainforest litter)
- Troglosiro platnicki Shear, 1993 (humid forest litter)
- Troglosiro pseudojuberthiei Giribet, Baker & Sharma, 2021 (rainforest litter)
- Troglosiro raveni Shear, 1993 (dry forest litter)
- Troglosiro sharmai Giribet & Baker, 2021 (rainforest litter)
- Troglosiro sheari Sharma & Giribet, 2009 (rainforest litter)
- Troglosiro tillierorum Shear, 1993 (humid forest litter)
- Troglosiro urbanus Sharma & Giribet, 2009 (forest litter)
- Troglosiro wilsoni Sharma & Giribet, 2009 (montane forest litter)
