= Huitaca (harvestman) =

Scientific classification
- Domain: Eukaryota
- Kingdom: Animalia
- Phylum: Arthropoda
- Subphylum: Chelicerata
- Class: Arachnida
- Order: Opiliones
- Family: Neogoveidae
- Genus: Huitaca; Shear, 1979

Genus of harvestmen

Huitaca is a genus of harvestmen belonging to the family Neogoveidae.

The species of this genus are found in Southern America.

Species:

- Huitaca bitaco Benavides & Giribet, 2013
- Huitaca boyacaensis Benavides & Giribet, 2013
- Huitaca caldas Benavides & Giribet, 2013
- Huitaca depressa Benavides & Giribet, 2013
- Huitaca sharkeyi Benavides & Giribet, 2013
- Huitaca tama Benavides & Giribet, 2013
- Huitaca ventralis Shear, 1979
