= List of Phalangodidae species =

This is a list of the described species of the harvestman family Phalangodidae. The data is largely taken from Joel Hallan's Biology Catalog, later superseded by the World Catalog of Opiliones.

- Ausobskya Martens, 1972 — Greece

- Ausobskya athos Martens, 1972
- Ausobskya brevipes Thaler, 1996
- Ausobskya hauseri Silhavý, 1976
- Ausobskya mahnerti Silhavý, 1976

- Banksula Roewer, 1949 — California

- Banksula californica (Banks, 1900)
- Banksula galilei Briggs, 1974
- Banksula grahami Briggs, 1974
- Banksula grubbsi Briggs & Ubick, 1981
- Banksula incredula Ubick & Briggs, 2002
- Banksula martinorum Briggs & Ubick, 1981
- Banksula melones Briggs, 1974
- Banksula rudolphi Briggs & Ubick, 1981
- Banksula tuolumne Briggs, 1974
- Banksula tutankhamen Ubick & Briggs, 2002

- Bishopella Roewer, 1927

- Bishopella jonesi Goodnight & Goodnight, 1942 — Alabama
- Bishopella laciniosa (Crosby & Bishop, 1924) — southeastern US

- Calicina Ubick & Briggs, 1989 — California

- Calicina arida Ubick & Briggs, 1989
- Calicina basalta Ubick & Briggs, 1989
- Calicina breva (Briggs, 1968)
- Calicina cloughensis (Briggs & Hom, 1967)
- Calicina conifera Ubick & Briggs, 1989
- Calicina digita (Briggs & Hom, 1967)
- Calicina diminua Ubick & Briggs, 1989
- Calicina dimorphica Ubick & Briggs, 1989
- Calicina ensata (Briggs, 1968)
- Calicina galena Ubick & Briggs, 1989
- Calicina kaweahensis (Briggs & Hom, 1966)
- Calicina keenea (Briggs, 1968)
- Calicina macula (Briggs, 1968)
- Calicina mariposa (Briggs, 1968)
- Calicina mesaensis Ubick & Briggs, 1989
- Calicina minor (Briggs & Hom, 1966)
- Calicina morroensis (Briggs, 1968)
- Calicina palapraeputia (Briggs, 1968)
- Calicina piedra (Briggs, 1968)
- Calicina polina (Briggs, 1968)
- Calicina sequoia (Briggs & Hom, 1966)
- Calicina serpentinea (Briggs & Hom, 1966)
- Calicina sierra (Briggs & Hom, 1967)
- Calicina topanga (Briggs, 1968)
- Calicina yosemitensis (Briggs, 1968)

- Crosbyella Roewer, 1927

- Crosbyella distincta Goodnight & Goodnight, 1942 — USA, Arkansas
- Crosbyella montana Goodnight & Goodnight, 1942 — USA, Alabama
- Crosbyella roeweri Goodnight & Goodnight, 1942 — USA, Arkansas
- Crosbyella spinturnix (Crosby & Bishop, 1924) — USA, southeastern states
- Crosbyella tuberculata Goodnight & Goodnight, 1942 — USA, Alabama

- Glennhuntia Shear, 2001 (misplaced?)

- Glennhuntia glennhunti Shear, 2001 — Australia (Western Australia)

- Guerrobunus Goodnight & Goodnight, 1945 — Mexico (misplaced?)

- Guerrobunus arganoi (Silhavý, 1974)
- Guerrobunus minutus Goodnight & Goodnight, 1945
- Guerrobunus vallensis Vázquez & Cokendolpher, 1997

(For Haasus Roewer, 1949 SEE BELOW)

- Lola Kratochvíl, 1937

- Lola insularis Kratochvíl, 1937 — Croatia

- Maiorerus Rambla, 1993

- Maiorerus randoi Rambla, 1993 — Canary Islands, Spain

- Microcina Briggs & Ubick, 1989 — California

- Microcina edgewoodensis Briggs & Ubick, 1989
- Microcina homi Briggs & Ubick, 1989
- Microcina jungi Briggs & Ubick, 1989
- Microcina leei Briggs & Ubick, 1989
- Microcina lumi Briggs & Ubick, 1989
- Microcina tiburona (Briggs & Hom, 1966)

- Paralola Kratochvíl, Balat & Pelikan, 1958

- Paralola buresi Kratochvíl, Balat & Pelikan, 1958 — Bulgaria

- Phalangodes Tellkampf, 1844

- Phalangodes armata Tellkampf, 1844 — Kentucky
- Phalangodes flavipes (Banks, 1908) — Cuba (misplaced?)

- Phalangomma Roewer, 1949

- Phalangomma virginicum Roewer, 1949 — Virginia

- Proscotolemon Roewer, 1916 — Japan

- Proscotolemon sauteri Roewer, 1916

- Proscotolemon sauteri sauteri Roewer, 1916
- Proscotolemon sauteri lateens Suzuki, 1973

- Ptychosoma Sørensen, 1873

- Ptychosoma catalonicum Kraus, 1961 — Spain
- Ptychosoma vitellinum Sørensen, 1873 — Italy, North Africa

- Scotolemon Lucas, 1860

- Scotolemon balearicus Rambla, 1977 — Balearic Islands, Spain
- Scotolemon claviger (Simon, 1879) — France
- Scotolemon doriae Pavesi, 1878 — France, Croatia, Sicily
- Scotolemon espanoli Rambla, 1973 — Spain
- Scotolemon jaqueti Roewer, 1912 — Hungary, Romania
- Scotolemon krausi Rambla, 1972 — Spain
- Scotolemon lespesi Lucas, 1860 — Portugal, France
- Scotolemon lucasi Simon, 1872 — France
- Scotolemon navaricus Simon, 1879 — Pyrenees
- Scotolemon piochardi Simon, 1892 — Spain
- Scotolemon reclinatus Roewer, 1935 — Spain
- Scotolemon roeweri Kraus, 1961 — Spain
- Scotolemon terricola Simon, 1872 — Corsica, Algeria

- Sitalcina Banks, 1911 — California

- Sitalcina borregoensis Briggs, 1968
- Sitalcina californica (Banks, 1893)
- Sitalcina cockerelli Goodnight & Goodnight, 1942
- Sitalcina flava Briggs, 1968

- Sitalcina flava flava T. S. Briggs, 1968
- Sitalcina flava chalona Briggs, 1968

- Sitalcina granita Briggs, 1968
- Sitalcina lobata Goodnight & Goodnight, 1942
- Sitalcina madera Briggs, 1968
- Sitalcina scopula Briggs, 1968
- Sitalcina sura Briggs, 1968

- Texella Goodnight & Goodnight, 1942

- Texella bifurcata (Briggs, 1968) — California, Oregon
- Texella bilobata Ubick & Briggs, 1992 — Texas
- Texella brevidenta Ubick & Briggs, 1992 — Texas
- Texella brevistyla Ubick & Briggs, 1992 — Texas
- Texella cokendolpheri Ubick & Briggs, 1992 — Texas
- Texella deserticola Ubick & Briggs, 1992 — California
- Texella dimopercula Ubick & Briggs, 2004 — Texas
- Texella diplospina Ubick & Briggs, 1992 — Texas
- Texella elliotti Ubick & Briggs, 2004 — Texas
- Texella fendi Ubick & Briggs, 1992 — Texas
- Texella grubbsi Ubick & Briggs, 1992 — Texas
- Texella hardeni Ubick & Briggs, 1992 — Texas
- Texella hartae Ubick & Briggs, 2004 — Texas
- Texella hilgerensis Ubick & Briggs, 2004 — Texas
- Texella homi Ubick & Briggs, 1992 — Texas
- Texella jungi Ubick & Briggs, 1992 — Texas
- Texella kokoweef Ubick & Briggs, 1992 — California
- Texella longistyla Ubick & Briggs, 1992 — Texas,
- Texella mulaiki Goodnight & Goodnight, 1942 — Texas
- Texella reddelli Goodnight & Goodnight, 1967 — Texas
- Texella renkesae Ubick & Briggs, 1992 — Texas
- Texella reyesi Ubick & Briggs, 1992 — Texas
- Texella shoshone Ubick & Briggs, 1992 — California
- Texella spinoperca Ubick & Briggs, 1992 — Texas
- Texella tuberculata Ubick & Briggs, 2004 — Texas
- Texella welbourni Ubick & Briggs, 1992 — New Mexico
- Texella whitei Ubick & Briggs, 2004 — Texas
- Texella youngensis Ubick & Briggs, 2004 — Texas

- Tolus Goodnight & Goodnight, 1942

- Tolus appalachius Goodnight & Goodnight, 1942 — Tennessee

- Undulus Goodnight & Goodnight, 1942

- Undulus formosus Goodnight & Goodnight, 1942 — USA, Alabama

- Wespus Goodnight & Goodnight, 1942

- Wespus arkansasensis Goodnight & Goodnight, 1942 — USA, Arkansas

Else, former species subsequently transferred elsewhere:

- Haasus Roewer, 1949 (= family Pyramidopidae)

- Haasus judaeus Roewer, 1949 — Israel
- Haasus naasane Aharon et al., 2019 — West Bank. (after Hallan catalog)
