= Krusa (disambiguation) =

Krusa may refer to:

- Kruså, Danish town
- Krusa, a genus of arachnids

== See also ==
- Velika Kruša
