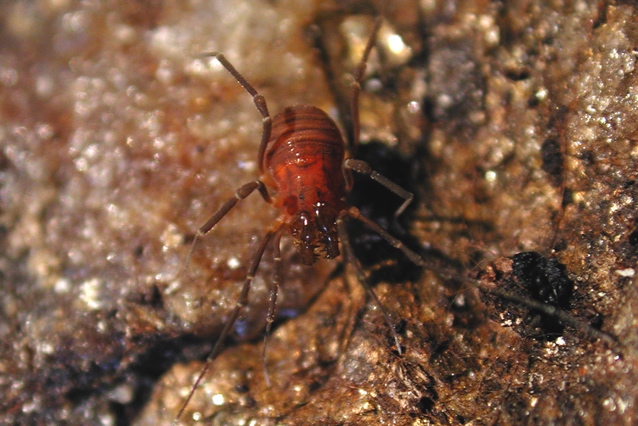
- Bishopella laciniosa (Phalangodidae)

Scientific classification
- Kingdom: Animalia
- Phylum: Arthropoda
- Subphylum: Chelicerata
- Class: Arachnida
- Order: Opiliones
- Infraorder: Grassatores
- Superfamily: Phalangodoidea

Families
- See text for list.

= Phalangodoidea =

Superfamily of harvestmen/daddy longlegs

The Phalangodoidea are a superfamily of the harvestman arachnids in infraorder Grassatores with three recognized families and 220 species. It is not to be confused with the similarly spelled subfamily Phalangioidea, which is also a harvestman superfamily, but within the suborder Eupnoi.

== Families ==
- Oncopodidae Thorell, 1876 (about 70 species)
- Phalangodidae Simon, 1879 (about 100 species)
- Pyramidopidae Starega (about 50 species)
