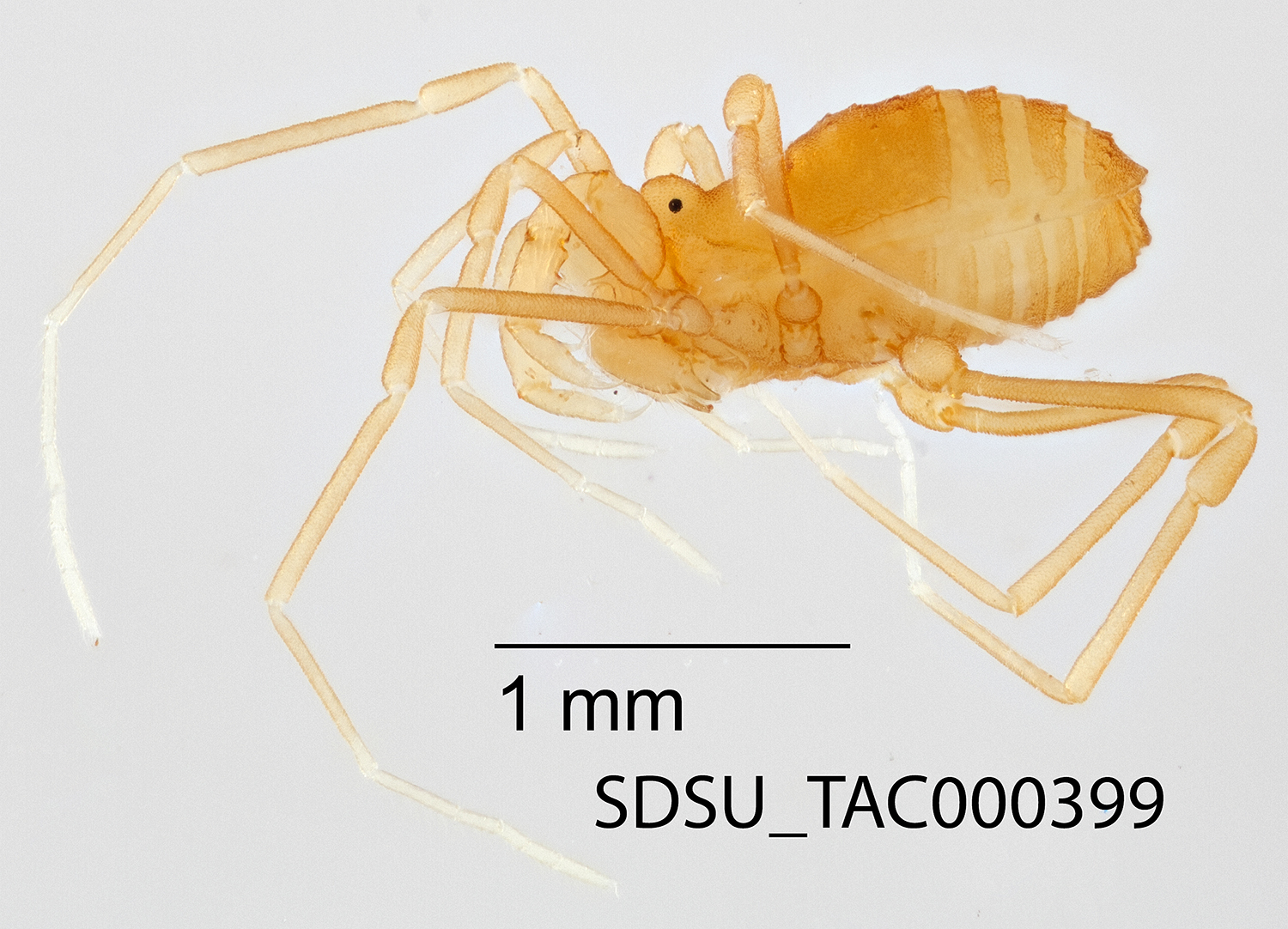

Scientific classification
- Kingdom: Animalia
- Phylum: Arthropoda
- Subphylum: Chelicerata
- Class: Arachnida
- Order: Opiliones
- Family: Phalangodidae
- Genus: Megacina
- Species: M. schusteri

Binomial name
- Megacina schusteri Ubick & Briggs, 2008

= Megacina schusteri =

Species of harvestman/daddy longlegs

Megacina schusteri is a species of armoured harvestman in the family Phalangodidae. It is found in North America.
