= Sitalcina peacheyi =

Scientific classification
- Kingdom: Animalia
- Phylum: Arthropoda
- Subphylum: Chelicerata
- Class: Arachnida
- Order: Opiliones
- Family: Phalangodidae
- Genus: Sitalcina
- Species: S. peacheyi

Binomial name
- Sitalcina peacheyi Ubick & Briggs, 2008

Species of harvestman/daddy longlegs

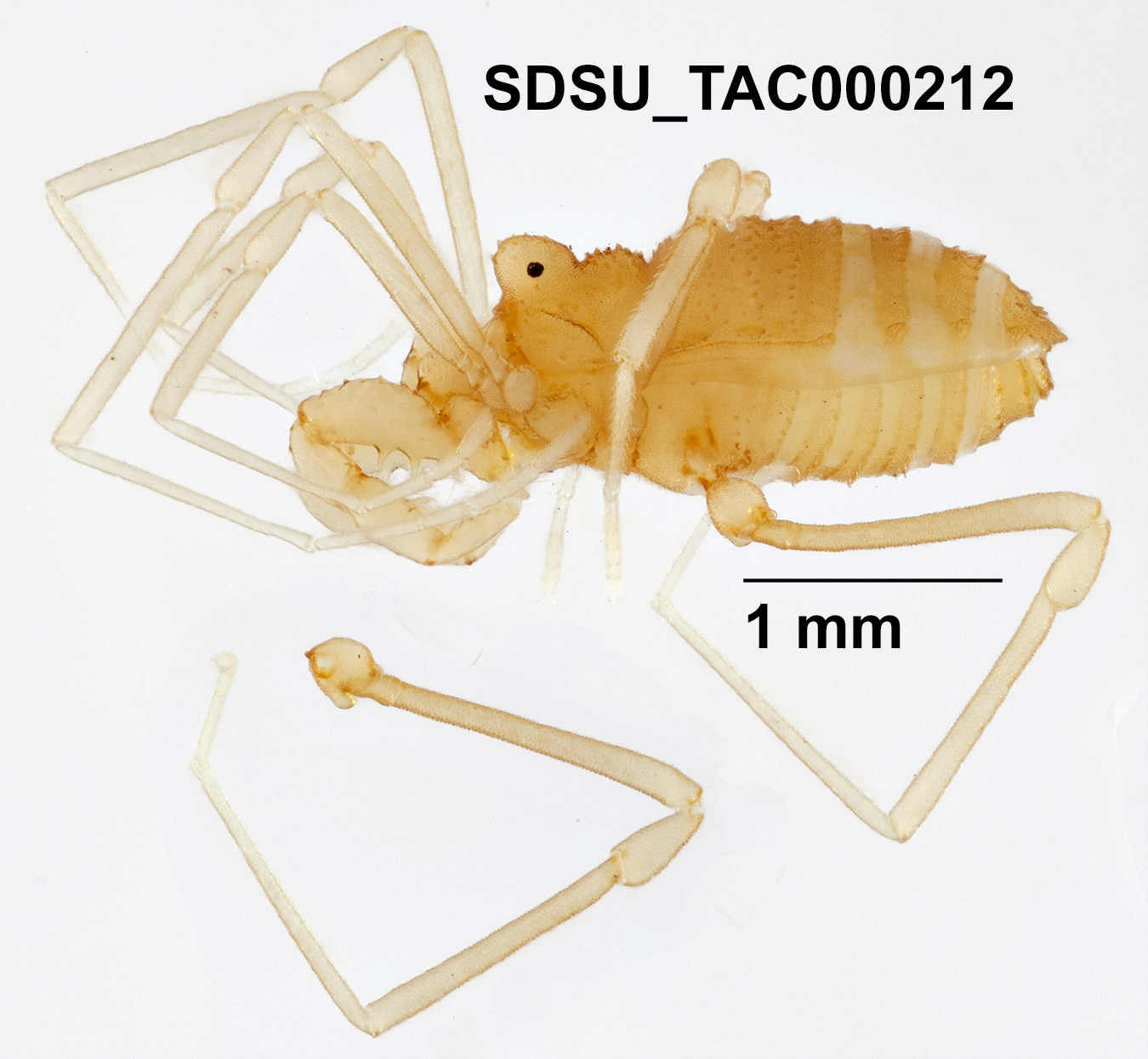
Sitalcina peacheyi Ubick & Briggs, 2008 (SDSU TAC000212)

Sitalcina peacheyi is a species of armoured harvestman in the family Phalangodidae. It is found in North America.
