= Sitalcina rothi =

Scientific classification
- Kingdom: Animalia
- Phylum: Arthropoda
- Subphylum: Chelicerata
- Class: Arachnida
- Order: Opiliones
- Family: Phalangodidae
- Genus: Sitalcina
- Species: S. rothi

Binomial name
- Sitalcina rothi Ubick & Briggs, 2008

Species of harvestman/daddy longlegs

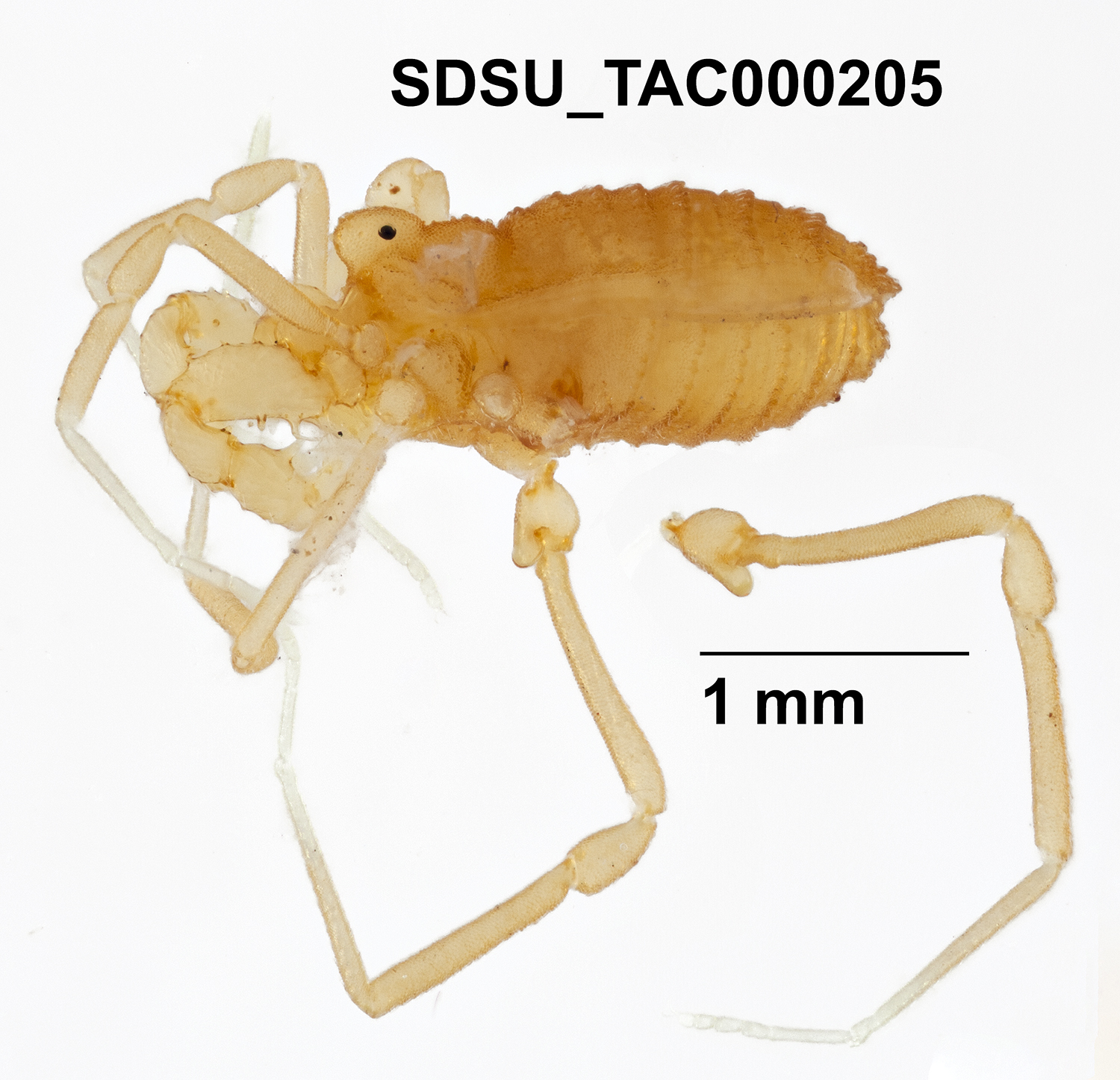
Sitalcina rothi Ubick & Briggs, 2008 (SDSU TAC000205)

Sitalcina rothi is a species of armoured harvestman in the family Phalangodidae. It is found in North America.
