= Sitalcina catalina =

Scientific classification
- Domain: Eukaryota
- Kingdom: Animalia
- Phylum: Arthropoda
- Subphylum: Chelicerata
- Class: Arachnida
- Order: Opiliones
- Family: Phalangodidae
- Genus: Sitalcina
- Species: S. catalina

Binomial name
- Sitalcina catalina Ubick and Briggs, 2008

Species of harvestman

Sitalcina catalina is a species of armoured harvestman in the family Phalangodidae.
