= Enigmina granita =

Scientific classification
- Kingdom: Animalia
- Phylum: Arthropoda
- Subphylum: Chelicerata
- Class: Arachnida
- Order: Opiliones
- Family: Phalangodidae
- Genus: Enigmina
- Species: E. granita

Binomial name
- Enigmina granita (Briggs, 1968)

Synonyms
- Sitalcina granita Briggs, 1968

Species of harvestman/daddy longlegs

Enigmina granita is a species of armoured harvestman in the family Phalangodidae. It is found in North America.
