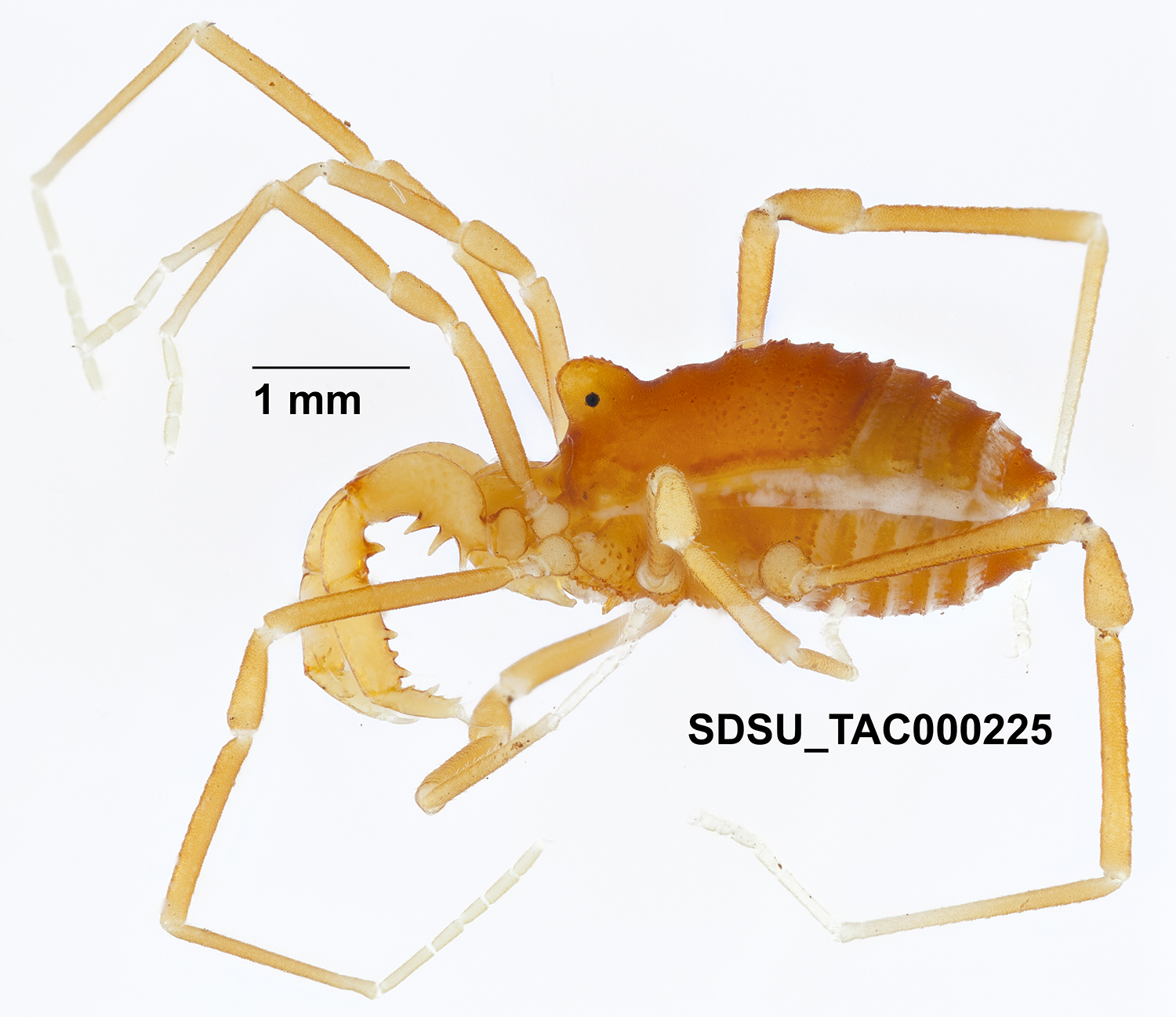

Scientific classification
- Kingdom: Animalia
- Phylum: Arthropoda
- Subphylum: Chelicerata
- Class: Arachnida
- Order: Opiliones
- Family: Phalangodidae
- Genus: Megacina
- Species: M. cockerelli

Binomial name
- Megacina cockerelli (C.J. Goodnight & M.L. Goodnight, 1942)

Synonyms
- Sitalcina cockerelli C.J. Goodnight and M.L. Goodnight, 1942

= Megacina cockerelli =

Species of harvestman/daddy longlegs

Megacina cockerelli is a species of armoured harvestman in the family Phalangodidae. It is found in North America.
