= Enigmina warrenorum =

Scientific classification
- Kingdom: Animalia
- Phylum: Arthropoda
- Subphylum: Chelicerata
- Class: Arachnida
- Order: Opiliones
- Family: Phalangodidae
- Genus: Enigmina
- Species: E. warrenorum

Binomial name
- Enigmina warrenorum Ubick & Briggs, 2008

Species of harvestman/daddy longlegs

Enigmina warrenorum is a species of armoured harvestman in the family Phalangodidae. It is found in North America.
