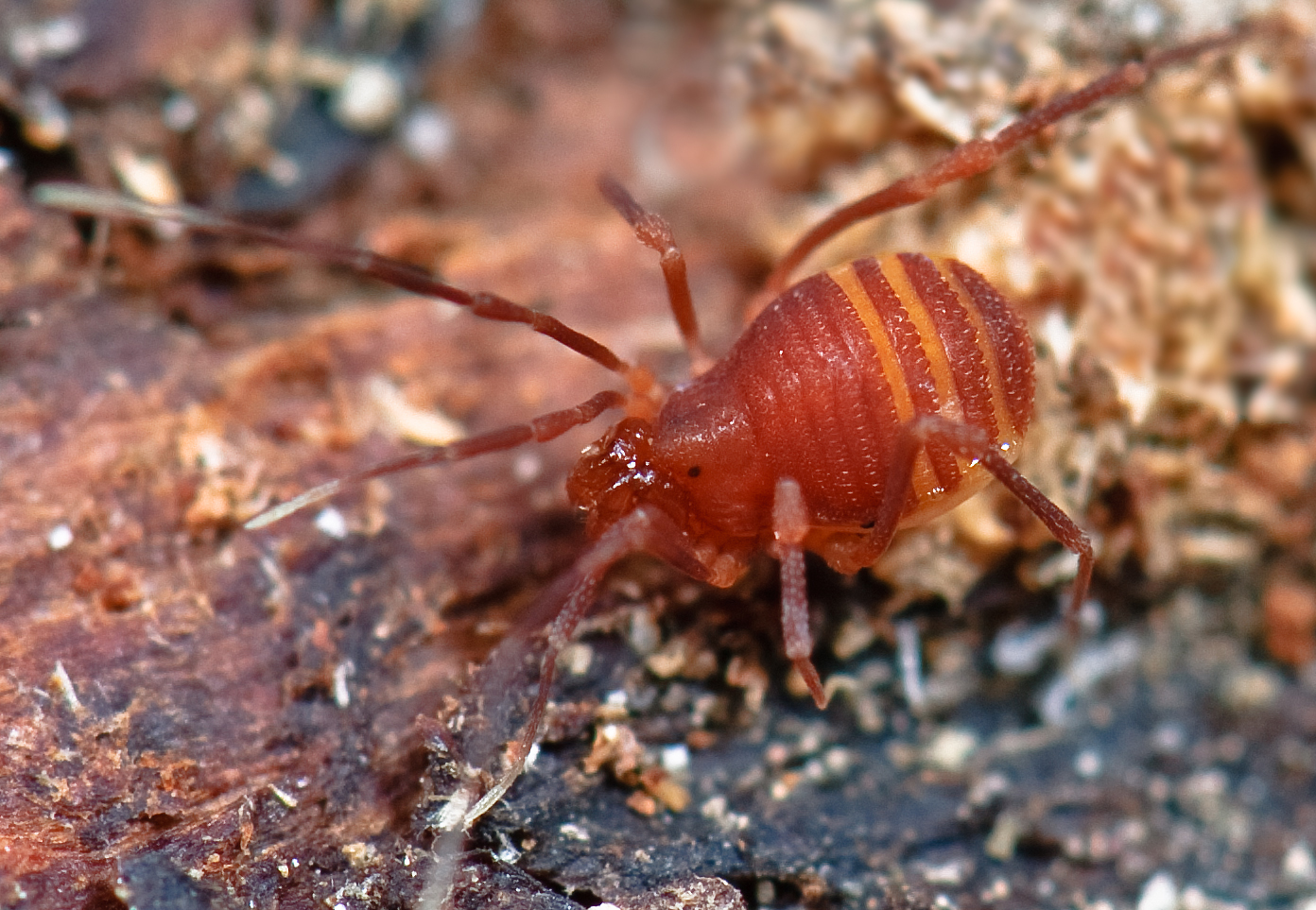

Scientific classification
- Kingdom: Animalia
- Phylum: Arthropoda
- Subphylum: Chelicerata
- Class: Arachnida
- Order: Opiliones
- Family: Phalangodidae
- Genus: Sitalcina
- Species: S. sura

Binomial name
- Sitalcina sura Briggs, 1968

= Sitalcina sura =

Species of harvestman/daddy longlegs

Sitalcina sura is a species of armoured harvestman in the family Phalangodidae. It is found in North America.
