= Wespus =

Scientific classification
- Kingdom: Animalia
- Phylum: Arthropoda
- Subphylum: Chelicerata
- Class: Arachnida
- Order: Opiliones
- Family: Phalangodidae
- Genus: Wespus; C.J. Goodnight & M.L. Goodnight, 1942
- Species: W. arkansasensis

Binomial name
- Wespus arkansasensis C.J. Goodnight & M.L. Goodnight, 1942

Genus of harvestmen/daddy longlegs

Wespus is a genus of armoured harvestmen in the family Phalangodidae. There is one described species, Wespus arkansasensis. It was described from Hot Springs, Arkansas (United States).

The body length is 2.2 mm (0.087 in).
