= Banksula californica =

Conservation status
- Possibly Extinct (NatureServe)

Scientific classification
- Kingdom: Animalia
- Phylum: Arthropoda
- Subphylum: Chelicerata
- Class: Arachnida
- Order: Opiliones
- Family: Phalangodidae
- Genus: Banksula
- Species: B. californica

Binomial name
- Banksula californica Banks, 1900

Species of harvestman/daddy longlegs

Banksula californica is a species of harvestman in family Phalangodidae. The animal is less than 2 mm (0.079 in) in length.

== Possible extinction ==
The species is possibly extinct because the type locality, the place from where the type specimen of the species was collected, Alabaster Cave in El Dorado County, California, has been partially destroyed due to mining and has been sealed by concrete, making surveying impossible.
