= Sitalcina flava =

Scientific classification
- Domain: Eukaryota
- Kingdom: Animalia
- Phylum: Arthropoda
- Subphylum: Chelicerata
- Class: Arachnida
- Order: Opiliones
- Family: Phalangodidae
- Genus: Sitalcina
- Species: S. flava

Binomial name
- Sitalcina flava Briggs, 1968

Species of harvestman

Sitalcina flava is a species of armoured harvestman in the family Phalangodidae.
