= Krusa (harvestman) =

Scientific classification
- Domain: Eukaryota
- Kingdom: Animalia
- Phylum: Arthropoda
- Subphylum: Chelicerata
- Class: Arachnida
- Order: Opiliones
- Family: Sclerosomatidae
- Genus: Krusa; C.J.Goodnight & M.L.Goodnight, 1947

Genus of harvestmen/daddy longlegs

Krusa is a genus of harvestmen in the family Sclerosomatidae from Mexico.

== Species ==
- Krusa amazonica Roewer, 1953
- Krusa annulata C.J.Goodnight & M.L.Goodnight, 1945
- Krusa boliviana Roewer, 1953
- Krusa flava C.J.Goodnight & M.L.Goodnight, 1946
- Krusa metallica C.J.Goodnight & M.L.Goodnight, 1946
- Krusa mexicana C.J.Goodnight & M.L.Goodnight, 1947
- Krusa peruviana Roewer, 1953
- Krusa pilipes (Roewer, 1953)
- Krusa stellata C.J.Goodnight & M.L.Goodnight, 1946
- Krusa tuberculata C.J.Goodnight & M.L.Goodnight, 1946
