= Calicina sequoia =

Scientific classification
- Kingdom: Animalia
- Phylum: Arthropoda
- Subphylum: Chelicerata
- Class: Arachnida
- Order: Opiliones
- Family: Phalangodidae
- Genus: Calicina
- Species: C. sequoia

Binomial name
- Calicina sequoia (Briggs & Hom, 1966)

Species of harvestman/daddy longlegs

Calicina sequoia is a species of armoured harvestman in the family Phalangodidae. It is found in North America.
