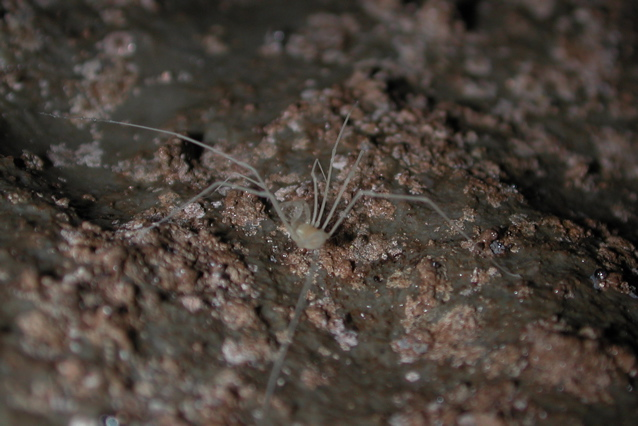
- T. appalachius

Scientific classification
- Kingdom: Animalia
- Phylum: Arthropoda
- Subphylum: Chelicerata
- Class: Arachnida
- Order: Opiliones
- Family: Phalangodidae
- Genus: Tolus; C.J. Goodnight & M.L. Goodnight, 1942
- Species: T. appalachius

Binomial name
- Tolus appalachius C.J. Goodnight & M.L. Goodnight, 1942

= Tolus =

Genus of harvestmen/daddy longlegs

Tolus is a genus of harvestman in family Phalangodidae. The sole species Tolus appalachius, which was described based on specimens from two caves in Tennessee (United States).

The body length is 2.7 mm (0.11 in).
