= Metapellobunus =

Scientific classification
- Domain: Eukaryota
- Kingdom: Animalia
- Phylum: Arthropoda
- Subphylum: Chelicerata
- Class: Arachnida
- Order: Opiliones
- Infraorder: Grassatores
- Genus: Metapellobunus; Roewer, 1923

Type species
- Pellobunus unicolor Roewer, 1912

Diversity
- 3 spp. (see text)

Genus of harvestmen/daddy longlegs

Metapellobunus is a genus of harvestmen in the Grassatores with three described species (as of January 2025). Two species are found in the Lesser Antilles, and one in Ecuador. An overview of the taxonomy was provided by Pérez-González et al. (2025).

== Description ==
The genus Metapellobunus was described by Roewer, 1923 with the type species Pellobunus unicolor Roewer, 1912.

== Species ==
These species belong to the genus Metapellobunus:

- Metapellobunus lapidosus Roewer, 1928 – Ecuador
- Metapellobunus lutzi (Goodnight & Goodnight 1942) – Dominica
- Metapellobunus unicolor Roewer, 1912 – US Virgin Islands (St. Thomas.)

== Etymology ==
The genus is masculine.
