= Crosbyella spinturnix =

Scientific classification
- Kingdom: Animalia
- Phylum: Arthropoda
- Subphylum: Chelicerata
- Class: Arachnida
- Order: Opiliones
- Family: Phalangodidae
- Genus: Crosbyella
- Species: C. spinturnix

Binomial name
- Crosbyella spinturnix (Crosby & Bishop, 1924)

Synonyms
- Phalangodes spinturnix Crosby & Bishop, 1924

Species of harvestman/daddy longlegs

Crosbyella spinturnix is a species in the suborder Laniatores ("armoured harvestmen"), in the order Opiliones ("harvestmen"). It is found in North America.
