= Banksula melones =

Banksia melones

Conservation status
- Vulnerable (IUCN 2.3)

- Critically Imperiled (NatureServe)

Scientific classification
- Kingdom: Animalia
- Phylum: Arthropoda
- Subphylum: Chelicerata
- Class: Arachnida
- Order: Opiliones
- Family: Phalangodidae
- Genus: Banksula
- Species: B. melones

Binomial name
- Banksula melones Briggs, 1974

Species of harvestman/daddy longlegs

Banksula melones is a species of harvestman in family Phalangodidae. It is endemic to caves along the Stanislaus River of California, United States.

This, with a body size of only slightly more than 2 mm, minute harvestman lives only in caves. Its body is colored yellowish-orange, with white to yellowish white appendages. It appears in the same caves as Banksula grahami, which is slightly smaller and has no well-developed eyes. In fact, B. melones has the best eyes in the whole genus, except for B. incredula, which is the only species that does not inhabit caves. B. melones has been occasionally found near cave openings.

When disturbed, they tend to remain motionless for up to several minutes. They can probably live for several years, which is quite long for a harvestman, with molts occurring only every several months. They have been shown to survive without food for up to 43 days (Rudolph, 1979). They prey on very small arthropods, preferring springtails over booklice.

== Conservation ==
In the late 1970s, the caves of the region were threatened by the construction of the New Melones Dam. B. melones, B. grahami and about 30 other cave-dwelling species were therefore transplanted from McLean's Cave to an abandoned mine shaft, where the Banksula species reproduced well at first. However, ten years later, no B. grahami was found, while more than 50 individuals of B. melones were counted. Again ten years later, in 1996, only six individuals were left. However, the species was since found in a number of nearby caves.
