= Crosbyella tuberculata =

Scientific classification
- Kingdom: Animalia
- Phylum: Arthropoda
- Subphylum: Chelicerata
- Class: Arachnida
- Order: Opiliones
- Family: Phalangodidae
- Genus: Crosbyella
- Species: C. tuberculata

Binomial name
- Crosbyella tuberculata C.J. Goodnight & M.L. Goodnight, 1942

Species of harvestman/daddy longlegs

Crosbyella tuberculata is a species of armoured harvestman in the family Phalangodidae. It is found in North America.
