= Sitalcina californica =

Scientific classification
- Kingdom: Animalia
- Phylum: Arthropoda
- Subphylum: Chelicerata
- Class: Arachnida
- Order: Opiliones
- Family: Phalangodidae
- Genus: Sitalcina
- Species: S. californica

Binomial name
- Sitalcina californica (Banks, 1893)

Species of harvestman/daddy longlegs

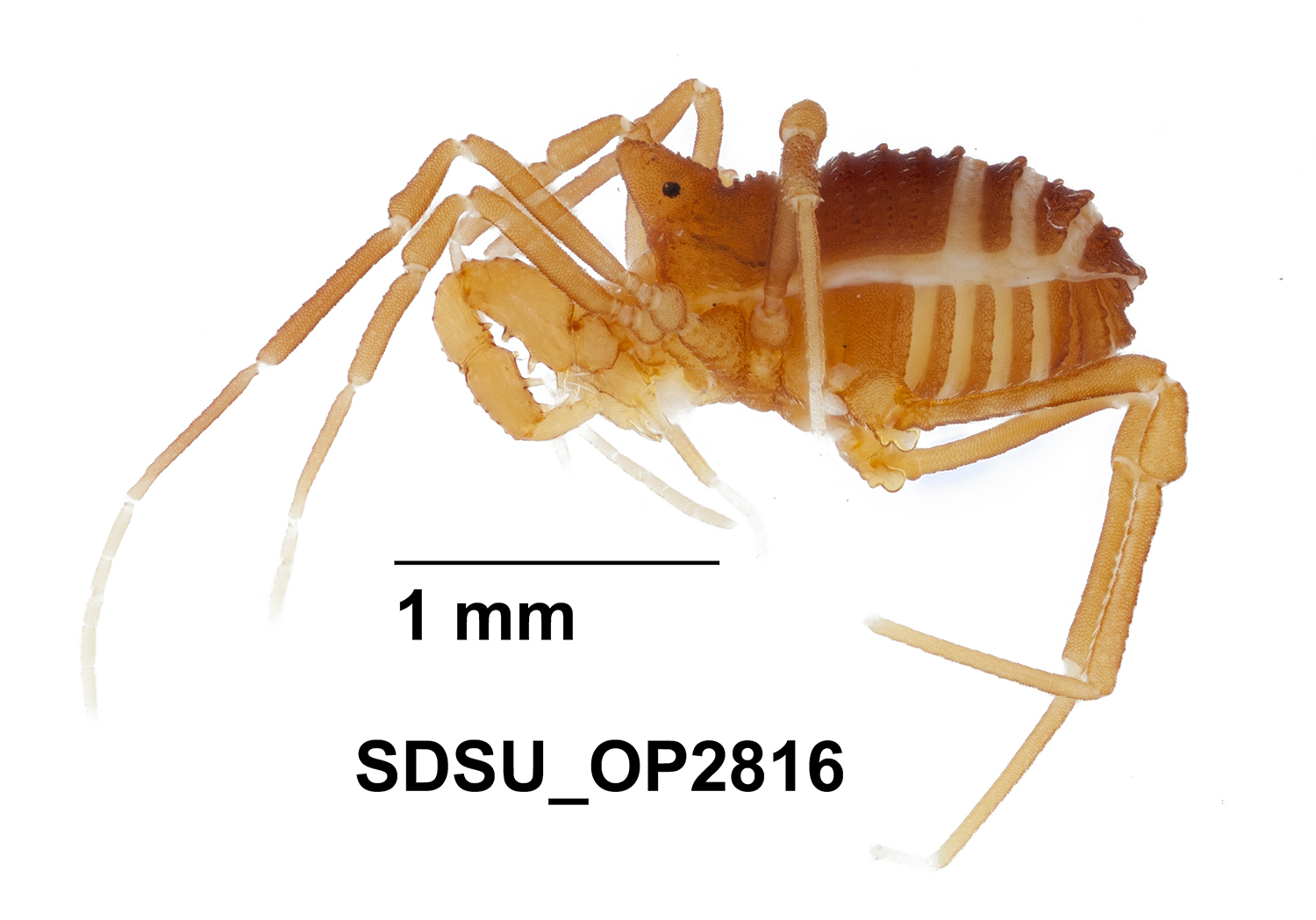
Sitalcina californica (Banks, 1893) (SDSU OP2816)

Sitalcina californica is a species of armoured harvestman in the family Phalangodidae. It is found in North America.
