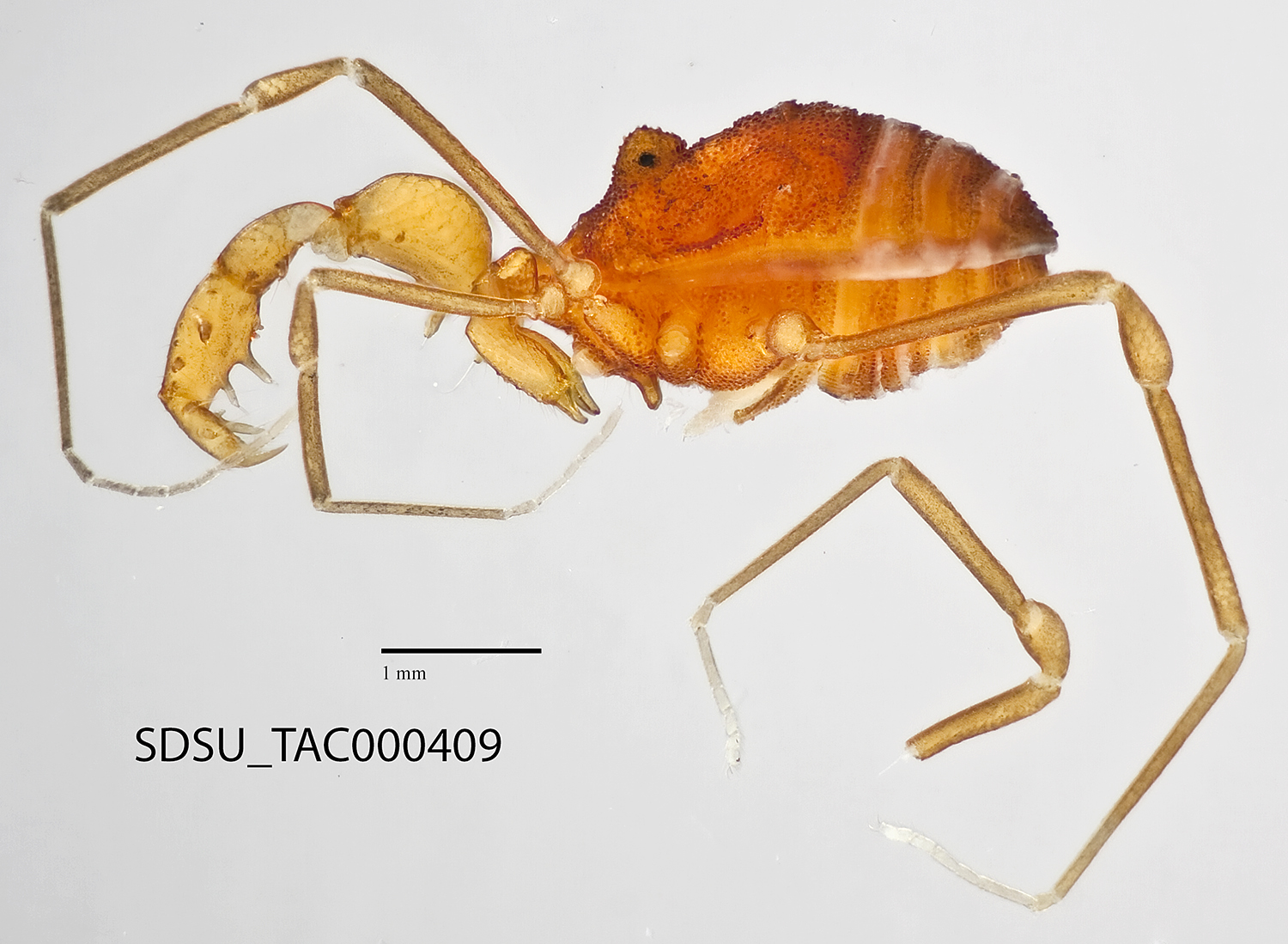
- Undulus formosus

Scientific classification
- Kingdom: Animalia
- Phylum: Arthropoda
- Subphylum: Chelicerata
- Class: Arachnida
- Order: Opiliones
- Family: Phalangodidae
- Genus: Undulus; C.J. Goodnight & M.L. Goodnight, 1942
- Species: U. formosus

Binomial name
- Undulus formosus C.J. Goodnight & M.L. Goodnight, 1942

= Undulus =

Genus of harvestmen/daddy longlegs

Undulus is a genus of armoured harvestmen in the family Phalangodidae. There is one described species, Undulus formosus. It was described from Limestone County, Alabama (United States).

The body length is 1.9 mm (0.075 in).
