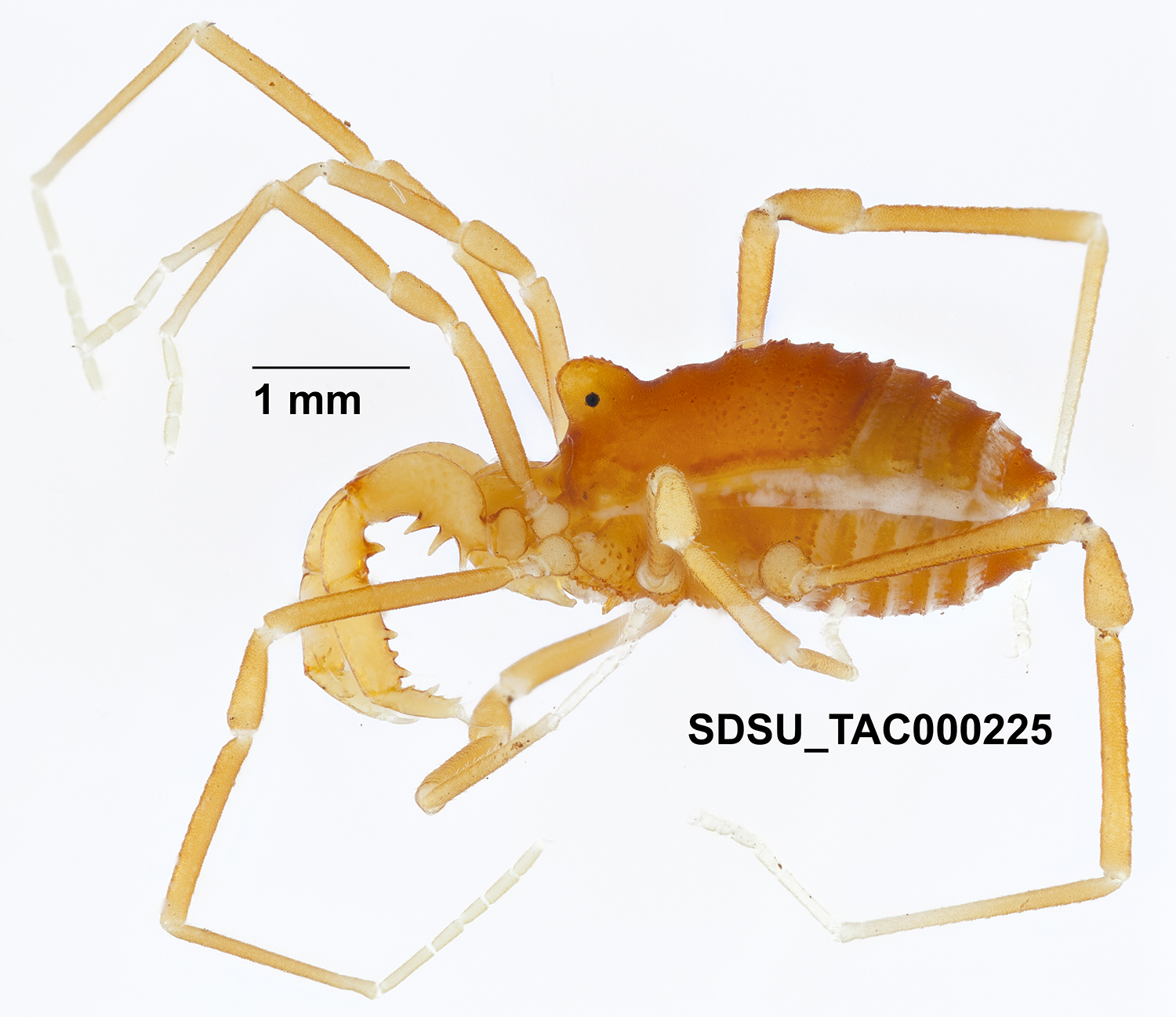
- Megacina cockerelli

Scientific classification
- Kingdom: Animalia
- Phylum: Arthropoda
- Subphylum: Chelicerata
- Class: Arachnida
- Order: Opiliones
- Family: Phalangodidae
- Genus: Megacina; Ubick & Briggs, 2008

= Megacina =

Genus of harvestmen/daddy longlegs

Megacina is a genus of armoured harvestmen in the family Phalangodidae. There are at least four described species in Megacina.

== Species ==
These four species belong to the genus Megacina:

- Megacina cockerelli (C.J. Goodnight & M.L. Goodnight, 1942)
- Megacina madera (Briggs, 1968)
- Megacina mayacma Ubick & Briggs, 2008
- Megacina schusteri Ubick & Briggs, 2008
