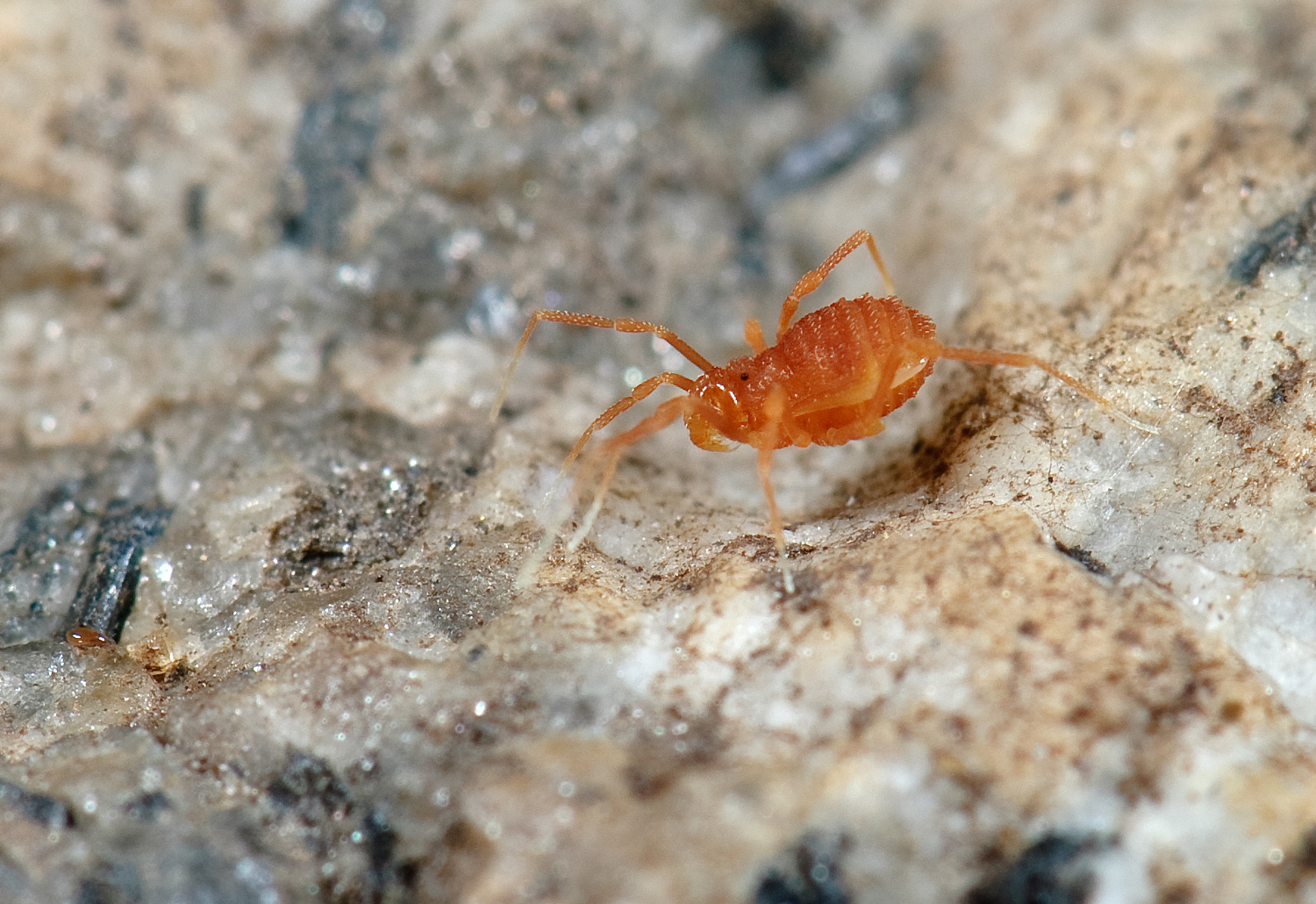

Scientific classification
- Kingdom: Animalia
- Phylum: Arthropoda
- Subphylum: Chelicerata
- Class: Arachnida
- Order: Opiliones
- Family: Phalangodidae
- Genus: Sitalcina
- Species: S. lobata

Binomial name
- Sitalcina lobata C.J. Goodnight & M.L. Goodnight, 1942

= Sitalcina lobata =

Species of harvestman/daddy longlegs

Sitalcina lobata is a species of armoured harvestman in the family Phalangodidae. It is found in North America.
