= Sitalcina borregoensis =

Scientific classification
- Domain: Eukaryota
- Kingdom: Animalia
- Phylum: Arthropoda
- Subphylum: Chelicerata
- Class: Arachnida
- Order: Opiliones
- Family: Phalangodidae
- Genus: Sitalcina
- Species: S. borregoensis

Binomial name
- Sitalcina borregoensis Briggs, 1968

Species of harvestman/daddy longlegs

Sitalcina borregoensis is a species of armoured harvestman in the family Phalangodidae. It is found in North America.
