= Enigmina =

Scientific classification
- Kingdom: Animalia
- Phylum: Arthropoda
- Subphylum: Chelicerata
- Class: Arachnida
- Order: Opiliones
- Family: Phalangodidae
- Genus: Enigmina; Ubick & Briggs, 2008

Genus of harvestmen/daddy longlegs

Enigmina is a genus of armoured harvestmen in the family Phalangodidae. There are at least two described species in Enigmina.

== Species ==
These two species belong to the genus Enigmina:

- Enigmina granita (Briggs, 1968)
- Enigmina warrenorum Ubick & Briggs, 2008
