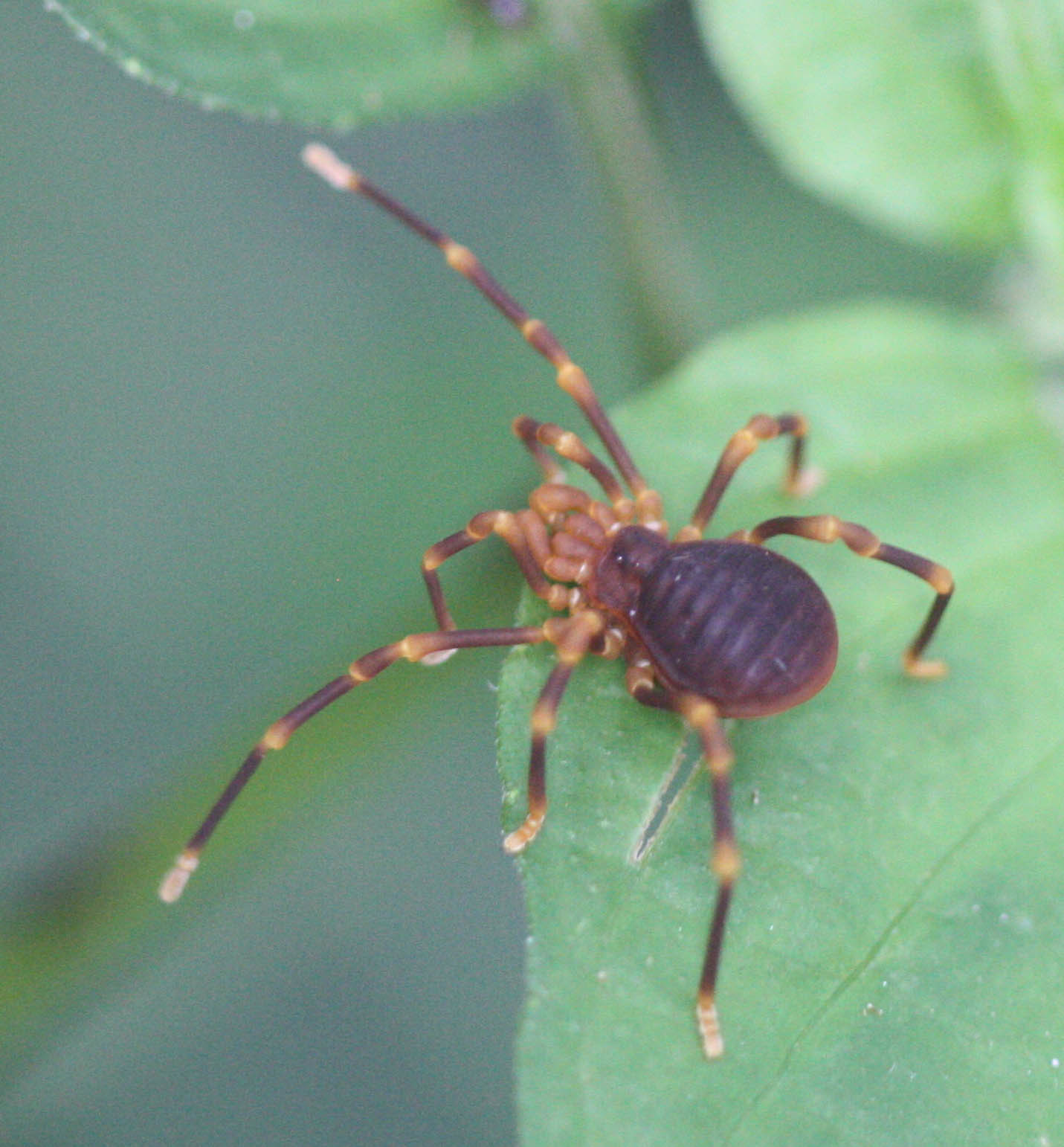
- Gnomulus sp.

Scientific classification
- Kingdom: Animalia
- Phylum: Arthropoda
- Subphylum: Chelicerata
- Class: Arachnida
- Order: Opiliones
- Superfamily: Phalangodoidea
- Family: Sandokanidae; Özdikmen & Kury, 2007

Genera
- See text for list.

Diversity
- 5 genera, > 60 species

= Sandokanidae =

Family of harvestmen

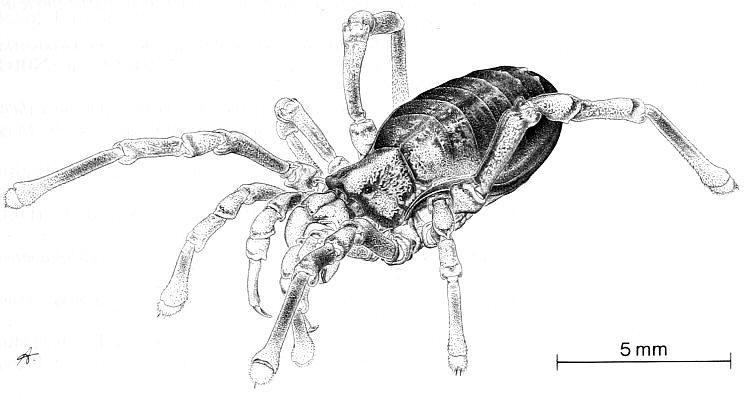
Drawing of female Oncopus truncatus Thorrell

Sandokanidae is a family of harvestmen in the suborder Laniatores, formerly referred to as Oncopodidae (the name was replaced because of the secondary homonymy of the type genus Oncopus, replaced by Sandokan; this made the change of family name mandatory)

== Name ==
The name of the type genus is based on the name of a fictional Bornean prince-pirate.

== Description ==
Sandokanidae range in body size from about 2–11 mm. Their legs are relatively short and stout. Most species are amber colored with some dark brown patterns. A few undescribed Gnomulus species are orange.

== Distribution ==
This family is known from Southeast Asia from Indonesia, almost reaching New Guinea on Waigeo, up north into the Himalayan region.

== Relationships ==
Sandokanidae are probably the sister group to all other Grassatores.

== Species ==
- Biantoncopus Martens & Schwendinger, 1998

- Biantoncopus fuscus Martens & Schwendinger, 1998 — Leyte (Philippines)

- Caenoncopus Martens & Schwendinger, 1998 — Sumatra

- Caenoncopus affinis Martens & Schwendinger, 1998
- Caenoncopus cuspidatus (Schwendinger, 1992)
- Caenoncopus tenuis Martens & Schwendinger, 1998

- Gnomulus Thorell, 1890

- Gnomulus aborensis (Roewer, 1913) — Arunachal Pradesh (northeast India)
- Gnomulus annulipes (Pocock, 1897) — Sarawak (Borneo)
- Gnomulus armillatus (Thorell, 1891) — Sumatra
- Gnomulus asli Martens & Schwendinger, 1998 — West Malaysia
- Gnomulus baharu Schwendinger, in Martens & Schwendinger 1998
- Gnomulus carinatus Schwendinger & Martens, 2002 — Kalimantan (Indonesia)
- Gnomulus claviger Schwendinger & Martens, 2002 — Luzon (Philippines)
- Gnomulus coniceps Martens & Schwendinger, 1998 — Luzon
- Gnomulus conigerus (Schwendinger, 1992) — Sabah (Malaysia)
- Gnomulus crassipes Schwendinger & Martens, 2002 — Luzon
- Gnomulus crucifer Martens & Schwendinger, 1998 — Luzon
- Gnomulus drescoi (Silhavy, 1962) — Sumatra
- Gnomulus exsudans Schwendinger & Martens, 2002 — Sabah
- Gnomulus goodnighti (Suzuki, 1977) — Mindanao (Philippines)
- Gnomulus hamatus Schwendinger & Martens, 2002 — Luzon
- Gnomulus hirsutus Martens & Schwendinger, 1998 — West Malaysia
- Gnomulus hutan Schwendinger & Martens, 2002 — Sarawak
- Gnomulus hyatti (Martens, 1977) — Nepal
- Gnomulus imadatei (Suzuki, 1970) — Brunei
- Gnomulus insularis (Roewer, 1927) — Penang? (Malaysia)
- Gnomulus javanicus Schwendinger & Martens, 2002 — Java
- Gnomulus laevis (Roewer, 1915) — Borneo
- Gnomulus lannaianus (Schwendinger, 1992) — Thailand
- Gnomulus laruticus Martens & Schwendinger, 1998 — West Malaysia
- Gnomulus latoperculum Schwendinger & Martens, 2002 — Sulawesi
- Gnomulus leofeae Schwendinger & Martens, 2002 — Burma
- Gnomulus leyteensis Martens & Schwendinger, 1998 — Leyte
- Gnomulus lomani Schwendinger & Martens, 2002 — Borneo, Sumatra?
- Gnomulus maculatus Martens & Schwendinger, 1998 — Luzon
- Gnomulus marginatus Schwendinger & Martens, 2002 — Thailand
- Gnomulus matabesar Schwendinger & Martens, 2002 — Halmahera (Indonesia)
- Gnomulus minor N. Tsurusaki, 1990 — Philippines
- Gnomulus monticola Schwendinger & Martens, 2002 — West Malaysia
- Gnomulus obscurus Schwendinger & Martens, 2002 — Sarawak
- Gnomulus palawanensis (S. Suzuki, 1982) — Palawan (Philippines)
- Gnomulus piliger (Pocock, 1903) — Thailand
- Gnomulus pilosus Schwendinger & Martens, 2002 — West Malaysia
- Gnomulus pulvillatus (Pocock, 1903) — West Malaysia
- Gnomulus rostratoideus Schwendinger & Martens, 2002 — West Malaysia, Singapore
- Gnomulus rostratus Thorell, 1890 — Penang
- Gnomulus ryssie Schwendinger & Martens, 2002 — Thailand
- Gnomulus sinensis Schwendinger & Martens, 2002 — Sichuan (China)
- Gnomulus spiniceps Schwendinger & Martens, 2002 — Vietnam
- Gnomulus sumatranus Thorell, 1891 — Sumatra
- Gnomulus sundaicus (Schwendinger, 1992) — Sarawak
- Gnomulus thorelli (Sørensen, 1932) — Java
- Gnomulus tuberculatus Schwendinger & Martens, 2002 — Sumatra
- Gnomulus tumidifrons Schwendinger & Martens, 2002 — Halmahera

- Sandokan Özdikmen & Kury, 2007

- Sandokan doriae Thorell, 1876 — Sarawak
- Sandokan expatriatus (Schwendinger & Martens, 2004) — Thailand?
- Sandokan feae Thorell, 1890 — Penang
- Sandokan hosei Pocock, 1897 — Sarawak
- Sandokan lingga (Schwendinger & Martens, 2004) — Lingga Islands (Indonesia)
- Sandokan malayanus (Schwendinger & Martens, 2004) — West Malaysia
- Sandokan megachelis (Schwendinger, 1992) — Sabah
- Sandokan tiomanensis (Schwendinger & Martens, 2004) — Tioman Island (Malaysia)
- Sandokan truncatus Thorell, 1891 — Singapore

- Palaeoncopus Martens & Schwendinger, 1998 — Sumatra

- Palaeoncopus gunung Martens & Schwendinger, 1998
- Palaeoncopus katik Martens & Schwendinger, 1998
- Palaeoncopus kerdil Martens & Schwendinger, 1998
