= Banksula =

Scientific classification
- Domain: Eukaryota
- Kingdom: Animalia
- Phylum: Arthropoda
- Subphylum: Chelicerata
- Class: Arachnida
- Order: Opiliones
- Family: Phalangodidae
- Genus: Banksula; Roewer, 1949

Type species
- Scotolemon californica Banks, 1900

Species
- See text

Diversity
- 10 species

Genus of harvestmen/daddy longlegs

Banksula is a genus of harvestman in family Phalangodidae. Currently, ten species are described, all of them endemic to California, United States.

The genus is named in honor of Nathan Banks, who described the type species.

== Species ==
- Banksula californica (Banks, 1900)
- Banksula galilei Briggs, 1974
- Banksula grahami Briggs, 1974
- Banksula grubbsi Briggs & Ubick, 1981
- Banksula incredula Ubick & Briggs, 2002
- Banksula martinorum Briggs & Ubick, 1981
- Banksula melones Briggs, 1974
- Banksula rudolphi Briggs & Ubick, 1981
- Banksula tuolumne Briggs, 1974
- Banksula tutankhamen Ubick & Briggs, 2002
