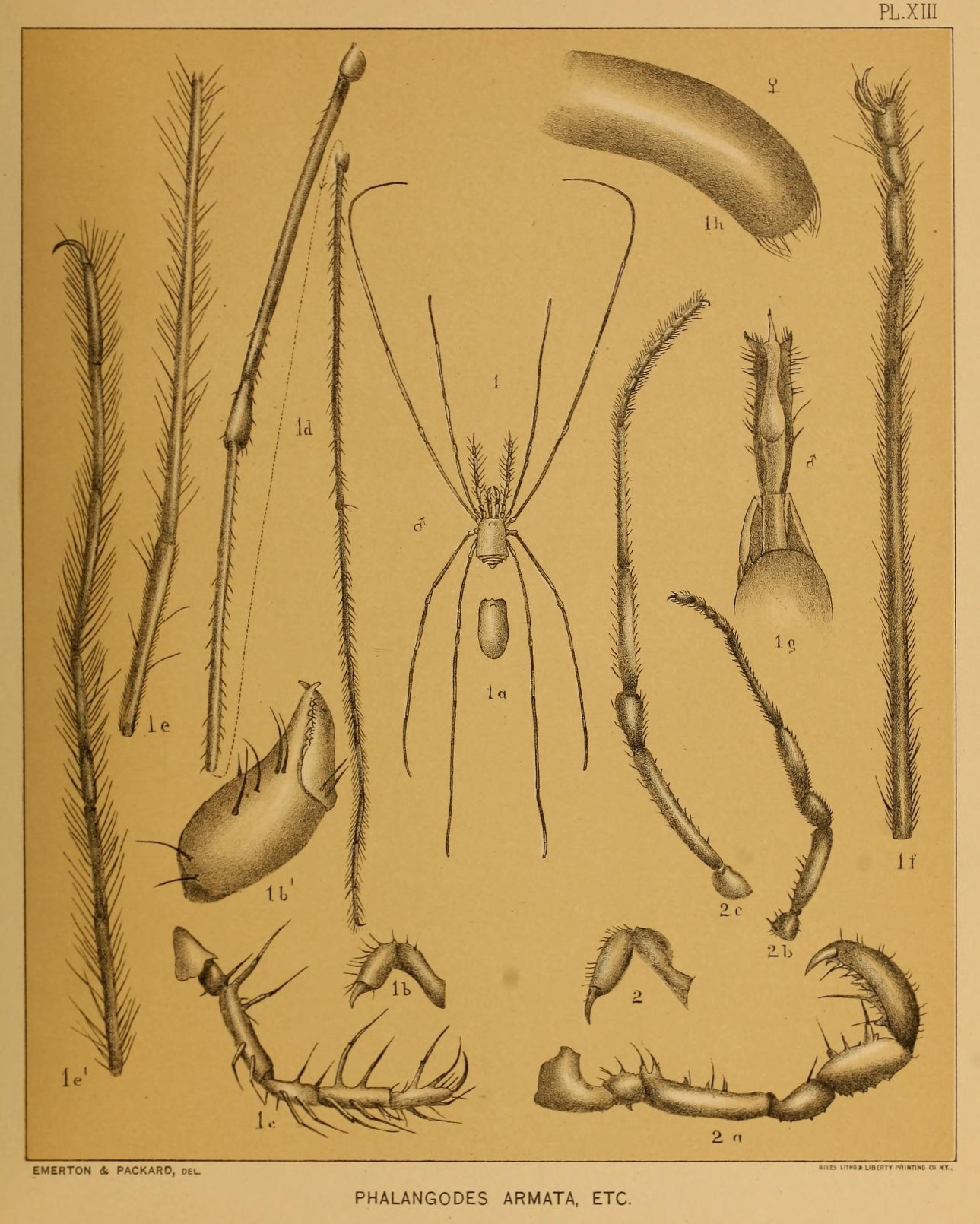
- Phalangodes armata

Scientific classification
- Kingdom: Animalia
- Phylum: Arthropoda
- Subphylum: Chelicerata
- Class: Arachnida
- Order: Opiliones
- Family: Phalangodidae
- Genus: Phalangodes; Tellkampf, 1844

= Phalangodes =

Genus of harvestmen/daddy longlegs

Phalangodes is a genus of armoured harvestmen in the family Phalangodidae. There is at least one described species in Phalangodes, P. armata.

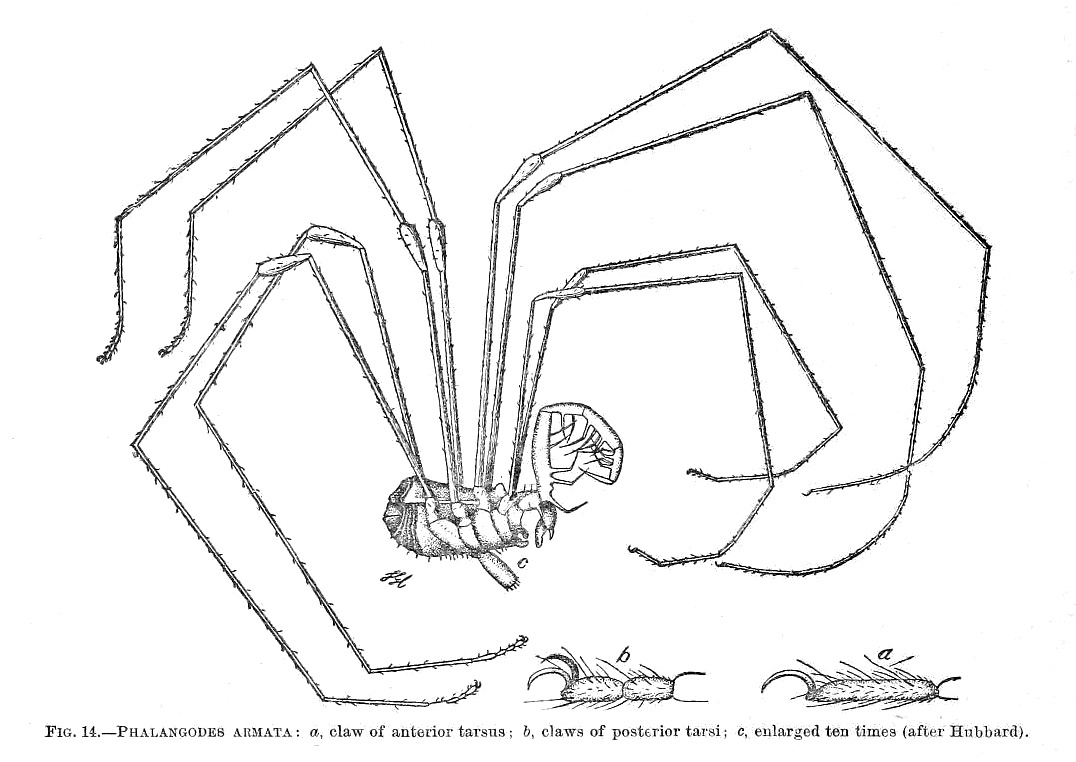
Phalangodes armata
