= Lola (harvestman) =

Scientific classification
- Domain: Eukaryota
- Kingdom: Animalia
- Phylum: Arthropoda
- Subphylum: Chelicerata
- Class: Arachnida
- Order: Opiliones
- Family: Phalangodidae
- Genus: Lola; Kratochvil, 1937

Genus of spiders

Lola is a genus of harvestmen belonging to the family Phalangodidae.

Species:

- Lola insularis Kratochvil, 1937
- Lola konavoka Ubick & Ozimec, 2019
