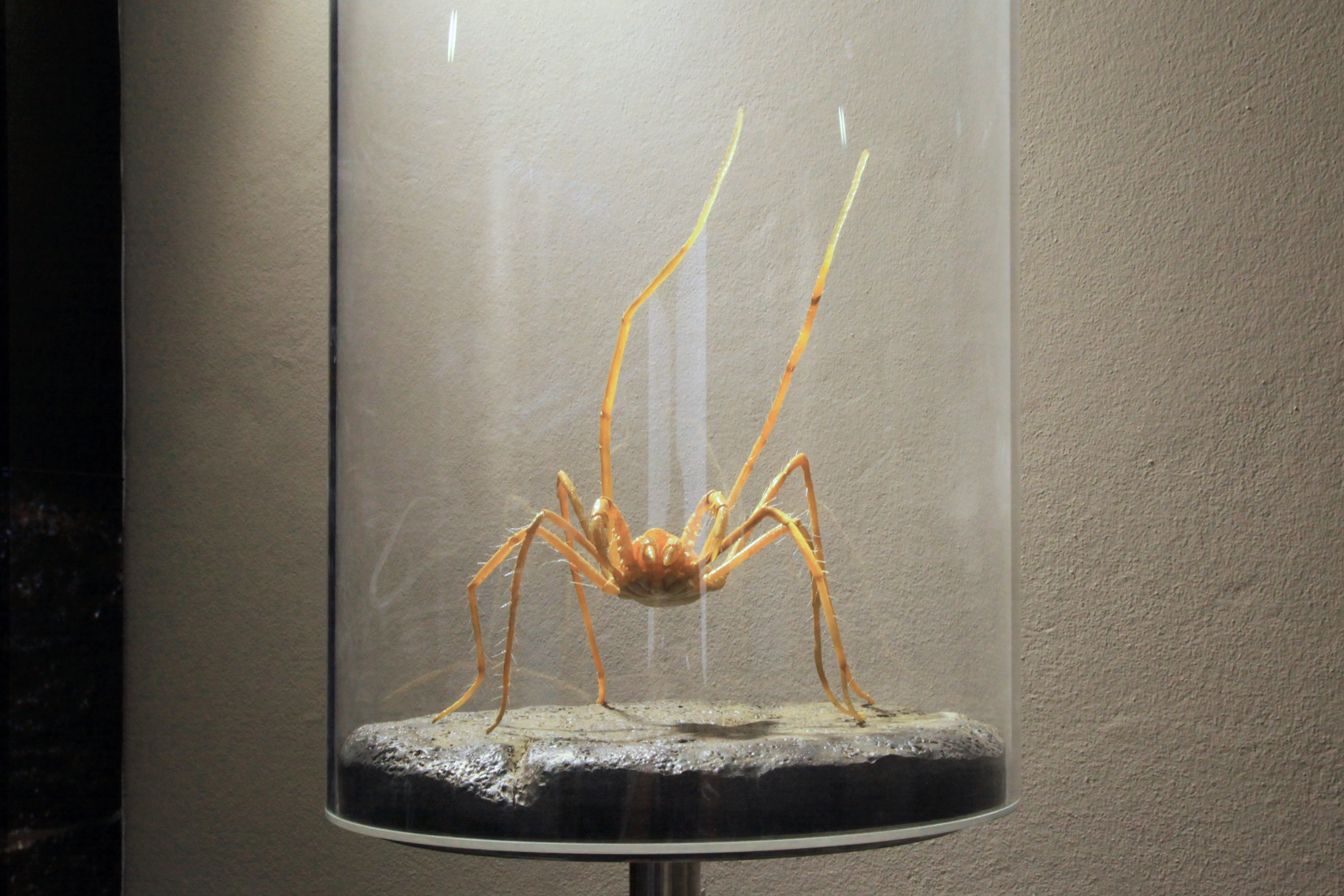
- Maiorerus randoi

Scientific classification
- Kingdom: Animalia
- Phylum: Arthropoda
- Subphylum: Chelicerata
- Class: Arachnida
- Order: Opiliones
- Family: Phalangodidae
- Genus: Maiorerus; Rambla, 1993

= Maiorerus =

Genus of spiders

Maiorerus is a genus of harvestmen belonging to the family Phalangodidae.

Species:

- Maiorerus randoi Rambla, 1993
