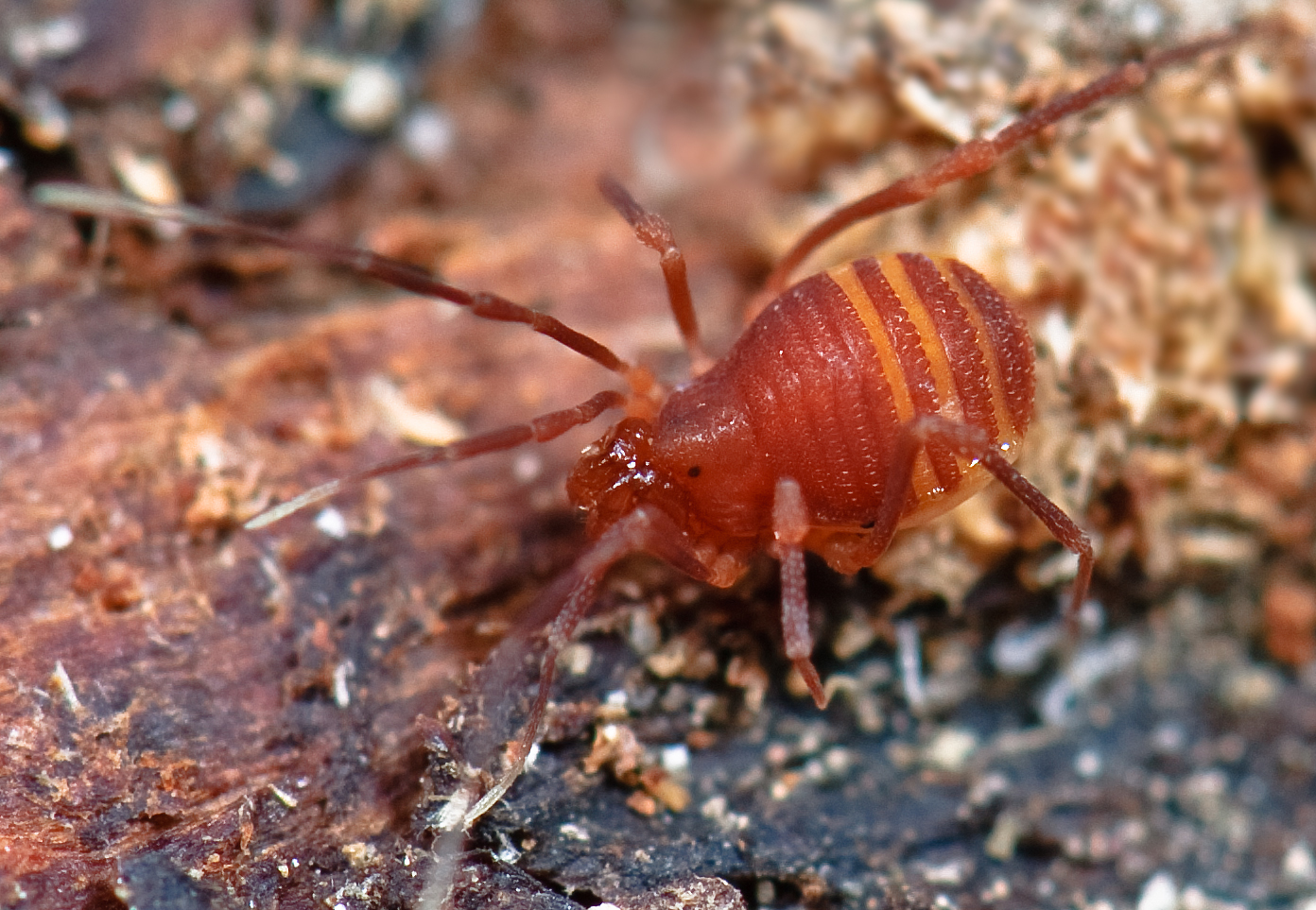
- Sitalcina sura

Scientific classification
- Domain: Eukaryota
- Kingdom: Animalia
- Phylum: Arthropoda
- Subphylum: Chelicerata
- Class: Arachnida
- Order: Opiliones
- Family: Phalangodidae
- Genus: Sitalcina; Banks, 1911

= Sitalcina =

Genus of harvestmen/daddy longlegs

Sitalcina is a genus of armoured harvestmen in the family Phalangodidae. There are about 10 described species in Sitalcina.

== Species ==
- Sitalcina borregoensis Briggs, 1968
- Sitalcina californica (Banks, 1893)
- Sitalcina catalina Ubick and Briggs, 2008
- Sitalcina chalona Briggs, 1968
- Sitalcina flava Briggs, 1968
- Sitalcina lobata C.J. Goodnight & M.L. Goodnight, 1942
- Sitalcina peacheyi Ubick & Briggs, 2008
- Sitalcina rothi Ubick & Briggs, 2008
- Sitalcina seca Ubick & Briggs, 2008
- Sitalcina sura Briggs, 1968
