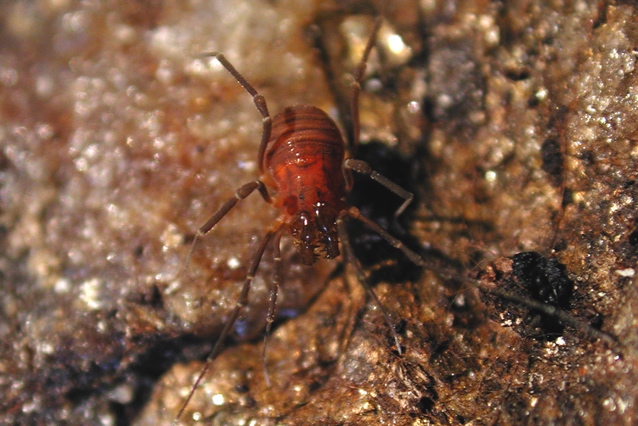

Scientific classification
- Kingdom: Animalia
- Phylum: Arthropoda
- Subphylum: Chelicerata
- Class: Arachnida
- Order: Opiliones
- Family: Phalangodidae
- Genus: Bishopella
- Species: B. laciniosa

Binomial name
- Bishopella laciniosa (Crosby & Bishop, 1924)

= Bishopella laciniosa =

Species of harvestman/daddy longlegs

Bishopella laciniosa, or Bishop's harvestman, is a species of armoured harvestman in the family Phalangodidae. It is found in North America.
