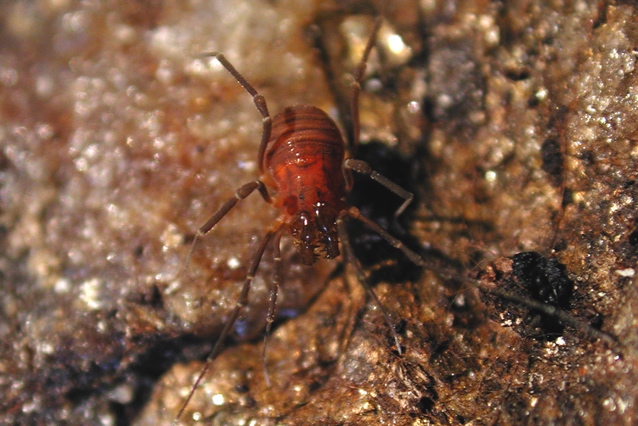
- Bishopella laciniosa

Scientific classification
- Domain: Eukaryota
- Kingdom: Animalia
- Phylum: Arthropoda
- Subphylum: Chelicerata
- Class: Arachnida
- Order: Opiliones
- Family: Phalangodidae
- Genus: Bishopella; Roewer, 1927

Type species
- Phalangodes laciniosa Crosby & Bishop, 1924

Species
- See text

= Bishopella =

Genus of harvestmen/daddy longlegs

Bishopella is a genus of the harvestman family Phalangodidae, with two described species. B. jonesi occurs only in Alabama, while B. laciniosa is found in the southeastern United States.

The genus is named in honor of S. C. Bishop, who described the type species, together with C. R. Crosby.

== Species ==
- Bishopella jonesi (Goodnight & Goodnight, 1942)
- Bishopella laciniosa (Crosby & Bishop, 1924)
