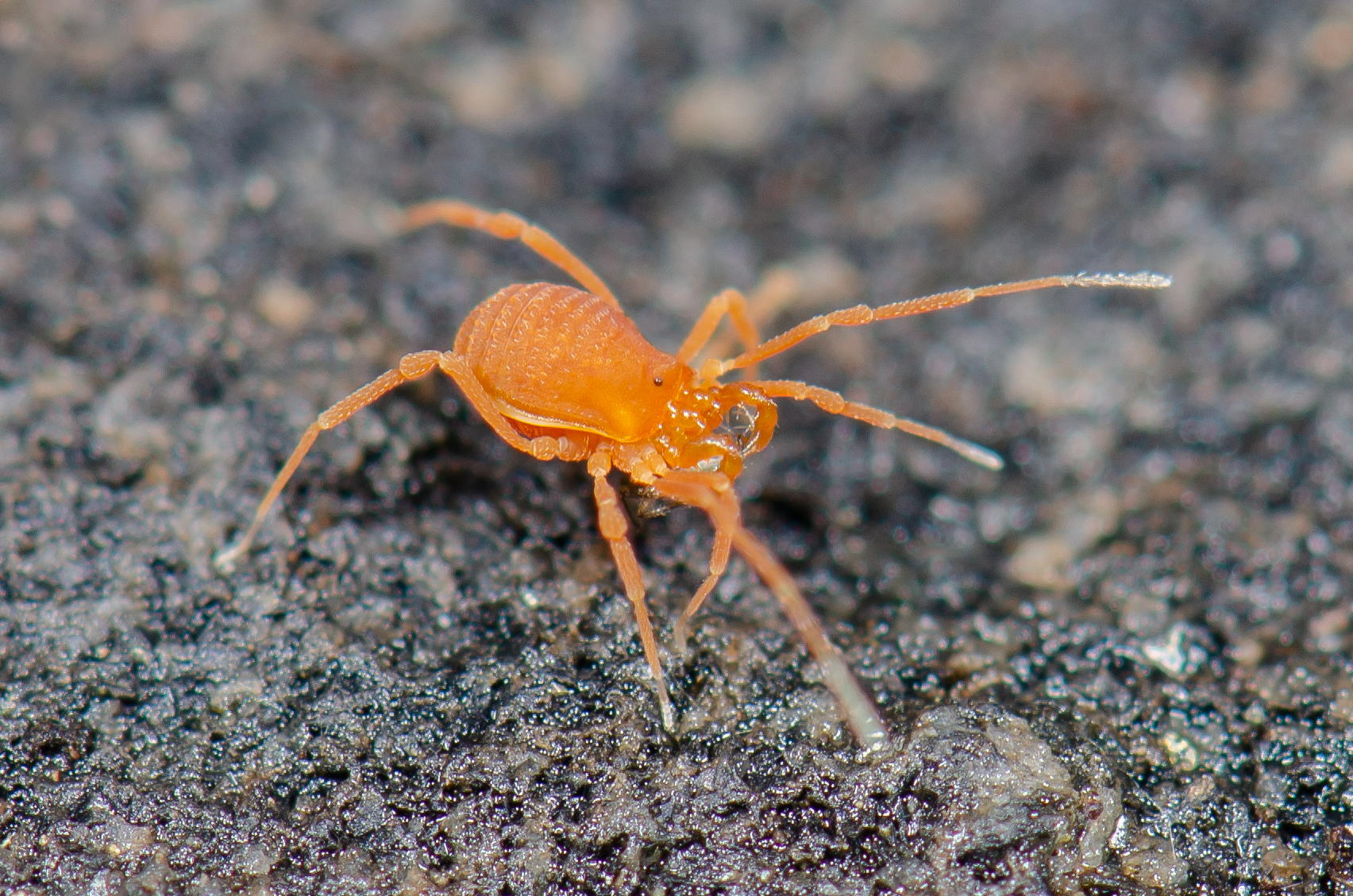
- Calicina digita

Scientific classification
- Kingdom: Animalia
- Phylum: Arthropoda
- Subphylum: Chelicerata
- Class: Arachnida
- Order: Opiliones
- Family: Phalangodidae
- Genus: Calicina; Ubick & Briggs, 1989

= Calicina =

Genus of harvestmen/daddy longlegs

Calicina is a genus of armoured harvestmen in the family Phalangodidae. There are more than 20 described species in Calicina.

== Species ==
These 25 species belong to the genus Calicina:

- Calicina arida Ubick & Briggs, 1989
- Calicina basalta Ubick & Briggs, 1989
- Calicina brevis (Briggs, 1968)
- Calicina cloughensis (Briggs & Hom, 1967)
- Calicina conifera Ubick & Briggs, 1989
- Calicina digita (Briggs & Hom, 1967)
- Calicina diminua Ubick & Briggs, 1989
- Calicina dimorphica Ubick & Briggs, 1989
- Calicina ensata (Briggs, 1968)
- Calicina galena Ubick & Briggs, 1989
- Calicina kaweahensis (Briggs & Hom, 1966)
- Calicina keenea (Briggs, 1968)
- Calicina macula (Briggs, 1968)
- Calicina mariposa (Briggs, 1968)
- Calicina mesaensis Ubick & Briggs, 1989
- Calicina minor (Briggs & Hom, 1966)
- Calicina morroensis (Briggs, 1968)
- Calicina palapraeputia (Briggs, 1968)
- Calicina piedra (Briggs, 1968)
- Calicina polina (Briggs, 1968)
- Calicina sequoia (Briggs & Hom, 1966)
- Calicina serpentinea (Briggs & Hom, 1966)
- Calicina sierra (Briggs & Hom, 1967)
- Calicina topanga (Briggs, 1968)
- Calicina yosemitensis (Briggs, 1968)
