= Ausobskya =

Scientific classification
- Kingdom: Animalia
- Phylum: Arthropoda
- Subphylum: Chelicerata
- Class: Arachnida
- Order: Opiliones
- Family: Phalangodidae
- Genus: Ausobskya; Martens, 1972

Genus of spiders

Ausobskya is a genus of harvestmen belonging to the family Phalangodidae.

Species:

- Ausobskya athos Martens, 1972
- Ausobskya brevipes Thaler, 1996
- Ausobskya hauseri Silhavy, 1976
- Ausobskya mahnerti Silhavy, 1976
