= Paralola =

Scientific classification
- Domain: Eukaryota
- Kingdom: Animalia
- Phylum: Arthropoda
- Subphylum: Chelicerata
- Class: Arachnida
- Order: Opiliones
- Family: Phalangodidae
- Genus: Paralola; Kratochvil, 1951

Genus of spiders

Paralola is a genus of harvestmen belonging to the family Phalangodidae.

Species:

- Paralola buresi Kratochvil, 1951
