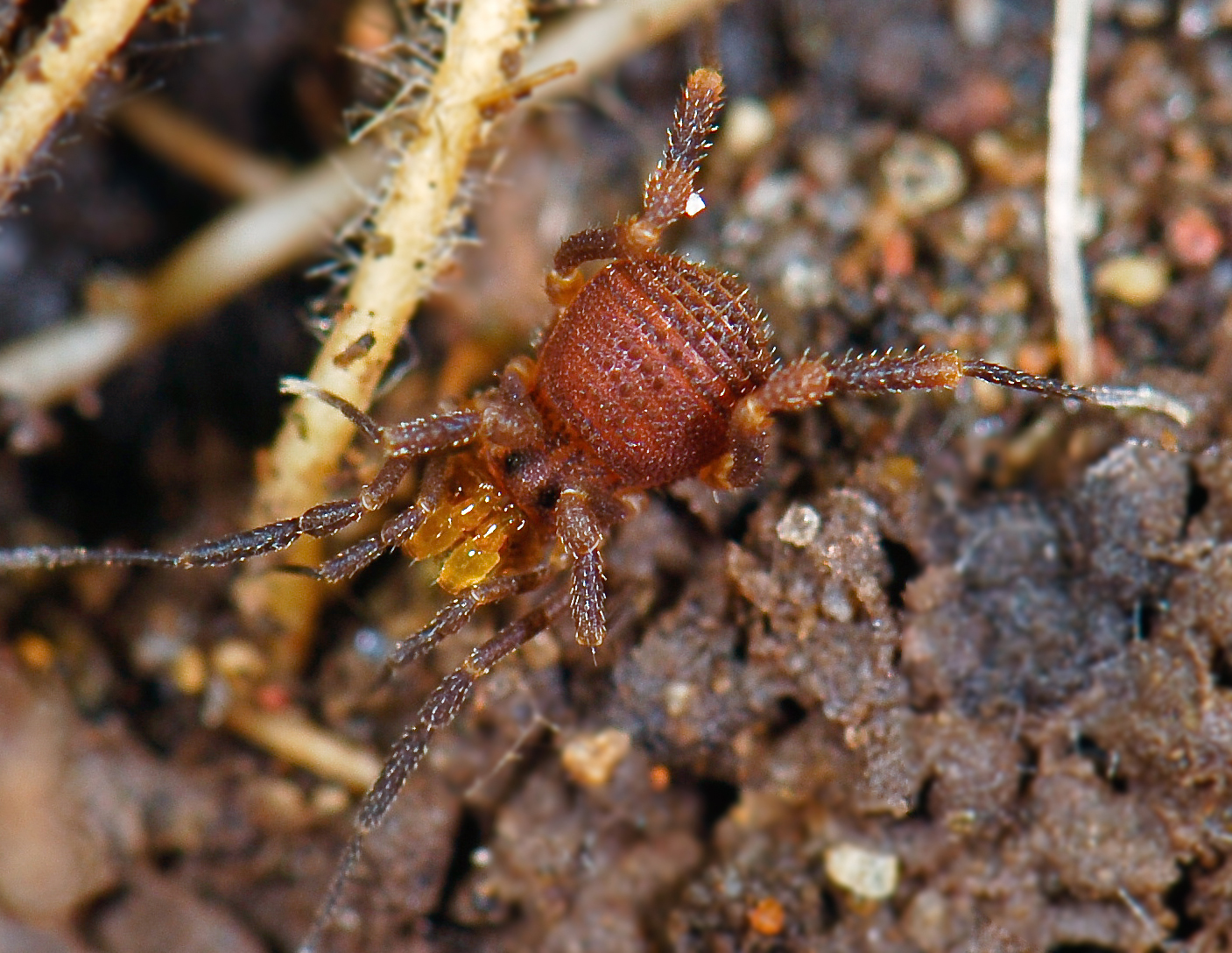
- Pellobunus insularis

Scientific classification
- Domain: Eukaryota
- Kingdom: Animalia
- Phylum: Arthropoda
- Subphylum: Chelicerata
- Class: Arachnida
- Order: Opiliones
- Suborder: Laniatores
- Infraorder: Grassatores; Kury, 2002

Superfamilies
- See text for list

= Grassatores =

Grassatores Temporal range: Cretaceous–present

Order of harvestmen/daddy longlegs

The Grassatores Kury, 2002 are the most diverse infraorder of the Laniatores. It includes over 3,700 species distributed mainly in the tropics They are characterized by the male genitalia without musculature, operated by hydraulic pressure and by the double tarsal claws of posterior legs.

== Superfamilies ==
- Assamioidea Sørensen, 1886
- Epedanoidea Sørensen, 1886
- Gonyleptoidea Sundevall, 1833
- Phalangodoidea Simon, 1879
- Samooidea Sørensen, 1886
- Sandokanoidea Özdikmen & Kury, 2007
- Zalmoxoidea Sørensen, 1886

Beyond the above, there are several other genera such as Metapellobunus that are often included in the Infraorder, but due to their uncertain taxonomic affinities some researchers have treated as Grassatores incertae sedis.
