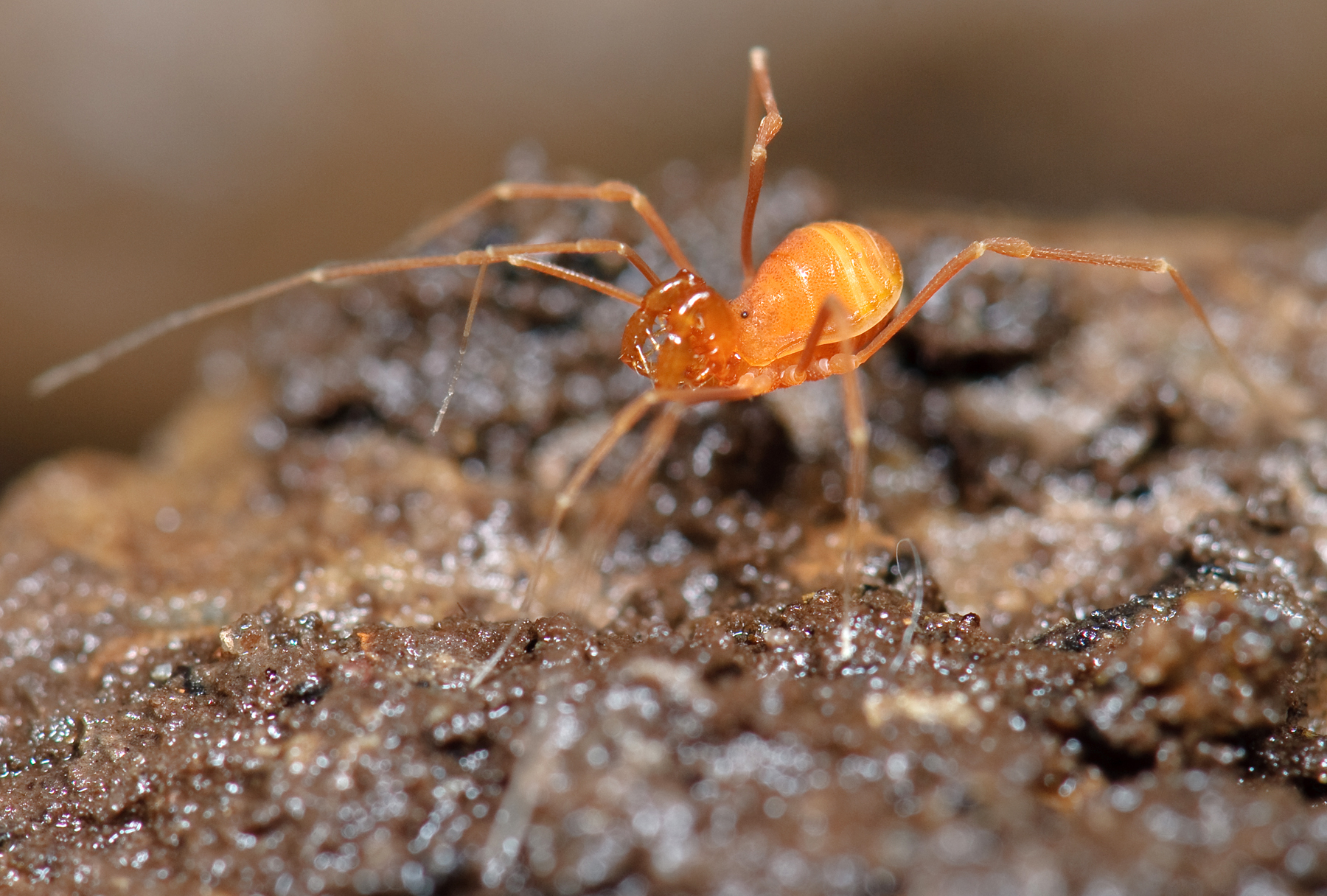
- Crosbyella distincta

Scientific classification
- Kingdom: Animalia
- Phylum: Arthropoda
- Subphylum: Chelicerata
- Class: Arachnida
- Order: Opiliones
- Family: Phalangodidae
- Genus: Crosbyella; Roewer, 1927

= Crosbyella =

Genus of harvestmen/daddy longlegs

Crosbyella is a genus of armoured harvestmen in the family Phalangodidae. There are about five described species in Crosbyella.

== Species ==
These five species belong to the genus Crosbyella:

- Crosbyella distincta C.J. Goodnight & M.L. Goodnight, 1942
- Crosbyella montana C.J. Goodnight & M.L. Goodnight, 1942
- Crosbyella roeweri C.J. Goodnight & M.L. Goodnight, 1942
- Crosbyella spinturnix (Crosby & Bishop, 1924)
- Crosbyella tuberculata C.J. Goodnight & M.L. Goodnight, 1942
