= Clarence J. Goodnight =

American zoologist (1914–1987)

Clarence James Goodnight (May 30, 1914 – August 9, 1987) was an American zoologist who made contributions to the study of freshwater annelids and harvestmen (Opiliones). He was professor at Brooklyn College, Purdue University, and Western Michigan University. Goodnight was born in Gillespie, Illinois. He earned an associate degree at Blackburn College, then earned his bachelor's, master's, and PhD at the University of Illinois. He produced over 150 publications, including three textbooks. He served as president of the American Microscopical Society (1971), secretary of the American Society of Zoologists, and secretary of the North American Benthological Society. In 1940 he married Marie Louise Ostendorf (1916–1998), with whom he co-authored many publications and described over 300 species, including more than 120 species of Mexican harvestmen.

11 species are named in his honor:

- Cambarincola goodnighti Holt, 1973
- Crosbycus goodnighti Roewer, 1951
- Cryptocellus goodnighti Platnick & Shadab, 1981
- Cynorta goodnighti Beutelspacher, 1988
- Ethobunus goodnighti (Rambla, 1969)
- Geaya goodnighti Roewer, 1953
- Gnomulus goodnighti (Suzuki, 1977)
- Jubus goodnighti O.Park, 1952
- Metagonia goodnighti Gertsch, 1977
- Mexobisium goodnighti Muchmore, 1973
- Phrurolithus goodnighti Muma, 1945

== Books ==
- Zoology. St. Louis: C.V. Mosby Co. 1954. (with M. L. Goodnight)
- Biology, an Introduction to the Science of Life. New York: Wiley. 1962. (with M. L. Goodnight and R. R. Armacost)
- General Zoology. New York: Reinhold Publishing Corp. 1964. (with M. L. Goodnight and P. Gray)
