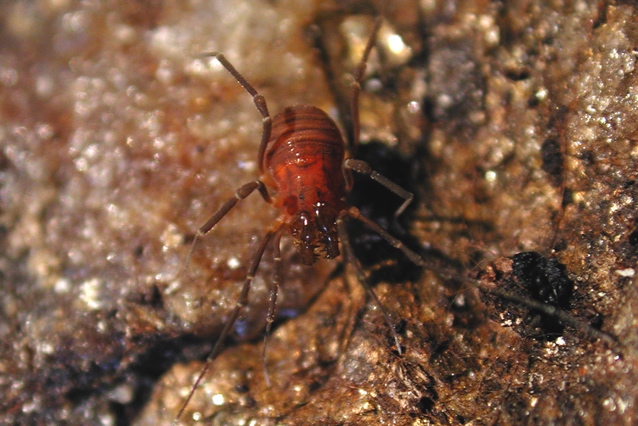
- Bishopella laciniosa

Scientific classification
- Kingdom: Animalia
- Phylum: Arthropoda
- Subphylum: Chelicerata
- Class: Arachnida
- Order: Opiliones
- Suborder: Laniatores
- Infraorder: Grassatores
- Superfamily: Phalangodoidea
- Family: Phalangodidae; Simon, 1879

Synonyms
- Paralolidae Kratochvíl, 1958; Lolinae Kratochvíl, 1958

= Phalangodidae =

Family of harvestmen/daddy longlegs

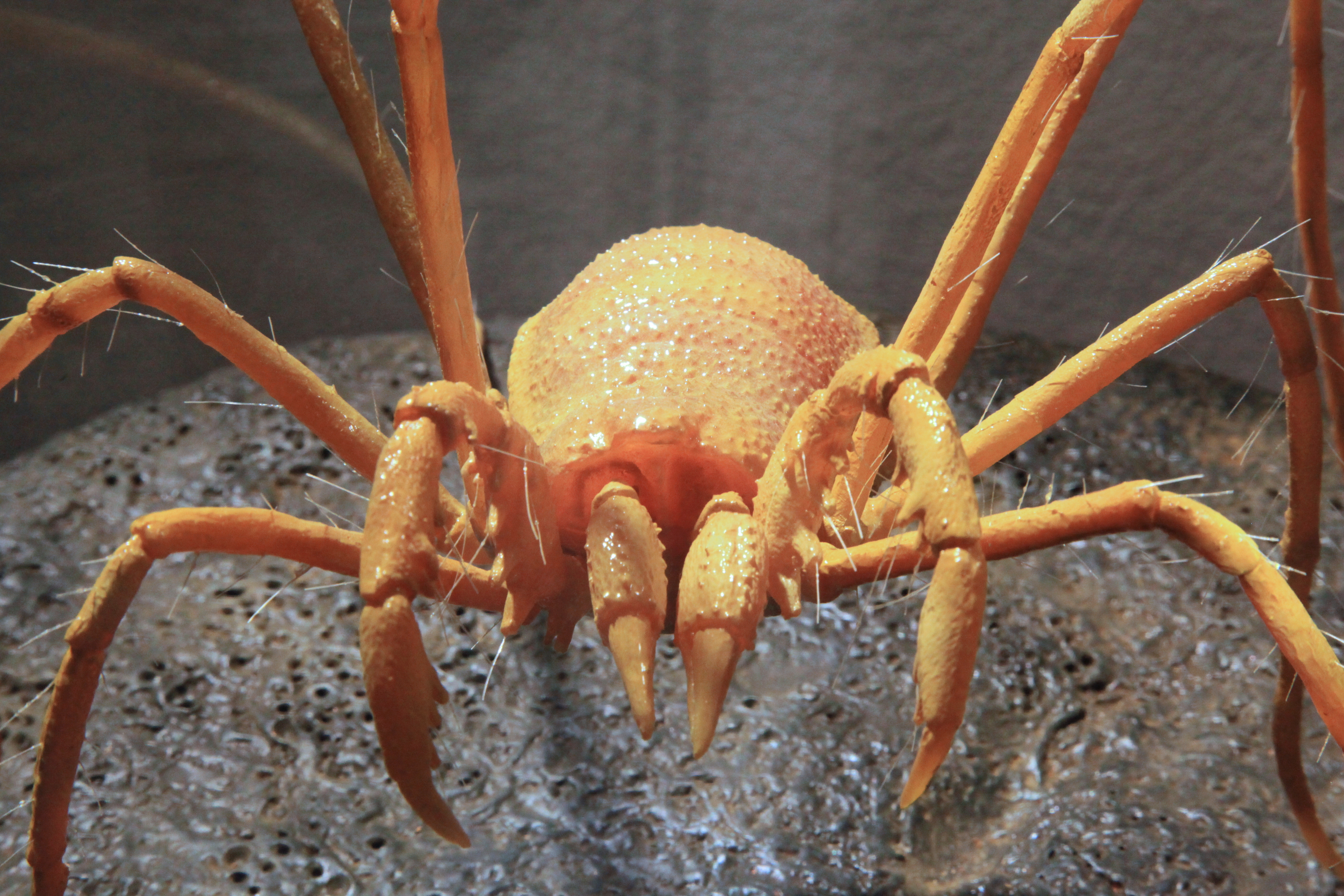
Maiorerus randoi (model)

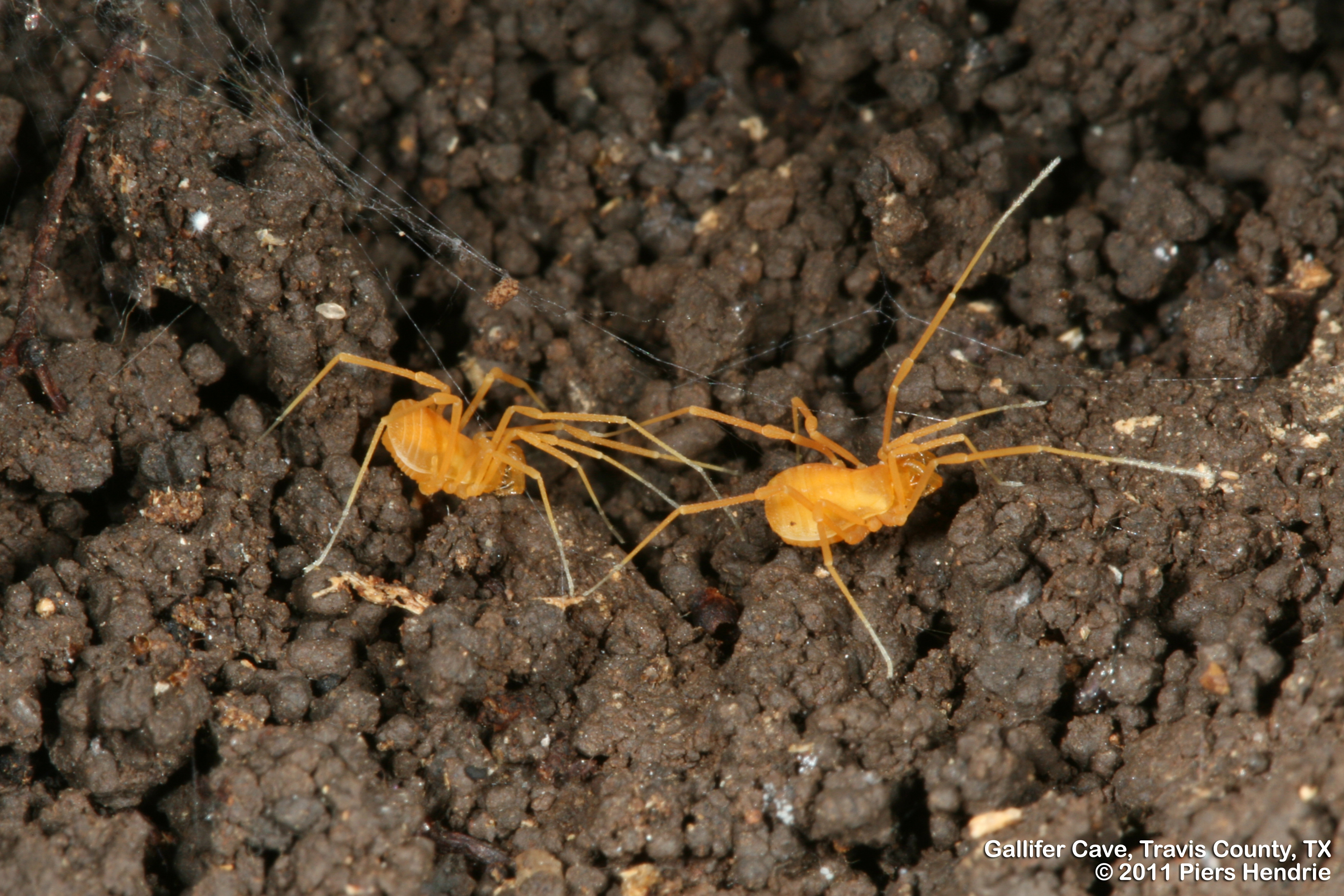
Texella reyesi

The Phalangodidae are a family of harvestmen with about 30 genera and more than 100 described species, distributed in the Holarctic region.

It is not to be confused with the harvestman family Phalangiidae, which is in the suborder Eupnoi.

== Name ==
The name of the type genus Phalangodes is derived from Ancient Greek φάλαγξ (phalanx), a line of soldiers in formation. This probably refers to the rows of pedipalpal spines.

== Description ==
Body length ranges from less than 1 mm to about 3 mm (0.12 in). The pedipalps are armed with large spines. While some species have legs eight times the body length, others have shorter legs around twice the body length. Most species are yellowish to orange brown. Troglobitic (cave-dwelling) species are depigmented.

== Distribution ==
More than two-thirds of the species occur in the western Nearctic, especially in California with about 50 species in four endemic genera. About 10 species are known from the eastern Nearctic. Few occur in the Palearctic, with one species each in the Canary Islands and Japan, and about 20 species in the Mediterranean region.

== Relationships ==
The family seems to be largely monophyletic, with the exceptions of a few genera such as Guerrobunus and Glennhuntia. Although the relationship of the Phalangodidae to other Grassatores is currently unresolved, the family seems relatively basal inside the Grassatores.

== Genera ==
The family Phalangodidae contains these genera:

- Ausobskya Martens, 1972^{c g} — Greece (four species)
- Banksula Roewer, 1949^{i c g b} — USA (California) (10 or 11 species)
- Bishopella Roewer, 1927^{i c g b} — USA (southeastern states) (two species)
- Bogania Forster, 1955^{c g} — Australia (five species)
- Bunofagea Staręga, 1992 ^{c g} — Madagscar (two species)
- Calicina Ubick & Briggs, 1989^{i c g b} — USA (California) (25 species)
- Chinquipellobunus Goodnight and Goodnight, 1944^{i c g}
- Crosbyella Roewer, 1927^{i c g b} — southeastern US (five species)
- Enigmina Ubick & Briggs, 2008^{i c g b}
- Glennhuntia Shear, 2001 — western Australia (one species; probably misplaced)
- Guerrobunus Goodnight & Goodnight, 1945 — Mexico (three species, probably misplaced)
- Lola Kratochvil, 1937^{g} — Israel (one species)
- Maiorerus Rambla, 1993^{g} — Canary Islands (one species)
- Megacina Ubick & Briggs, 2008^{i c g b}
- Microcina Briggs & Ubick, 1989^{i c g b} — California (six species)
- Microcinella Ubick & Briggs, 2008^{i c g b}
- Neoparalus Özdikmen, 2006^{i c g}
- Paralola Kratochvil, 1951^{g} — Bulgaria (one species)
- Phalangodes Tellkampf, 1844^{i c g b} — Kentucky, Cuba? (two species; one species possibly misplaced)
- Phalangomma Roewer, 1949 — Virginia (one species; probably misplaced)
- Proscotolemon Roewer, 1916 — Japan (one species)
- Ptychosoma Sørensen, 1873 — Spain, Italy, North Africa (two species)
- Scotolemon Lucas, 1860^{g} — Mediterranean (13 species)
- Sitalcina Banks, 1911^{i c g b} — California (9 species)
- Spalicus Roewer, 1949^{i c g}
- Texella C.J. Goodnight & M.L. Goodnight, 1942^{i c g b} — Texas, California, Oregon, New Mexico (28 species)
- Tolus C.J. Goodnight & M.L. Goodnight, 1942^{i c g b} — Tennessee (one species)
- Tularina Ubick & Briggs, 2008^{i c g b}
- Undulus C.J. Goodnight & M.L. Goodnight, 1942^{i c g b} — Alabama (one species)
- Wespus C.J. Goodnight & M.L. Goodnight, 1942^{i c g b} — Arkansas (one species)

- Alpazia Özdikmen & Kury, 2006^{i c g}
- Haasus Roewer, 1949 (See Pyramidopidae)

Data sources: i = ITIS, c = Catalogue of Life, g = GBIF, b = Bugguide.net
