= Government Canyon State Natural Area =

Protected area in Texas, United States

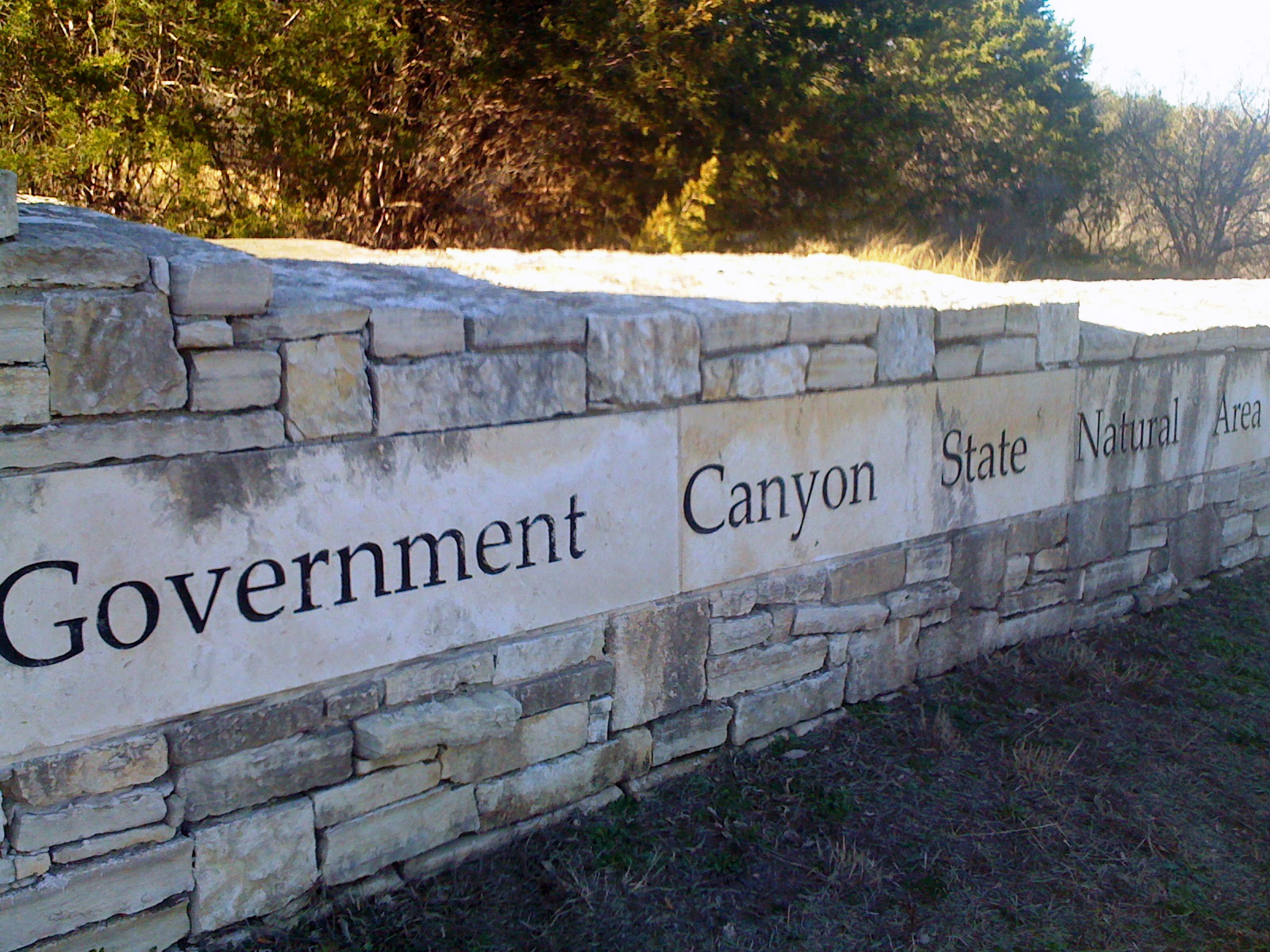

- Location within Texas Location within the United States
- Location: Bexar County, Texas, United States
- Nearest city: San Antonio
- Coordinates: 29.548°N 98.765°W
- Area: 13,067 acres (52.88 km^{2})
- Established: 1993
- Visitors: 81,756 (in 2025)
- Governing body: Texas Parks and Wildlife Department
- Website: Government State Natural Area

First opened to the public in October, 2005, Government Canyon State Natural Area (GCSNA) preserves 13,067 acres (52.9 km^{2}; 20.4 sq mi) of rugged hills and canyons typical of the Texas Hill Country. It is designated a Natural Area, rather than a State Park, and therefore the primary focus is maintenance and protection of the property's natural state. Accordingly, access and recreational activities may be restricted if the Texas Parks & Wildlife Department (TPWD) deems such action necessary to protect the environment.

The reserve is located in northwestern Bexar County, and protects a large, relatively pristine tract of Hill Country terrain, numerous and diverse species of plants & wildlife, the upper Culebra Creek/Leon Creek watershed, and a critical aquifer recharge zone for the San Antonio Water System.

In September, 2009, the City of San Antonio transferred 3,000 acres (12 km^{2}) of land to the TPWD for inclusion in the Natural Area, specifically to support long-term protection of the Edwards Aquifer, and thereby increasing the total acreage within the reserve from 8,783 acres (35.54 km^{2}) to 11,783 acres (47.68 km^{2}). In April, 2013, an additional 461 acres (1.87 km^{2}) were added to GCSNA through a combination of funding from the City of San Antonio, Texas Parks & Wildlife, and a US Fish & Wildlife Service endangered species grant, which brought the reserve's total area to 12,244 acres (49.55 km^{2}). Most recently, in late 2024, TPWD authorized the acquisition of 823 acres adjacent to the Natural Area to bring its total acreage to 13,067.

== History ==
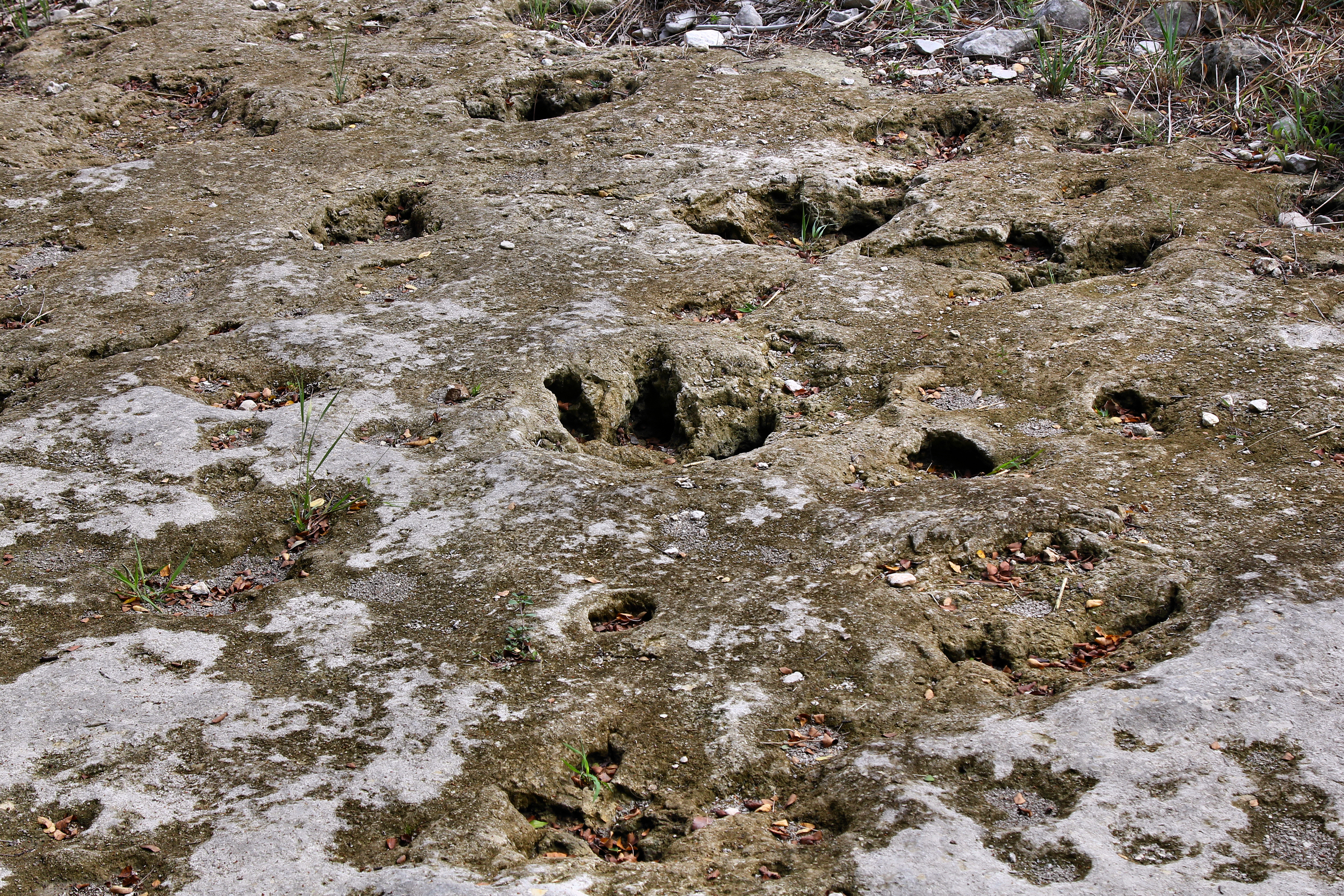
Theropod trackway

110 million years ago, during the Cretaceous period, much of Texas was covered by a shallow sea. As the sea receded, dinosaurs walking in the moist mud left behind tracks in the mud. Sediment filled the tracks and the mud turned to limestone. The sediment washed away and trackways are visible when conditions are dry. There are three main trackways made by theropods and sauropods, which researchers believe to be Acrocanthosaurus and Sauroposeidon.

Archaeologists believe Native Americans occupied the area up to 8,000 years ago as evidenced by a burnt midden uncovered in the park. In the early 1850s, government surveyors laid out a military supply route through this area to western frontier forts. The locals called it the “government road” that was being built through the “government’s canyon” giving the park its name. European settlers came to the area around the 1860s. The clear springs, fertile floodplains and lush grasslands supported their farming and ranching activities. An old house and barn still exist as a reminder of the park's heritage.

== Animals ==
As in much of the Hill Country, white-tailed deer are by far the most common large mammal on the property. Additionally, Mexican long-nosed armadillo, striped skunk, common raccoon, Virginia opossum, eastern cottontail, black-tailed jackrabbit, and eastern fox squirrel are present. Feral pigs, exotic axis deer, North American porcupine, rock squirrel, and the elusive ringtail may occasionally be encountered. Bobcat, coyote, both red and grey fox, and rarely, mountain lion, also inhabit the area, but are seldom seen by visitors. Reptiles documented include the Texas alligator lizard, Texas coral snake, broad-banded copperhead, and western diamondback rattlesnake.

Among the many bird species present, GCSNA includes critical nesting habitats of the black-capped vireo and the golden-cheeked warbler, which is classified as endangered under federal law. Common birds sighted include mourning dove, white-winged dove, inca dove, black vulture, turkey vulture, wild turkey, eastern phoebe, white-eyed vireo, Carolina wren, northern mockingbird, lesser goldfinch, northern cardinal, desert cardinal, Cooper’s hawk, red-shouldered hawk, and red-tailed hawk.

The major topography of GCSNA is karst. GCSNA is host to six endangered karst invertebrates: Government Canyon Bat Cave meshweaver, Government Canyon Bat Cave spider, Madla Cave meshweaver, two species of ground beetles (Rhadine exilis and Rhadine infernalis) and the Helotes mold beetle.

== Plants ==
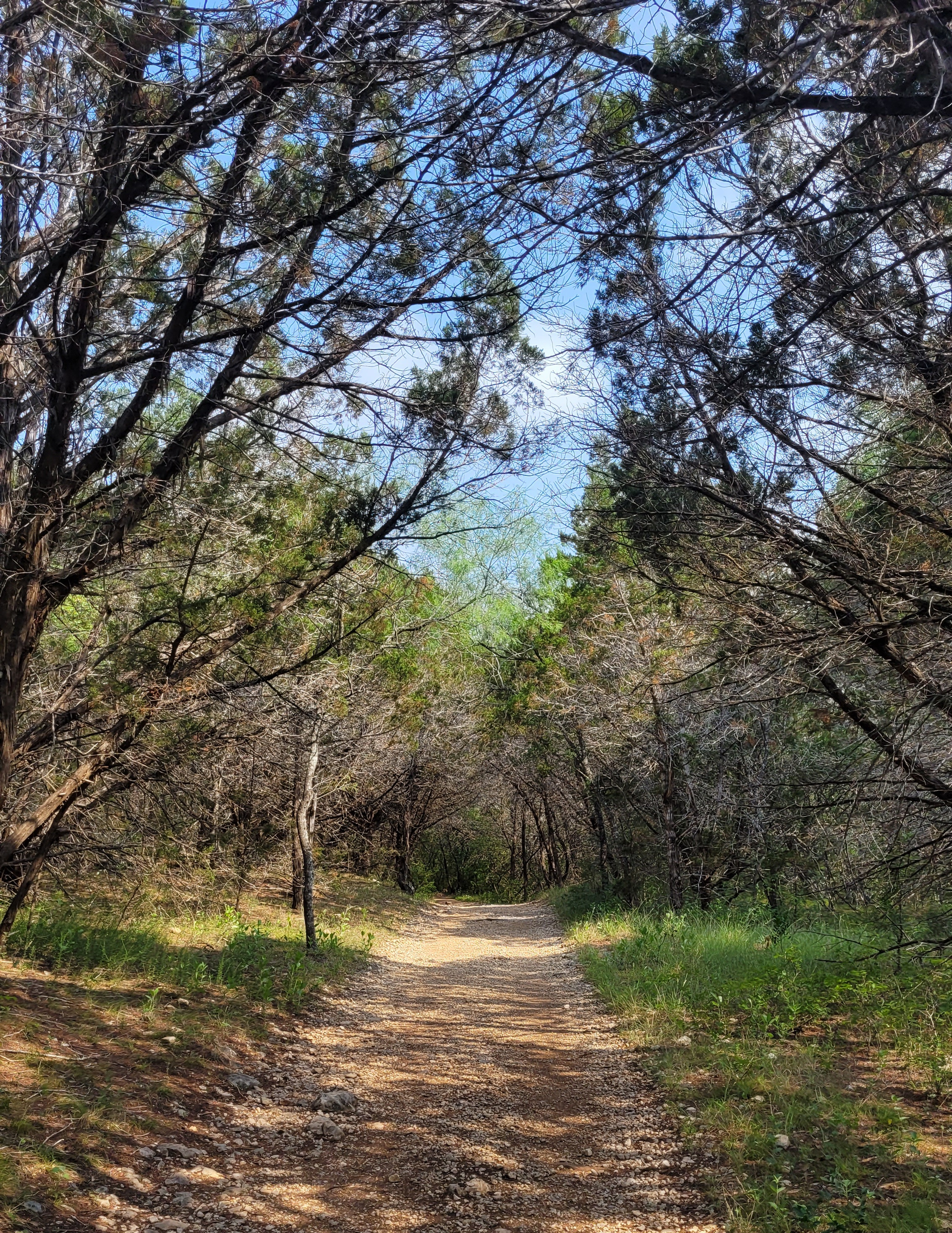

A wide variety of trees are found in the park such as ashe juniper, plateau live oak, Texas red oak, American sycamore, honey mesquite, Texas persimmon, mountain laurel, Texas madrone, eastern redbud, hackberry, cedar elm, and Texas mulberry. Vines like mustang grape and poison ivy grow among the trees.

Some common plants are prickly pear cactus, twisted-leaf yucca, sotol, agarita, Turk's cap, scarlet sage, wafer ash, frostweed, Texas bluebonnet and goldeneye phlox. Open areas support many grasses such as inland sea oats and Lindheimer muhly.

== Visitors ==
GCSNA is open to the public 7am – 10pm (Fri. – Mon.) and 7am – 8pm (Tues. – Thurs.) each week, weather permitting, and offers 40 miles (64 km) of hiking/biking trails, with over 500 feet (150 m) of elevation change found within the reserve's boundaries. Entrance fee: $6 per adult; children 12 and under, free. The Natural Area allows overnight camping in the "Front Country" designated areas only. There are regular walk-in, 50–60 yards (46–55 m), campsites and two group walk-in campsites that allow up to 16 persons per site.

TPWD urges all visitors to respect the LEAVE NO TRACE set of wilderness ethics when visiting the Natural Area: 1) Plan Ahead and Prepare, 2) Travel on Marked Trails Only, 3) Always Dispose of Waste Properly, 4) Leave Behind What You Find, 5) Never Build An Open Fire, 6) Respect All Wildlife, and 7) Be Considerate of Other Visitors.

== See also ==
- List of Texas state parks

== Other sources ==
- Texas Parks & Wildlife: City of San Antonio Transfers Almost 3,000 Acres to Government Canyon
- My San Antonio: City gives 3,000 acres of Government Canyon to state
- Leon Springs Business Association: City land to go to Government Canyon
- My San Antonio: City earns praise for land transfer
- My San Antonio: 461 more acres for Government Canyon
