= Cicurina baronia =

Conservation status
- Endangered (ESA)

- Critically Imperiled (NatureServe)

Scientific classification
- Kingdom: Animalia
- Phylum: Arthropoda
- Subphylum: Chelicerata
- Class: Arachnida
- Order: Araneae
- Infraorder: Araneomorphae
- Family: Cicurinidae
- Genus: Cicurina
- Species: C. baronia

Binomial name
- Cicurina baronia Gertsch, 1992

Species of spider

Cicurina baronia is a rare species of spider in the family Cicurinidae known by the common name Robber Baron cave meshweaver. The species is endemic to the San Antonio, Texas area of the United States. It is one of nine species deemed the Bexar County Invertebrates, as all nine are found in similar cave environments in the central region of Texas. These species range in size from one millimetre to one centimetre. They are also eyeless or essentially eyeless and pale in coloration.

== Habitat ==
The Bexar County Invertebrates are troglobites, species which spend their entire lives in subterranean environments, inhabiting karst limestone caves and mesocaverns. Currently, these species have only been found in the karst areas in Bexar county, which were deemed critical habitats to the species in a 2012 ruling. C. baronia specifically has only been positively identified in the Robber Baron Cave and one other cave in Alamo heights (Bexar County Distribution). Nutrient sources in this environment include leaf litter, animal droppings, and animal carcasses, making the cave ecosystem very dependent on the habitat on the surface. Troglobites also require stable temperatures and high humidity, with the cave temperature typically being close to the annual surface temperature but with much less variation. Relative humidity in the caves is normally near 100%, and relative temperature is 71°F (around 22°C).

== Conservation ==
C. baronia is one of nine invertebrates endemic to the karst caves of Bexar County that were federally listed as endangered species in the year 2000. All of the Bexar County Invertebrates face high degrees of threat but vary in their potential for recovery. A five-year review was published in 2011 alongside a recovery plan for the nine species. They did not change the overall classification of the species, but recommended lowering the recovery priority number for C. baronia and Texella cokendolpheri to 5C, compared to the 2C of the other seven species. The reason for this lowered recovery priority is because the likelihood that the species can recover is low considering that it is known from only two caves and occurs in an area that is highly urbanized. The species faces serious threats of habitat destruction due to urbanization and human activity on the surface where the cave entrances are located. Nonnative fire ants also present a threat to this species as they have the same habitat and nutrient sources.

== Conservation threats ==
Habitat destruction and interference is the major threat to this species because of the high levels of urbanization in the cave areas. Some ways in which the habitat has been impacted include being filled with cement during construction, quarrying activities, and sealing of cave entrances. These activities lead to loss of the already limited habitat range. Human traffic is also a threat with the high levels of urbanization surrounding the cave's entrances, but organizations such as the Texas Cave Management Association and the Friends of Robber Baron have worked to limit the number of people who are allowed in the areas around cave entrances. Changes to the surface habitat also affect the cave habitat as altered drainage patterns and plant and animal compositions contribute to the degradation of the habitat.

=== Recovery strategy ===
The current recovery strategy is from September 2011, and applies to all nine Bexar County invertebrate species. The plan primarily involves the protection of karst areas to ensure the long-term survival of the species. Protections such as keeping the caves and their entrances free from human disruptions such as construction and excessive visitations, as well as protection from nonnative fire ants. Maintenance of the surface habitat is also important, as the underground habitat is dependent on it. The main habitat for C. baronia and several of the Bexar County Invertebrates, Robber Baron Cave, is only open to the public during semi-annual events to prevent further habitat destruction.

One problem faced when creating a recovery plan is the inability to determine an accurate population estimate for the species. The habitat, size, and behaviors of the species makes it difficult to find and identify. Without information of past or present population sizes, it is difficult to determine the exact threat the species is under and what conservation efforts will be the most effective. The same plan is proposed for all nine of the Bexar County Karst Invertebrate due to a general lack of knowledge about many of the species. Because many elements of these species are unknown, increased research is a vital component of the recovery strategy. More information and insight into the behaviors and habitat of these species will allow for more concentrated and helpful conservation efforts.
