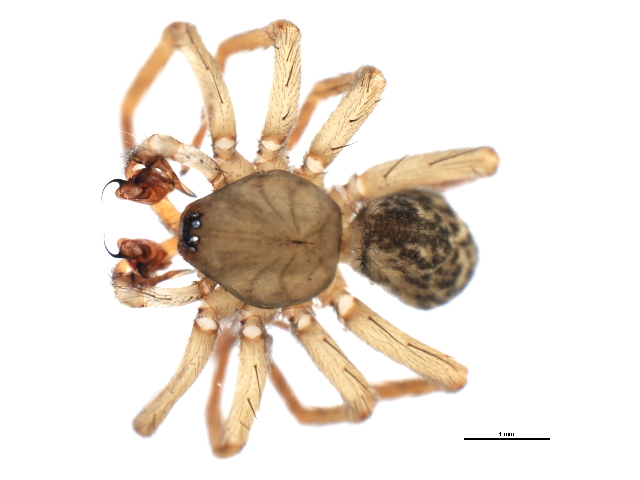
- C. robusta, adult male

Conservation status
- Secure (NatureServe)

Scientific classification
- Kingdom: Animalia
- Phylum: Arthropoda
- Subphylum: Chelicerata
- Class: Arachnida
- Order: Araneae
- Infraorder: Araneomorphae
- Family: Cicurinidae
- Genus: Cicurina
- Species: C. robusta

Binomial name
- Cicurina robusta Simon, 1886

= Cicurina robusta =

Species of spider

Cicurina robusta is a species of spider in the family Cicurinidae. It is found in the United States.
