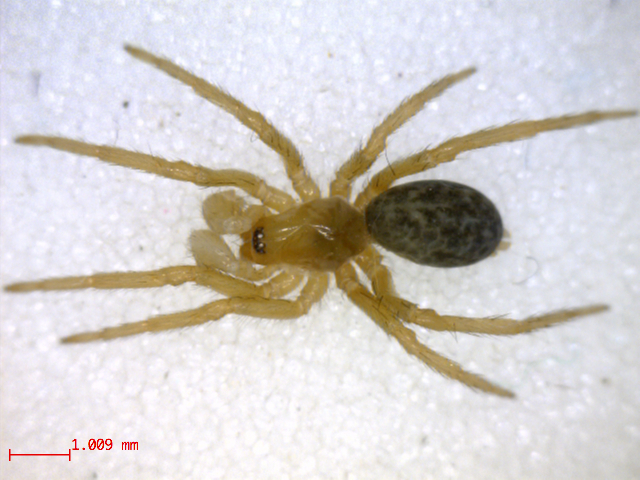
- C. arcuata, male
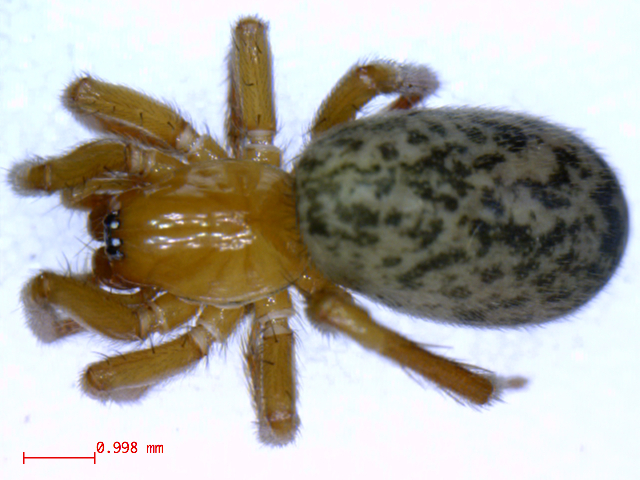
- C. arcuata, female

Conservation status
- Secure (NatureServe)

Scientific classification
- Kingdom: Animalia
- Phylum: Arthropoda
- Subphylum: Chelicerata
- Class: Arachnida
- Order: Araneae
- Infraorder: Araneomorphae
- Family: Cicurinidae
- Genus: Cicurina
- Species: C. arcuata

Binomial name
- Cicurina arcuata Keyserling, 1887

= Cicurina arcuata =

Species of spider

Cicurina arcuata is a species of spider in the family Cicurinidae. It is found in the United States and Canada.
