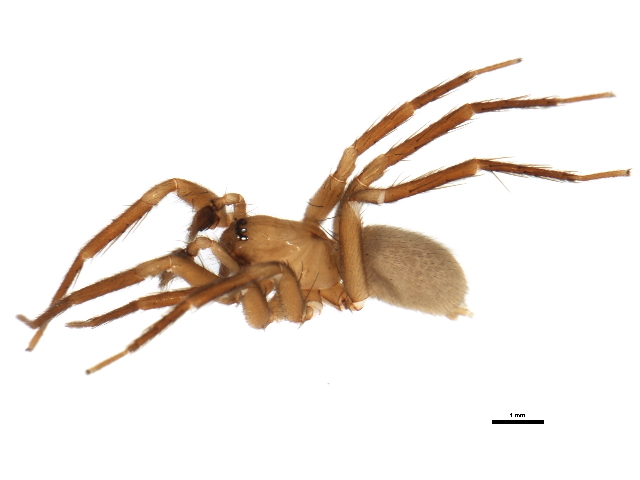
- C. pallida, adult male
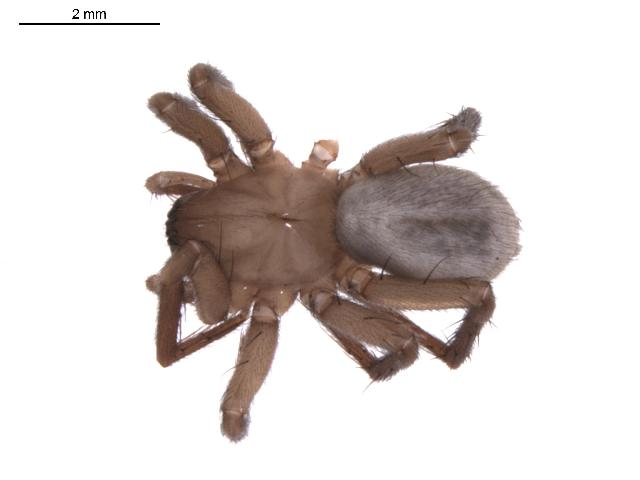
- C. pallida, adult female

Scientific classification
- Kingdom: Animalia
- Phylum: Arthropoda
- Subphylum: Chelicerata
- Class: Arachnida
- Order: Araneae
- Infraorder: Araneomorphae
- Family: Cicurinidae
- Genus: Cicurina
- Species: C. pallida

Binomial name
- Cicurina pallida Keyserling, 1887

= Cicurina pallida =

Species of spider

Cicurina pallida is a species of spider in the family Cicurinidae. It is found in the United States.
