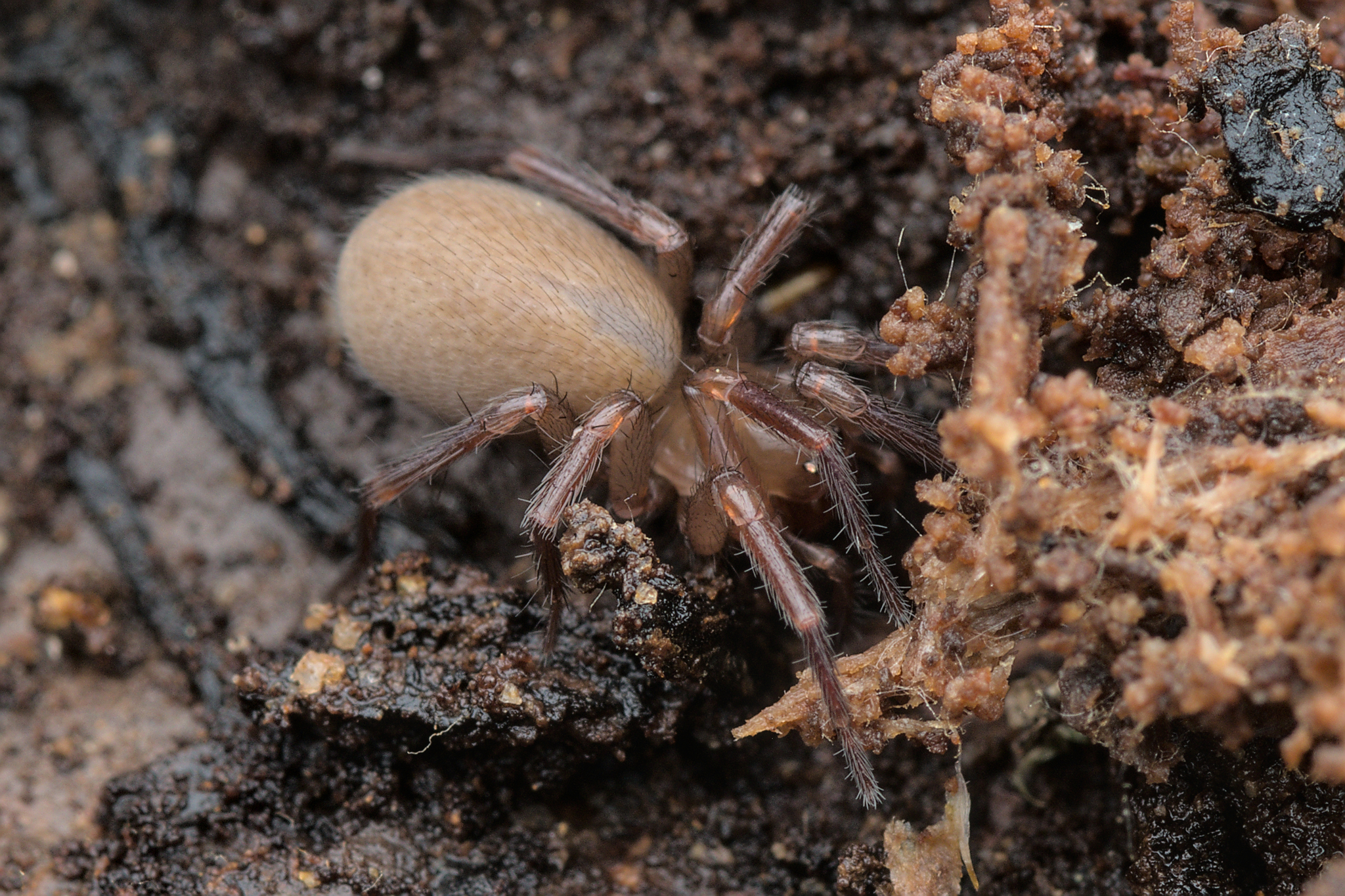
- Cicurina cicur

Scientific classification
- Kingdom: Animalia
- Phylum: Arthropoda
- Subphylum: Chelicerata
- Class: Arachnida
- Order: Araneae
- Infraorder: Araneomorphae
- Family: Cicurinidae
- Genus: Cicurina
- Species: C. cicur

Binomial name
- Cicurina cicur (Fabricius, 1793)

= Cicurina cicur =

Species of spider

Cicurina cicur is a species of spider found in Europe and Central Asia, first described by Johan Christian Fabricius in 1792. While common in central and eastern Europe, it has not been recorded in Ireland and is on the Red List in Sweden. This species is most commonly found in coniferous and deciduous forests, as well as dark and damp areas, such as leaf litter, caves, drains and cellars, where the spider commonly spins a sheet web.

== Description ==
Both the females and the males of the species range from 5 to 7 mm in size. Their abdomen is light grey-brown or yellow-brown, sometimes with a narrow dark mark, densely covered in hair. Their carapace is smooth and shiny, with its coloration being a yellow-brown to a reddish brown. Their legs are a similar coloration.
