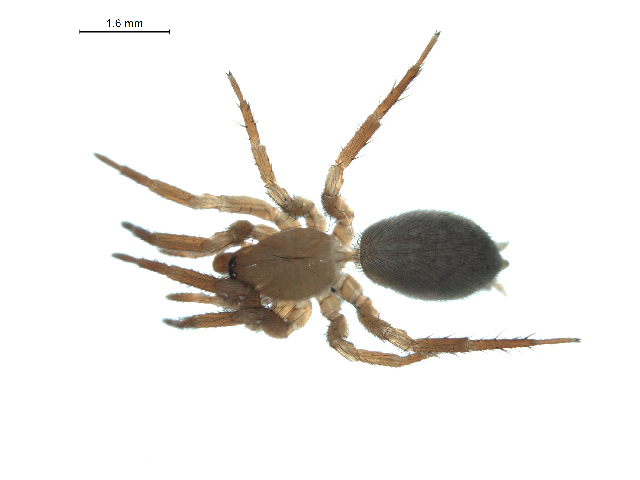
- C. intermedia, adult female

Conservation status
- Secure (NatureServe)

Scientific classification
- Kingdom: Animalia
- Phylum: Arthropoda
- Subphylum: Chelicerata
- Class: Arachnida
- Order: Araneae
- Infraorder: Araneomorphae
- Family: Cicurinidae
- Genus: Cicurina
- Species: C. intermedia

Binomial name
- Cicurina intermedia Chamberlin & Ivie, 1933

= Cicurina intermedia =

Species of spider

Cicurina intermedia is a species of spider in the family Cicurinidae. It is found in the United States.
