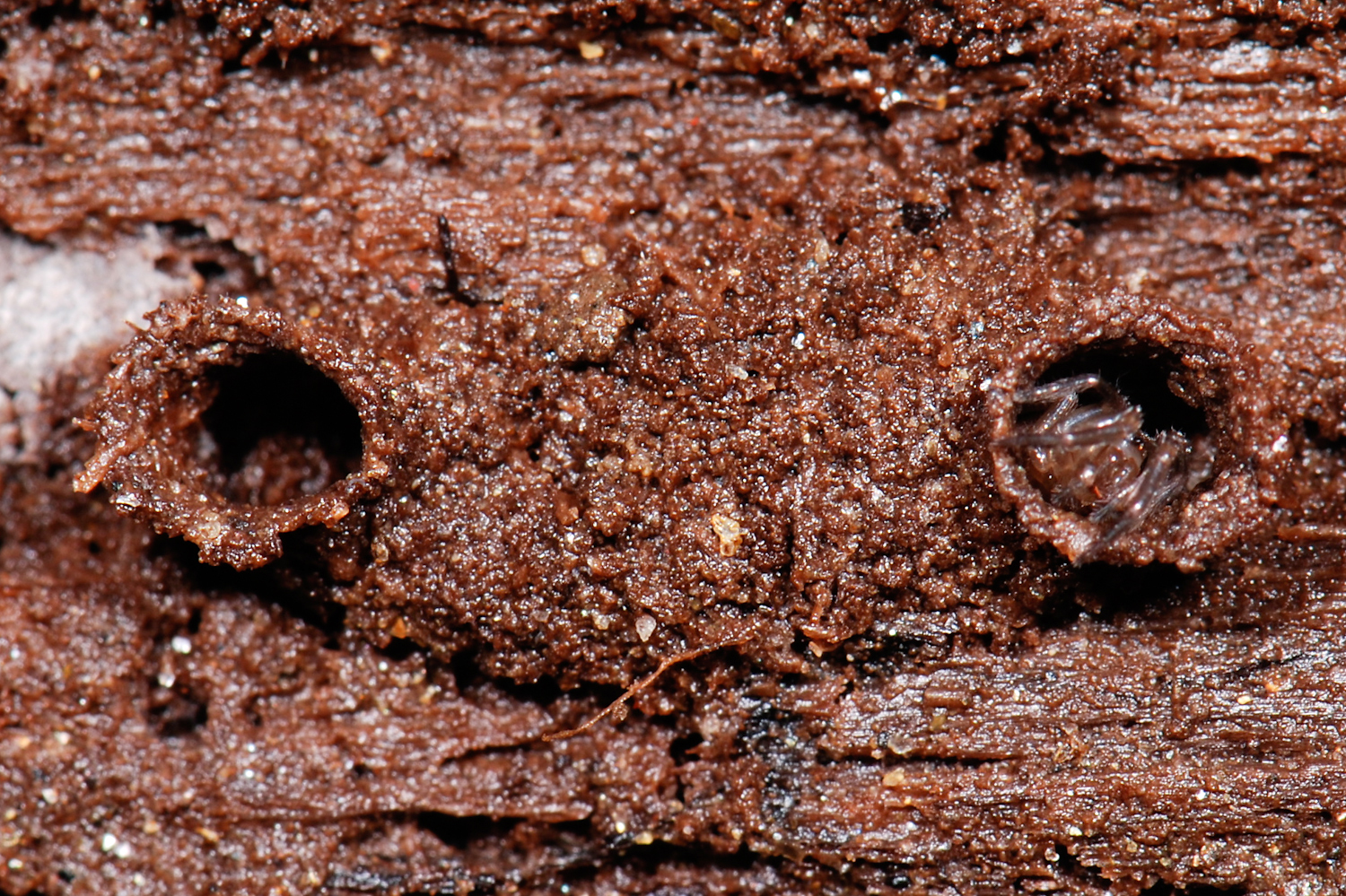
- Cicurina bryantae

Scientific classification
- Kingdom: Animalia
- Phylum: Arthropoda
- Subphylum: Chelicerata
- Class: Arachnida
- Order: Araneae
- Infraorder: Araneomorphae
- Family: Cicurinidae
- Genus: Cicurina
- Species: C. bryantae

Binomial name
- Cicurina bryantae Exline, 1936

= Cicurina bryantae =

Species of spider

Cicurina bryantae is a species of spider in the family Cicurinidae. It is found in the United States.
