= Brommella hellenensis =

Scientific classification
- Kingdom: Animalia
- Phylum: Arthropoda
- Subphylum: Chelicerata
- Class: Arachnida
- Order: Araneae
- Infraorder: Araneomorphae
- Family: Cicurinidae
- Genus: Brommella
- Species: B. hellenensis

Binomial name
- Brommella hellenensis Wunderlich, 1995

Species of spider

Brommella hellenensis is a spider species found in Greece and Czechia.
