= Brommella falcigera =

Scientific classification
- Kingdom: Animalia
- Phylum: Arthropoda
- Subphylum: Chelicerata
- Class: Arachnida
- Order: Araneae
- Infraorder: Araneomorphae
- Family: Cicurinidae
- Genus: Brommella
- Species: B. falcigera

Binomial name
- Brommella falcigera (Balogh, 1935)

Species of spider

Brommella falcigera is a spider species found in Europe.
