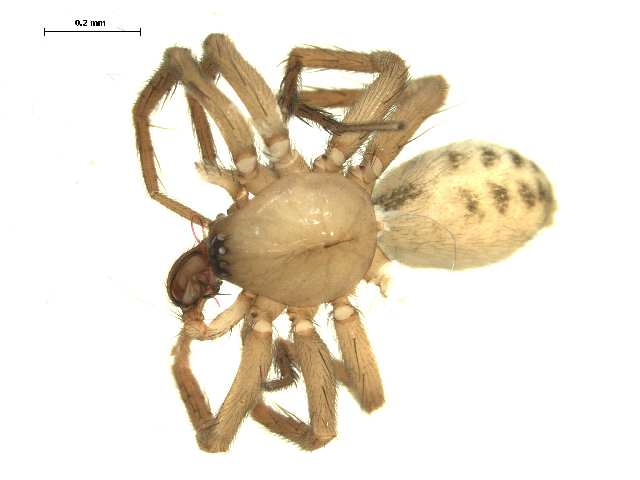
- C. brevis, adult male
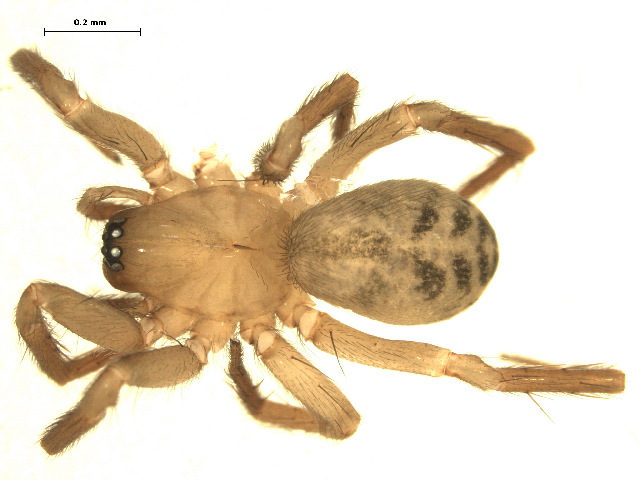
- C. brevis, adult female

Conservation status
- Secure (NatureServe)

Scientific classification
- Kingdom: Animalia
- Phylum: Arthropoda
- Subphylum: Chelicerata
- Class: Arachnida
- Order: Araneae
- Infraorder: Araneomorphae
- Family: Cicurinidae
- Genus: Cicurina
- Species: C. brevis

Binomial name
- Cicurina brevis (Emerton, 1890)

= Cicurina brevis =

Species of spider

Cicurina brevis is a species of araneomorph spider in the family Cicurinidae. It is found in the USA and Canada. A study from 2024 found this species alive under seasonal snowpack in a region called the subnivium in higher concentrations than it was found in the summer time, indicating a potential seasonal specialization for the winter.
