= Cicurina japonica =

Scientific classification
- Kingdom: Animalia
- Phylum: Arthropoda
- Subphylum: Chelicerata
- Class: Arachnida
- Order: Araneae
- Infraorder: Araneomorphae
- Family: Cicurinidae
- Genus: Cicurina
- Species: C. japonica

Binomial name
- Cicurina japonica (Simon, 1886)

Synonyms
- Tetrilus japonicus Simon, 1886

Species of spider

Cicurina japonica is a species of spider in the family Cicurinidae. It can found in Korea and Japan (introduced in Europe).
