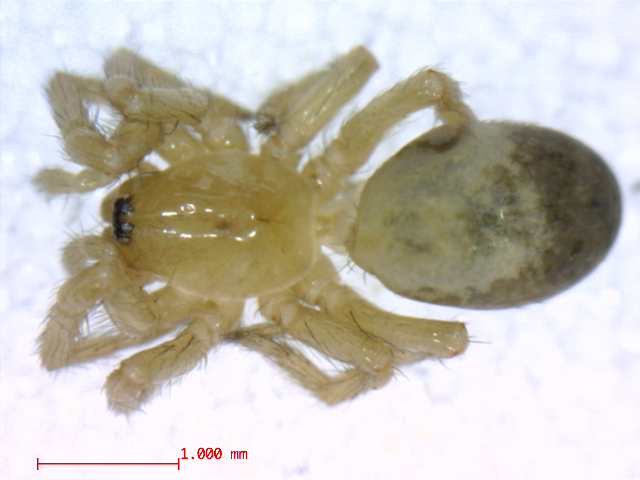
- C. itasca from Ontario, Canada

Conservation status
- Secure (NatureServe)

Scientific classification
- Kingdom: Animalia
- Phylum: Arthropoda
- Subphylum: Chelicerata
- Class: Arachnida
- Order: Araneae
- Infraorder: Araneomorphae
- Family: Cicurinidae
- Genus: Cicurina
- Species: C. itasca

Binomial name
- Cicurina itasca Chamberlin & Ivie, 1940

= Cicurina itasca =

Species of spider

Cicurina itasca is a species of spider in the family Cicurinidae. It can be found in the United States.
