= Altimella =

Scientific classification
- Kingdom: Animalia
- Phylum: Arthropoda
- Subphylum: Chelicerata
- Class: Arachnida
- Order: Araneae
- Infraorder: Araneomorphae
- Family: Cicurinidae
- Genus: Altimella; Wang & Z. S. Zhang, 2024

Type species
- A. nedong Wang & Z. S. Zhang, 2024

Species
- 2, see text

Genus of spiders

Altimella is a genus of spiders in the family Cicurinidae.

This genus is similar to Brommella, which also possesses a cribellum. However, Altimella differs from Brommella by having a longer retrolateral tibial apophysis.

== Distribution ==
Altimella is only known from the Qinghai-Tibet Plateau (Xizang) in China.

== Life style ==
Spiders of this genus have been found in high altitude areas (around 4,000 m) of the Qinghai-Tibet Plateau. They construct sheet webs under stones.

== Etymology ==
The genus name is a combination of Latin "altus" "high", and the suffix -mella from the related genus Brommella. This is an indication of the genus appearing at higher altitudes.

A. nedong is named after the type locality (Xizang, Shannan City, Nedong District, Zedang Town). A. ngamring is also named after type locality (Shigatse City, Ngamring County, Kaga Town, Nanma Village).

== Species ==
As of October 2025, this genus includes two species:

- Altimella nedong Wang & Z. S. Zhang, 2024 – China (type species)
- Altimella ngamring Wang & Z. S. Zhang, 2024 – China
