= Cicurina vespera =

Conservation status
- Critically Imperiled (NatureServe)

- Endangered (ESA)

Scientific classification
- Kingdom: Animalia
- Phylum: Arthropoda
- Subphylum: Chelicerata
- Class: Arachnida
- Order: Araneae
- Infraorder: Araneomorphae
- Family: Cicurinidae
- Genus: Cicurina
- Species: C. vespera

Binomial name
- Cicurina vespera Gertsch, 1992

Species of spider

Cicurina vespera is a rare species of spider in the family Cicurinidae known by the common name Government Canyon Bat Cave meshweaver. It is endemic to Texas in the United States, where it is known from only one cave in Bexar County. This is one of nine invertebrates endemic to the karst caves of Bexar County that were federally listed as endangered species in the year 2000.

Only one specimen of this species was ever collected, a female. The type locality is Government Canyon Bat Cave in the Government Canyon State Natural Area.

The Bexar County karst cave invertebrates are troglobites, species that spend their entire lives in subterranean environments. The threats to all nine species are the same: habitat loss when the caves are filled in or quarried, and habitat degradation via pollution, alterations in water flow, and direct human interference.
