= Cicurina madla =

Conservation status
- Critically Imperiled (NatureServe)

- Endangered (ESA)

Scientific classification
- Kingdom: Animalia
- Phylum: Arthropoda
- Subphylum: Chelicerata
- Class: Arachnida
- Order: Araneae
- Infraorder: Araneomorphae
- Family: Cicurinidae
- Genus: Cicurina
- Species: C. madla

Binomial name
- Cicurina madla Gertsch, 1992

Synonyms
- Cicurina venii Gertsch, 1992

Species of spider

Cicurina madla is a rare species of spider in the family Cicurinidae, known by the common name Madla Cave meshweaver. It is endemic to Texas, United States, where it is known to originate from only eight or nine caves in Bexar County. This is one of a small number of invertebrates endemic to the karst caves of Bexar County that were federally listed as endangered species in the year 2000. Another spider from the caves was described as Cicurina venii, and given the common name Braken Bat Cave meshweaver. In 2018, it was synonymized with C. madla.

== Description ==
Cicurina madla has no functional eyes. Females are cream-colored, with a body length of 4.8–6.7 mm, made up of a cephalothorax 2.3–3.3 mm long and 1.5–2.3 mm wide and an abdomen 2.5–3.4 mm long and 1.5–2.1 mm wide. The fourth leg has the longest femur, 2.5–3.4 mm long. The spermathecae are elongated. Males have a palpal bulb with a relatively narrow, elongated cymbium and an oblong tegulum.

Cokendolpher in 2004 constructed a "troglomorphy index" (TI) defined as the ratio of the sum of the lengths of the femur, patella and tibia of the first leg to the length of the cephalothorax. Higher values of the index indicate relatively longer legs and are associated with a troglodytic life-style. C. madla, including the specimen described as C. venii, produced ratios above 2.0, except for small immatures. C. madla can be distinguished from Cicurina species occurring in the same area by its TI index, as well as by genetic data and the structure of the female spermatheca or the male palpal bulb.

== Taxonomy ==
Cicurina madla was first described by Willis J. Gertsch in 1992. In the same paper, Gertsch described a spider as Cicurina venii, giving its sole location as Braken Bat Cave (not the same cave as Bracken Cave in Comal County, Texas). Only two specimens assigned to C. venii were ever collected, but one is now lost. The entrance to Braken Bat Cave has been filled in, and the cave cannot currently be accessed. It is located on private property. A study of Cicurina spiders from Texas caves in 2018 concluded that the sole known specimen of C. venii belongs to the same species as C. madla, and synonymized them. The authors of the study suggested that either the specimen described as C. venii was in fact from Government Canyon Bat Cave, but was mislabeled or placed into an incorrect vial, or it was from Braken Bat Cave, and so represents a further southern extension of the range of C. madla. The synonymy is accepted by the World Spider Catalog.

== Ecology and conservation ==
The Bexar County karst cave invertebrates are troglobites, species that spend their entire lives in subterranean environments. The current status of the invertebrates is difficult to assess because their habitats are largely inaccessible and the animals themselves are small and cryptic. The threats to all species are the same: habitat loss when the caves are filled in or quarried, and habitat degradation via pollution, alterations in water flow, and direct human interference. Some caves are infested with the red imported fire ant.

In August 2012, a spider assigned to this species was found in a 6-foot-deep natural hole in Northwest San Antonio, halting completion of a $15-million highway underpass. Biologists have identified at least 19 cave features in the area, at least five of which could contain more.
