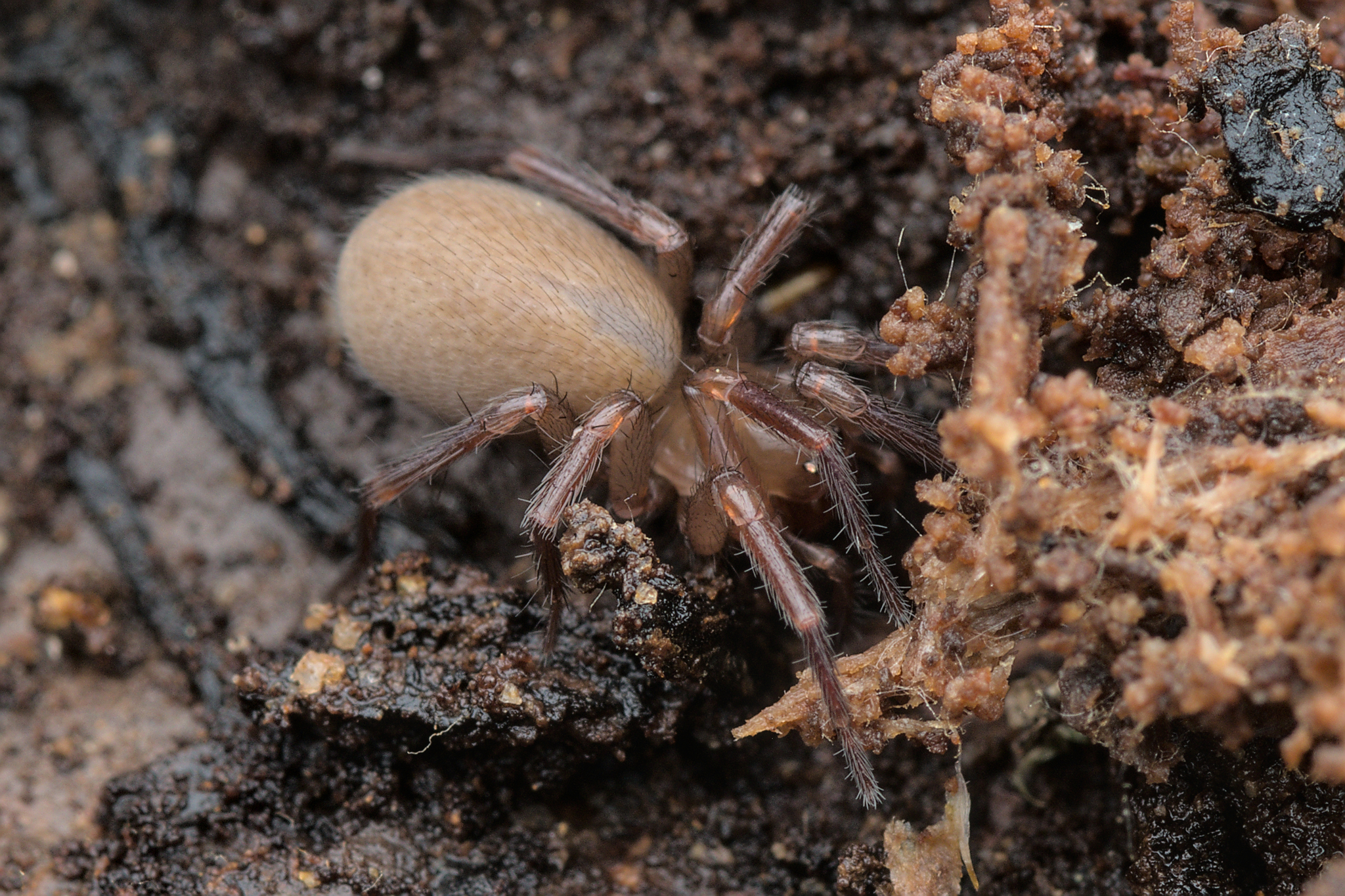
- C. cicur from France
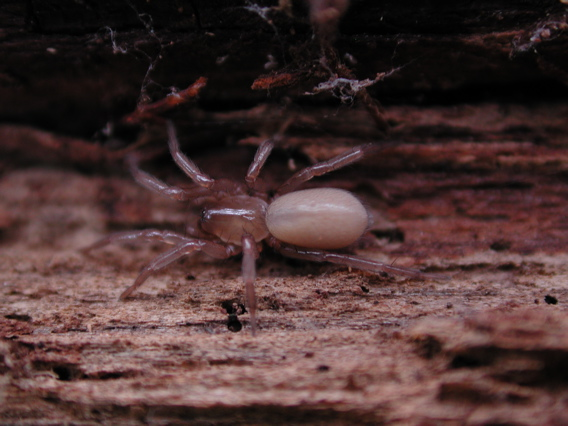
- Cicurina sp. from the "sky island" mountains of Arizona and New Mexico

Scientific classification
- Kingdom: Animalia
- Phylum: Arthropoda
- Subphylum: Chelicerata
- Class: Arachnida
- Order: Araneae
- Infraorder: Araneomorphae
- Family: Cicurinidae
- Genus: Cicurina; Menge, 1871

Type species
- C. cicur (Fabricius, 1793)

Species
- 158, see text

Synonyms
- Moguracicurina Komatsu, 1947; Tetrilus Simon, 1886

= Cicurina =

Genus of spiders

Cicurina, also called the cave meshweaver, is a genus in the spider family Cicurinidae. It was first described by Anton Menge in 1871. The name is from the Latin root "cucur-", meaning "to tame".

Originally placed with the funnel weavers, it was moved to the Dictynidae in 1967, then to the Hahniidae in 2017. In 2023, it was moved to the Cicurinidae.

Body size varies widely among the species. Among the smallest is C. minorata, growing less than 2 millimetres (0.079 in) long. The larger species include C. ludoviciana, some of which have grown to over 13 millimetres (0.51 in) long.

== Distribution ==
Spiders in this genus are found in North America, Europe, and Asia.

== Species ==
As of October 2025, this genus includes 158 species.

These species have articles on Wikipedia:

- Cicurina arcuata Keyserling, 1887 – Canada, United States
- Cicurina baronia Gertsch, 1992 – United States
- Cicurina brevis (Emerton, 1890) – Canada, United States
- Cicurina bryantae Exline, 1936 – United States
- Cicurina cicur (Fabricius, 1793) – Europe to Central Asia (type species)
- Cicurina intermedia Chamberlin & Ivie, 1933 – Canada, United States
- Cicurina itasca Chamberlin & Ivie, 1940 – Canada, United States
- Cicurina japonica (Simon, 1886) – Korea, Japan. Introduced to Europe
- Cicurina madla Gertsch, 1992 – United States
- Cicurina pallida Keyserling, 1887 – Canada, United States
- Cicurina pusilla (Simon, 1886) – Alaska, United States
- Cicurina robusta Simon, 1886 – Canada, United States
- Cicurina simplex Simon, 1886 – Alaska, Canada, United States
- Cicurina tersa Simon, 1886 – Canada, United States
- Cicurina vespera Gertsch, 1992 – United States

Complete species list as of October 2025
- Cicurina aenigma Gertsch, 1992 – United States
- Cicurina alpicora Barrows, 1945 – United States
- Cicurina anhuiensis Chen, 1986 – China
- Cicurina arcata Chamberlin & Ivie, 1940 – United States
- Cicurina arcuata Keyserling, 1887 – Canada, United States
- Cicurina arizona Chamberlin & Ivie, 1940 – United States
- Cicurina arkansa Gertsch, 1992 – United States
- Cicurina armadillo Gertsch, 1992 – United States
- Cicurina atomaria Simon, 1898 – United States
- Cicurina auster Okumura & Ono, 2025 – Japan
- Cicurina avicularia Li, 2017 – China
- Cicurina bandera Gertsch, 1992 – United States
- Cicurina bandida Gertsch, 1992 – United States
- Cicurina baronia Gertsch, 1992 – United States
- Cicurina barri Gertsch, 1992 – United States
- Cicurina bifurca Liao & Xu, 2022 – China
- Cicurina blanco Gertsch, 1992 – United States
- Cicurina breviaria Bishop & Crosby, 1926 – United States
- Cicurina brevis (Emerton, 1890) – Canada, United States
- Cicurina browni Gertsch, 1992 – United States
- Cicurina brunsi Cokendolpher, 2004 – United States
- Cicurina bryantae Exline, 1936 – United States
- Cicurina bullis Cokendolpher, 2004 – United States
- Cicurina buwata Chamberlin & Ivie, 1940 – United States
- Cicurina caliga Cokendolpher & Reddell, 2001 – United States
- Cicurina calyciforma Wang & Xu, 1989 – China
- Cicurina cavealis Bishop & Crosby, 1926 – United States
- Cicurina caverna Gertsch, 1992 – United States
- Cicurina chengkou Wang, Mu, Yang & Zhang, 2024 – China
- Cicurina cicur (Fabricius, 1793) – Europe to Central Asia (type species)
- Cicurina coahuila Gertsch, 1971 – Mexico
- Cicurina colorada Chamberlin & Ivie, 1940 – United States
- Cicurina coryelli Gertsch, 1992 – United States
- Cicurina dabashan Wang, Mu, Yang & Zhang, 2024 – China
- Cicurina damaoensis Li, 2017 – China
- Cicurina davisi Exline, 1936 – United States
- Cicurina daweishanensis Wang, Zhou & Peng, 2019 – China
- Cicurina delrio Gertsch, 1992 – United States
- Cicurina deserticola Chamberlin & Ivie, 1940 – United States
- Cicurina dong Li, 2017 – China
- Cicurina dorothea Gertsch, 1992 – United States
- Cicurina eburnata Wang, 1994 – China
- Cicurina ezelli Gertsch, 1992 – United States
- Cicurina gertschi Exline, 1936 – United States
- Cicurina gruta Gertsch, 1992 – United States
- Cicurina guanshan Wang & Zhang, 2025 – China
- Cicurina harrietae Gertsch, 1992 – United States
- Cicurina hexops Chamberlin & Ivie, 1940 – United States
- Cicurina holsingeri Gertsch, 1992 – United States
- Cicurina hoodensis Cokendolpher & Reddell, 2001 – United States
- Cicurina hoshinonoana Shimojana & Ono, 2017 – Japan
- Cicurina idahoana Chamberlin, 1919 – Canada, United States
- Cicurina intermedia Chamberlin & Ivie, 1933 – Canada, United States
- Cicurina itasca Chamberlin & Ivie, 1940 – Canada, United States
- Cicurina iviei Gertsch, 1971 – Mexico
- Cicurina japonica (Simon, 1886) – Korea, Japan. Introduced to Europe
- Cicurina jiangyongensis Peng, Gong & Kim, 1996 – China
- Cicurina jinyun Chen, Wang, Z.-S. Zhang & F. Zhang, 2025 – China
- Cicurina jonesi Chamberlin & Ivie, 1940 – United States
- Cicurina joya Gertsch, 1992 – United States
- Cicurina kailiensis Li, 2017 – China
- Cicurina kekei Wang, Zhou & Peng, 2019 – China
- Cicurina kimyongkii Paik, 1970 – Korea
- Cicurina leona Gertsch, 1992 – Mexico
- Cicurina lichuanensis Wang, Zhou & Peng, 2019 – China
- Cicurina linkouzi Wang & Zhang, 2025 – China
- Cicurina longihamata Wang, Mu, Yang & Zhang, 2024 – China
- Cicurina ludoviciana Simon, 1898 – United States
- Cicurina machete Gertsch, 1992 – United States
- Cicurina maculifera Yaginuma, 1979 – Japan
- Cicurina maculipes Saito, 1934 – Japan
- Cicurina madla Gertsch, 1992 – United States
- Cicurina majiangensis Li, 2017 – China
- Cicurina marmorea Gertsch, 1992 – United States
- Cicurina maya Gertsch, 1977 – Mexico
- Cicurina mckenziei Gertsch, 1992 – United States
- Cicurina medina Gertsch, 1992 – United States
- Cicurina menardia Gertsch, 1992 – United States
- Cicurina microps Chamberlin & Ivie, 1940 – United States
- Cicurina mina Gertsch, 1971 – Mexico
- Cicurina miniae Lin & Li, 2023 – Vietnam
- Cicurina minima Chamberlin & Ivie, 1940 – Canada, United States
- Cicurina minnesota Chamberlin & Ivie, 1940 – Canada, United States
- Cicurina minorata (Gertsch & Davis, 1936) – United States
- Cicurina minuta Wang & Zhang, 2025 – China
- Cicurina mirifica Gertsch, 1992 – United States
- Cicurina mixmaster Cokendolpher & Reddell, 2001 – United States
- Cicurina modesta Gertsch, 1992 – United States
- Cicurina neovespera Cokendolpher, 2004 – United States
- Cicurina nervifera Yin, 2012 – China
- Cicurina nevadensis Simon, 1886 – United States
- Cicurina obscura Gertsch, 1992 – United States
- Cicurina oklahoma Gertsch, 1992 – United States
- Cicurina orellia Gertsch, 1992 – United States
- Cicurina pablo Gertsch, 1992 – United States
- Cicurina pacifica Chamberlin & Ivie, 1940 – United States
- Cicurina pagosa Chamberlin & Ivie, 1940 – United States
- Cicurina pallida Keyserling, 1887 – Canada, United States
- Cicurina pampa Chamberlin & Ivie, 1940 – United States
- Cicurina paphlagoniae Brignoli, 1978 – Turkey
- Cicurina parallela Li, 2017 – China
- Cicurina parma Chamberlin & Ivie, 1940 – United States
- Cicurina pastura Gertsch, 1992 – United States
- Cicurina patei Gertsch, 1992 – United States
- Cicurina peckhami (Simon, 1898) – Canada, United States
- Cicurina phaselus Paik, 1970 – Korea
- Cicurina placida Banks, 1892 – Canada, United States
- Cicurina platypus Cokendolpher, 2004 – United States
- Cicurina porteri Gertsch, 1992 – United States
- Cicurina puentecilla Gertsch, 1992 – United States
- Cicurina pusilla (Simon, 1886) – Alaska, United States
- Cicurina rainesi Gertsch, 1992 – United States
- Cicurina reclusa Gertsch, 1992 – United States
- Cicurina riogrande Gertsch & Mulaik, 1940 – United States
- Cicurina robusta Simon, 1886 – Canada, United States
- Cicurina rosae Gertsch, 1992 – United States
- Cicurina rudimentops Chamberlin & Ivie, 1940 – United States
- Cicurina russelli Gertsch, 1992 – United States
- Cicurina sansaba Gertsch, 1992 – United States
- Cicurina secreta Gertsch, 1992 – United States
- Cicurina selecta Gertsch, 1992 – United States
- Cicurina serena Gertsch, 1992 – United States
- Cicurina shasta Chamberlin & Ivie, 1940 – United States
- Cicurina sheari Gertsch, 1992 – United States
- Cicurina shuangyang Wang & Zhang, 2025 – China
- Cicurina sierra Chamberlin & Ivie, 1940 – United States
- Cicurina simplex Simon, 1886 – Alaska, Canada, United States
- Cicurina sintonia Gertsch, 1992 – United States
- Cicurina spiralis Liao & Xu, 2022 – China
- Cicurina sprousei Gertsch, 1992 – United States
- Cicurina stowersi Gertsch, 1992 – United States
- Cicurina suttoni Gertsch, 1992 – United States
- Cicurina tacoma Chamberlin & Ivie, 1940 – United States
- Cicurina tersa Simon, 1886 – Canada, United States
- Cicurina tetragongylodes Liao & Xu, 2022 – China
- Cicurina texana (Gertsch, 1935) – United States
- Cicurina tianmuensis Song & Kim, 1991 – China
- Cicurina tortuba Chamberlin & Ivie, 1940 – United States
- Cicurina travisae Gertsch, 1992 – United States
- Cicurina troglobia Cokendolpher, 2004 – United States
- Cicurina troglodytes Yaginuma, 1972 – Japan
- Cicurina ubicki Gertsch, 1992 – United States
- Cicurina utahana Chamberlin, 1919 – United States
- Cicurina uvalde Gertsch, 1992 – United States
- Cicurina varians Gertsch & Mulaik, 1940 – Canada, United States
- Cicurina venefica Gertsch, 1992 – United States
- Cicurina vespera Gertsch, 1992 – United States
- Cicurina vibora Gertsch, 1992 – United States
- Cicurina watersi Gertsch, 1992 – United States
- Cicurina wiltoni Gertsch, 1992 – United States
- Cicurina wusanani Li, 2017 – China
- Cicurina wuxi Wang & Zhang, 2025 – China
- Cicurina yangi Wang & Zhang, 2025 – China
- Cicurina yinhe Chen, Wang, Z.-S. Zhang & F. Zhang, 2025 – China
- Cicurina yintiaoling Wang & Zhang, 2025 – China
- Cicurina yuelushanensis Wang, Zhou & Peng, 2019 – China
- Cicurina zhangfui Chen, Wang, Z.-S. Zhang & F. Zhang, 2025 – China
- Cicurina zhazuweii Li, 2017 – China
