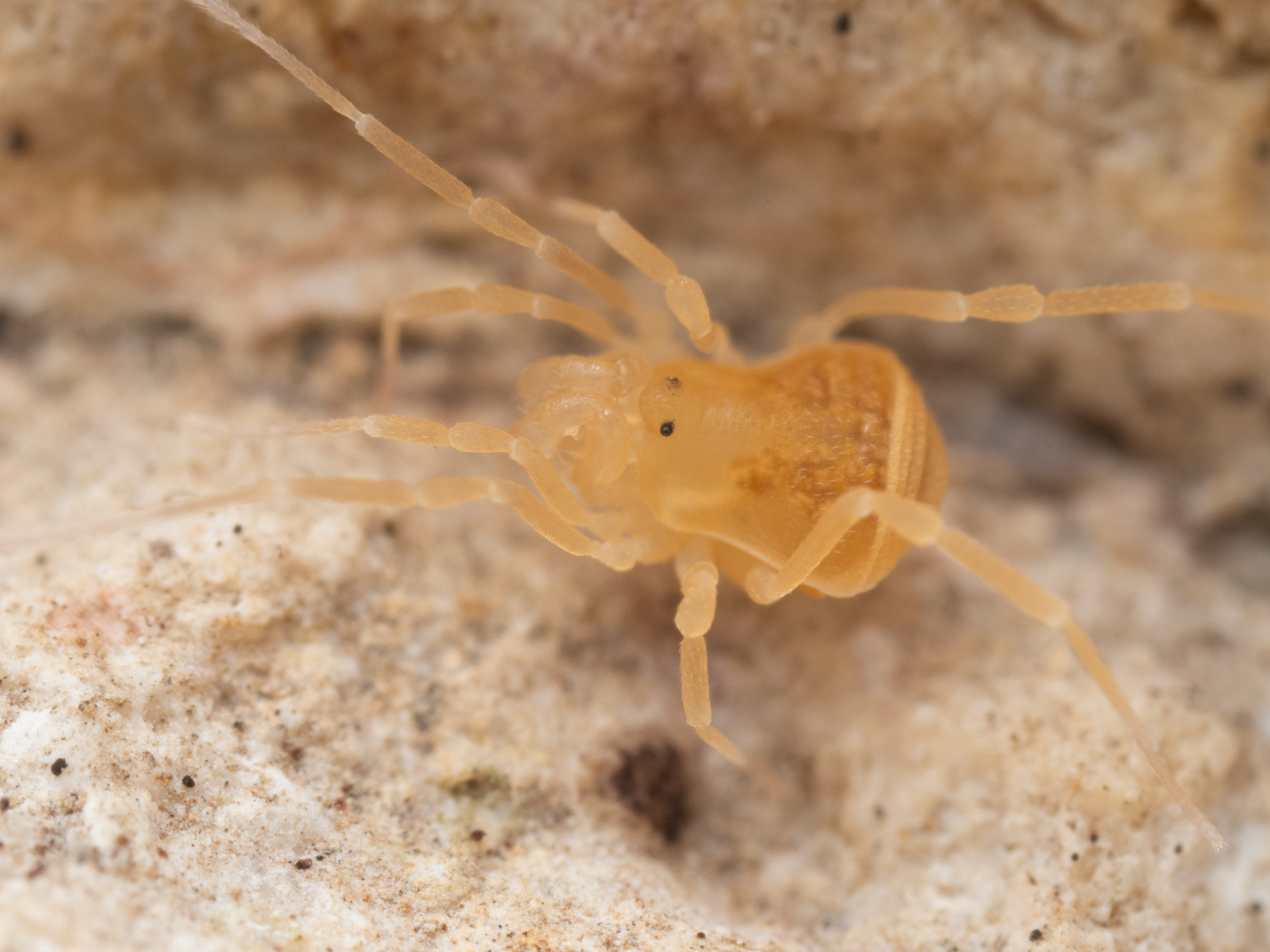

Conservation status
- Endangered (ESA)

- Imperiled (NatureServe)

Scientific classification
- Domain: Eukaryota
- Kingdom: Animalia
- Phylum: Arthropoda
- Subphylum: Chelicerata
- Class: Arachnida
- Order: Opiliones
- Family: Phalangodidae
- Genus: Texella
- Species: T. reddelli

Binomial name
- Texella reddelli Goodnight & Goodnight, 1967

= Texella reddelli =

Species of harvestman/daddy longlegs

Texella reddelli, the Bee Creek cave harvestman, is a rare species of troglobitic harvestman that was added to the United States endangered species list in 1988, at the same time as six other species native to the karst ecosystem in Travis County and Williamson County, Texas, USA. They inhabit areas with near 100% humidity and constant temperatures, and they prey on springtails. Research on these creatures has been difficult since they can only be found underground. Their distribution is limited and unknown reproductive rates mean that it is possible they are especially susceptible to habitat destruction and other threats. Texella reddelli are found on both the North and South sides of the Colorado River.

== Description ==
These arachnids are about 1/8 of an inch (3.175 mm) long with a yellow-brown color and long legs. Juveniles have a yellowish-white body. They live underground, and have small eyes, and elongated appendages. All seven species live in the Karst ecosystem in Travis and Williamson counties in Texas.

== Habitat ==
Bee Creek cave harvestman inhabit limestone caves. They are only able to survive in caves that maintain stable temperatures and humidity (close to 100%). They have been found in caves both on the north and south side of the Colorado river. They live in the karst terrain in Travis County, which is formed by "dissolution of calcium carbonate from limestone bedrock by mildly acidic groundwater." This process creates the caves that are needed to support this species. They receive their nutrients through groundwater infiltration.

== Troglobites ==
Texella reddelli is a type of troglobite. These species survived in the cave environment and adapted to it. The Karst terrain created caves that were not always connected with each other. This brought about "islands" of individual populations that were disconnected for long periods of time. Over time the separate groups became different species because of the isolation. The rate at which each population speciated was different. The species that are more mobile have larger ranges and are less isolated. Since they are all still relatively close together, disturbances can make them highly susceptible to extinction. They require stable temperatures and often stay in remote corners or the ceiling of the cave that are the warmest.

== Location ==
Since 1988 when these species were first listed as endangered, other caves containing these species have been discovered, along with new endemic species. Due to the intensive requirements to find caves, much of the karst area has not been searched. To date, over 700 karst features have been located in two counties in Texas, while only 100 of these are believed to contain endangered species. While the number of locations in which these endangered species are found may increase, the total range of each species is not expected to grow.

Texella reyesi was considered T. reddelli because of their similarities, but it has since been identified as different and now is also on the endangered species list. Texella reddelli is known from only three caves in the Jollyville plateau and four caves in the Rollingwood region. Those that were originally thought to be T. reddelli, but now are renamed Texella reyesi occur in Tooth, McDonald, Weldon, and Root caves, also in Texas.

== Karst ==
The karst ecosystem in Texas is provided water by surface drainage and groundwater. The water travels rapidly through cave openings and fractures. This provides very little or no purification, which can leave the cave susceptible to pollution from contaminated water. This is a problem in certain areas where runoff can be a problem or in agricultural areas where herbicides and pesticides are used. Contaminants are one of the main threats to these species, along with urban development.

In a karst ecosystem the surface communities are very important for photosynthesis. These plant and animal communities are essential for nutrients and energy. Nutrients travel from the surface in the form of organic debris. The surface plant communities around this ecosystem can range from pasture land to woodlands. Exotic plants and animals are detrimental to native species because they compete for food and decrease overall species diversity. The surface community also serves as a buffer against temperature and moisture change and can filter out some pollutants.

== Threats ==
The area in which the species occur is going through urban expansion at a rapid rate. Very few of the caves are capable of handling a change and many of the caves already occur close to developed areas, such as roads, schools, houses, golf courses, and commercial centers. Changes in drainage patterns along with increases in pollution could cause a collapse of caves. Although some caves have already been filled or collapsed, it is hard to estimate how many have already been lost. Elliott and Reddell (1989) estimate that 10% of caves in Travis County are destroyed every 10 years. Development activities that result in the alteration of natural drainage patterns can negatively affect these species. This can include altering the topography, increasing or decreasing cover, irrigation systems, and other activities.

Fire ants are especially detrimental to the Karst ecosystem, although the main threat to the species is loss of habitat to urban development. The fire ant is an aggressive predator and it has devastating and long lasting impacts on native ant and arthropod communities. The shallow caves makes Texella reddelli vulnerable to invasion by fire ants and other exotic species. Fire ants have been found in over 50% of the caves that are known to contain endangered species in this ecosystem. Even if the fire ants do not always directly prey upon the Texella reddelli, their presence can have a negative effect on the ecosystem and species that are critical in the food chain.

== Recovery ==
The future of these several species depends on the protection of key areas of the Karst ecosystem. Areas that are chosen should not be close together in case of a disaster and in order to protect the maximum genetic diversity. The troglobites require protection from contaminated ground water and other non-native predators such as fire ants.

== See also ==
- Kretschmarr Cave mold beetle
- Tooth Cave pseudoscorpion
- Tooth cave spider
- List of troglobites
