= Texella bifurcata =

Scientific classification
- Kingdom: Animalia
- Phylum: Arthropoda
- Subphylum: Chelicerata
- Class: Arachnida
- Order: Opiliones
- Family: Phalangodidae
- Genus: Texella
- Species: T. bifurcata

Binomial name
- Texella bifurcata (Briggs, 1968)

Species of harvestman/daddy longlegs

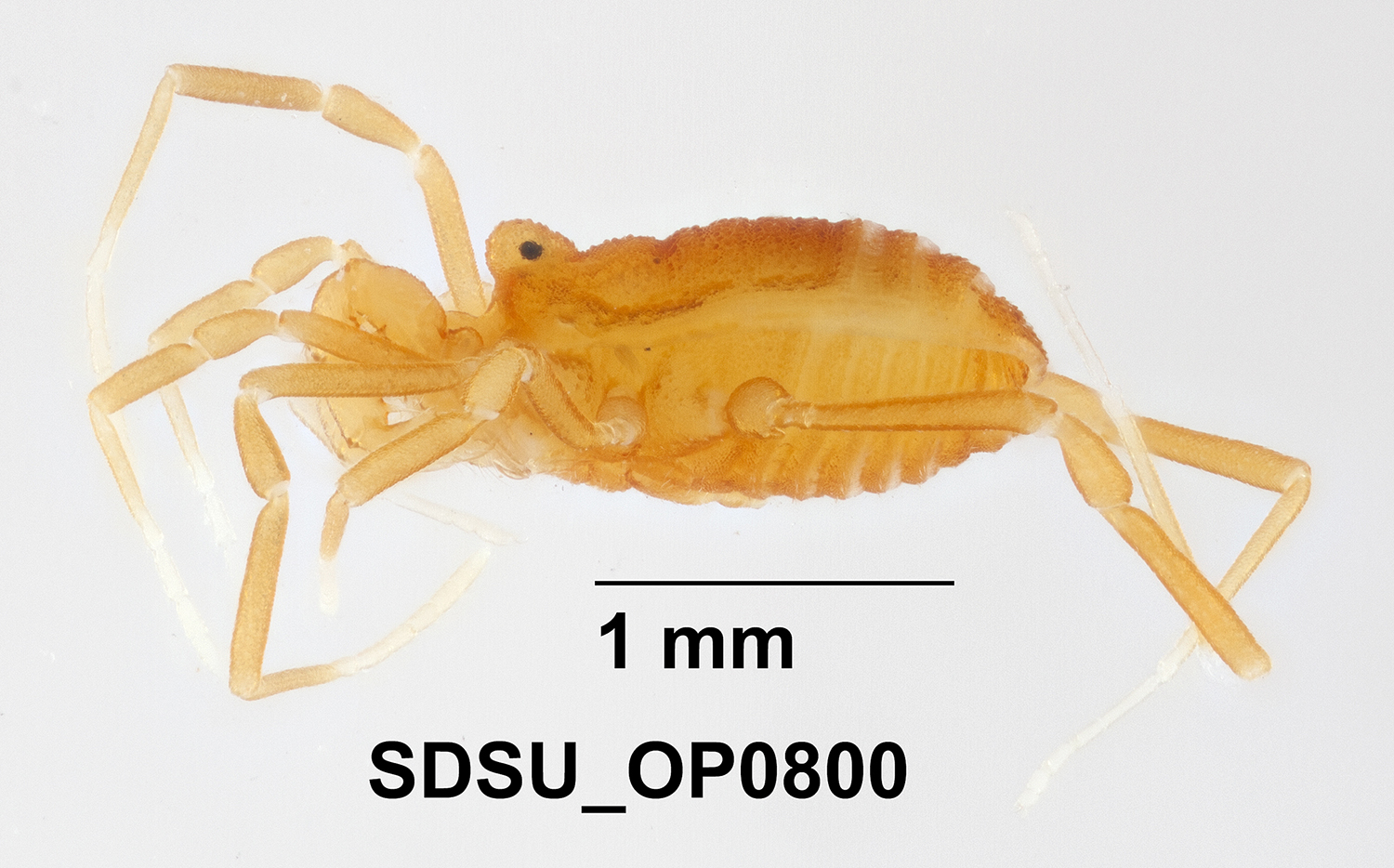
Texella bifurcata (Briggs, 1968) (SDSU OP0800) 002

Texella bifurcata is a species of armoured harvestman in the family Phalangodidae. It is found in North America.
