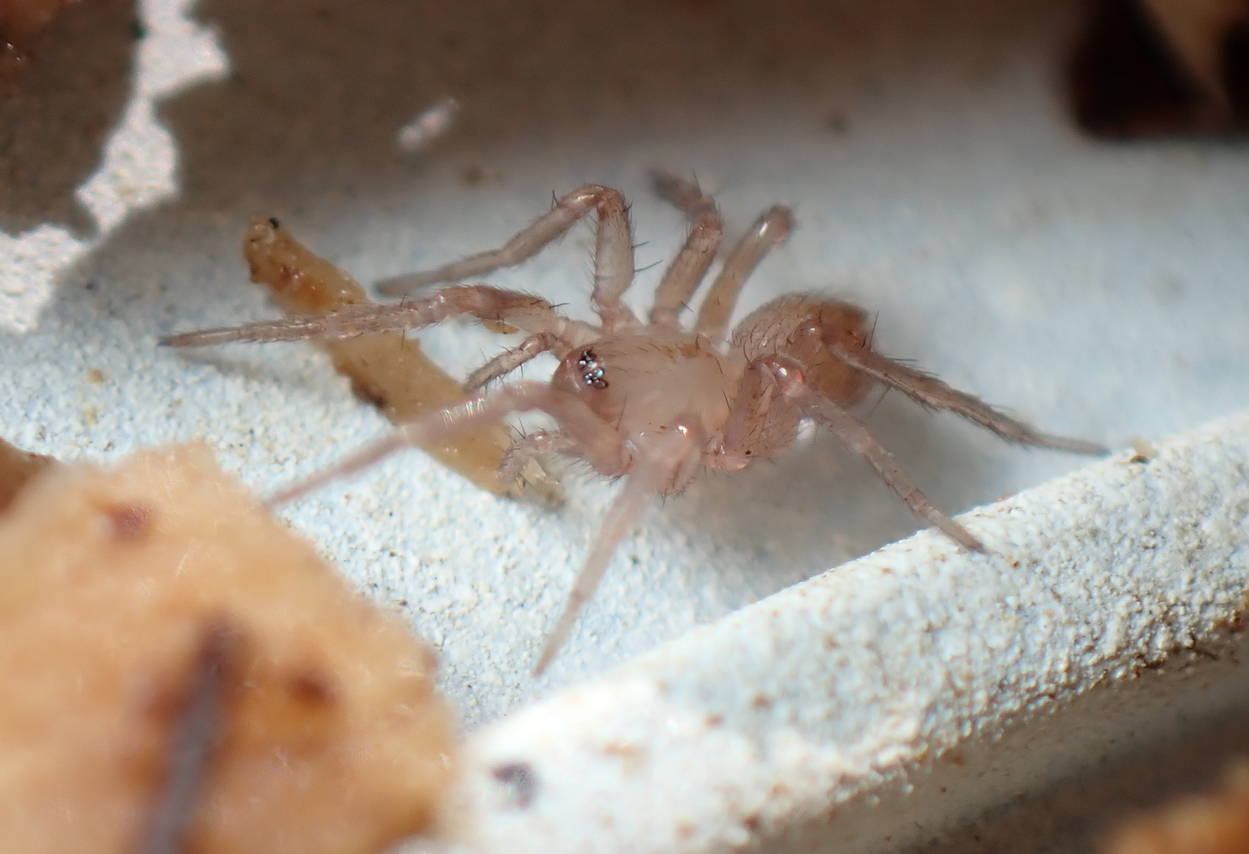
- C. subterraneum

Scientific classification
- Kingdom: Animalia
- Phylum: Arthropoda
- Subphylum: Chelicerata
- Class: Arachnida
- Order: Araneae
- Infraorder: Araneomorphae
- Family: Cicurinidae
- Genus: Chorizomma; Simon, 1872
- Species: C. subterraneum

Binomial name
- Chorizomma subterraneum Simon, 1872

= Chorizomma =

Genus of spiders

Chorizomma is a monotypic genus of European dwarf sheet spiders containing the single species, Chorizomma subterraneum. It was first described by Eugène Simon in 1872, and has only been found in Spain and France. Originally placed with the funnel weavers, it was moved to the Dictynidae in 1967, and to the Hahniidae in 2017. In 2023, it was moved to the Cicurinidae.
