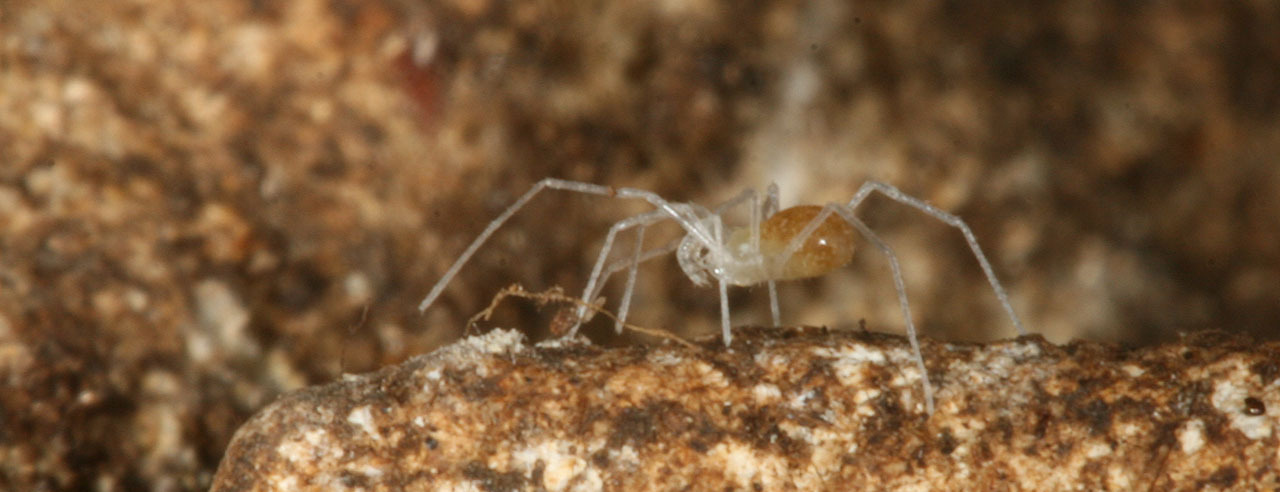
- Bone Cave Harvestman (freshly molted) from Gallifer Cave, Travis County, TX

Conservation status
- Endangered (ESA)

- Imperiled (NatureServe)

Scientific classification
- Kingdom: Animalia
- Phylum: Arthropoda
- Subphylum: Chelicerata
- Class: Arachnida
- Order: Opiliones
- Family: Phalangodidae
- Genus: Texella
- Species: T. reyesi

Binomial name
- Texella reyesi Ubick and Briggs, 1992

= Texella reyesi =

Species of harvestman/daddy longlegs

Texella reyesi is a rare species of arachnid known by the common name Bone Cave harvestman, or Daddy Long Legs . It is endemic to Texas in the United States, where it lives in limestone caves in Travis and Williamson Counties. It is threatened by the loss of its habitat. It is a federally listed endangered species of the United States.

Specimens of this harvestman were once included as members of Texella reddelli, and the two species are closely related. This harvestman was described as a new species in 1992.

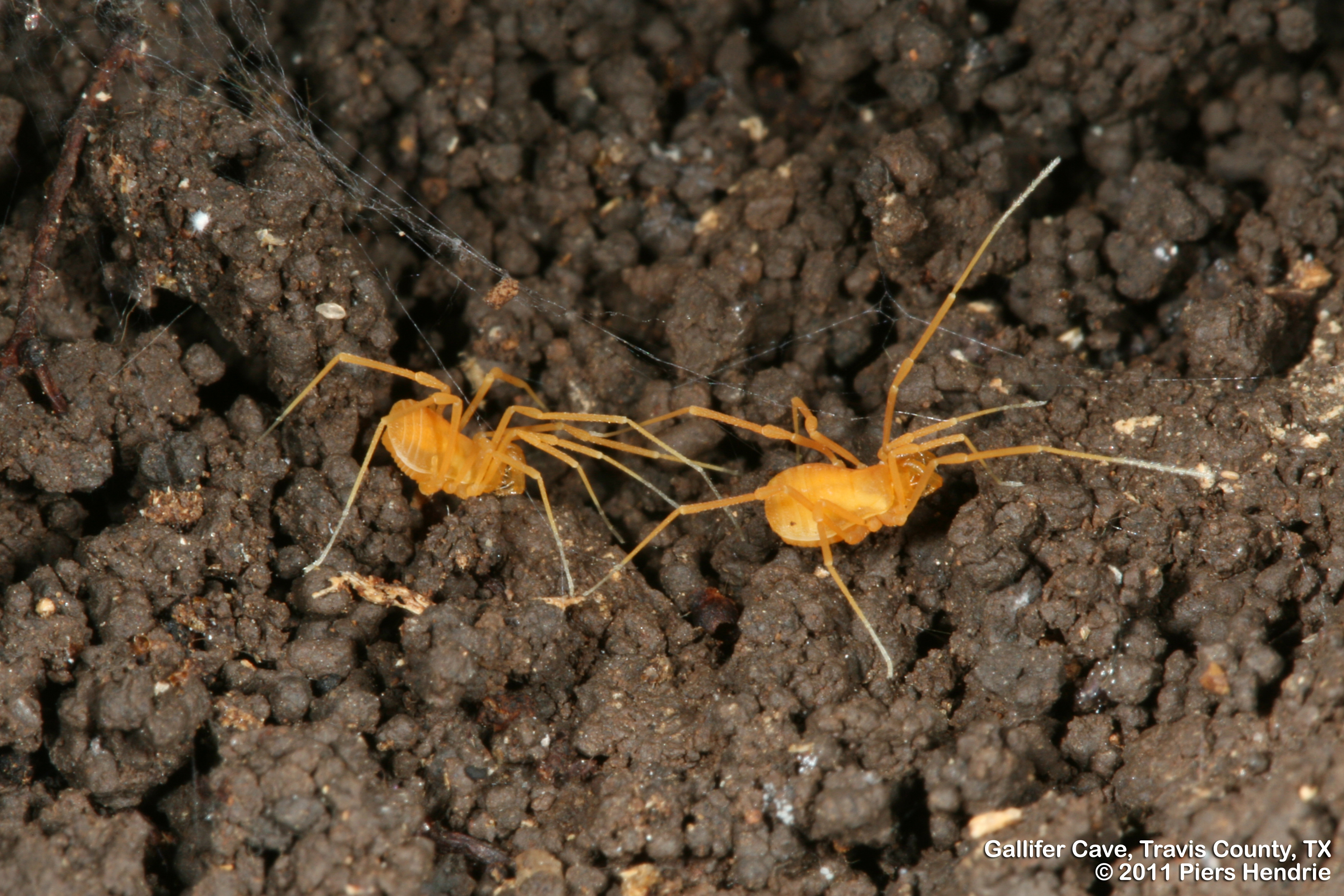
Texella reyesi pair from Gallifer Cave, Travis County, TX

This harvestman is eyeless and pale orange in color. It is 1.4 to 2.7 millimeters long and has long legs. The lack of eyes and body pigment and the long legs are adaptations for life as a troglobite, an animal which spends its whole life in dark caves. It consumes invertebrates. It is sensitive to humidity and cannot tolerate dry conditions. During dry times it seeks the most moist corners of its cave environment.

This animal is known from 168 karst caves on the Edwards Plateau of Texas. This and other species that live in these cave networks are threatened by a number of processes. The worst threat is the outright loss of its cave habitat, which is destroyed as the land is consumed for urban development. Caves are also altered and polluted so that they cannot support this and other species.

== Controversy ==
A Texas rancher, John Yearwood, and others filed a lawsuit against the U.S. Fish and Wildlife Service to have the Bone Cave harvestman delisted from the endangered list. The arachnids are found on his property and he said their presence and their status is preventing him from developing the land.
