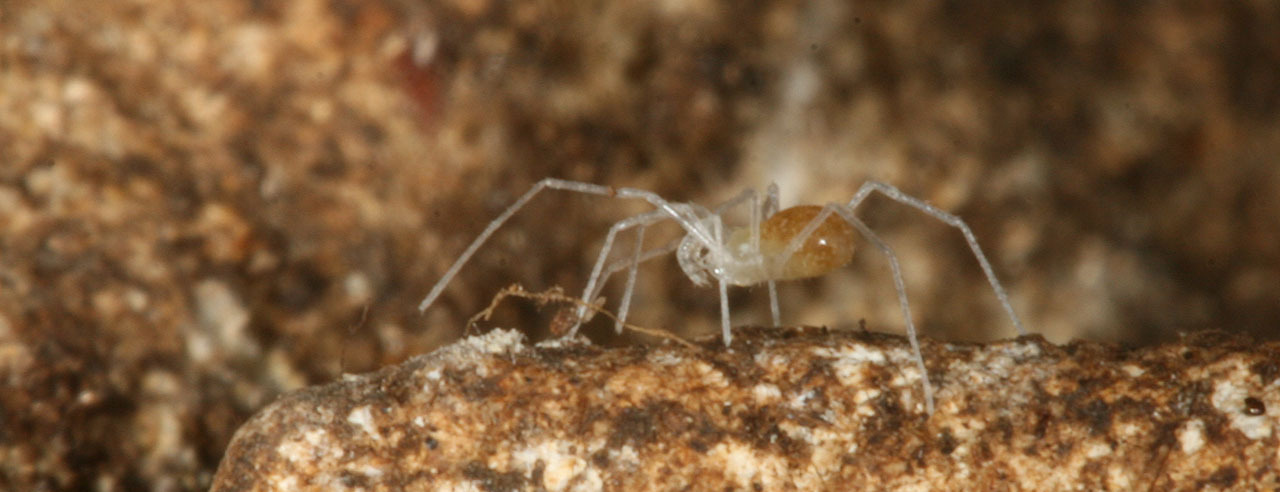
- Texella reyesi

Scientific classification
- Kingdom: Animalia
- Phylum: Arthropoda
- Subphylum: Chelicerata
- Class: Arachnida
- Order: Opiliones
- Family: Phalangodidae
- Genus: Texella; C.J. Goodnight & M.L. Goodnight, 1942

= Texella =

Genus of harvestmen/daddy longlegs

Texella is a genus of armoured harvestmen in the family Phalangodidae. There are more than 20 described species in Texella.

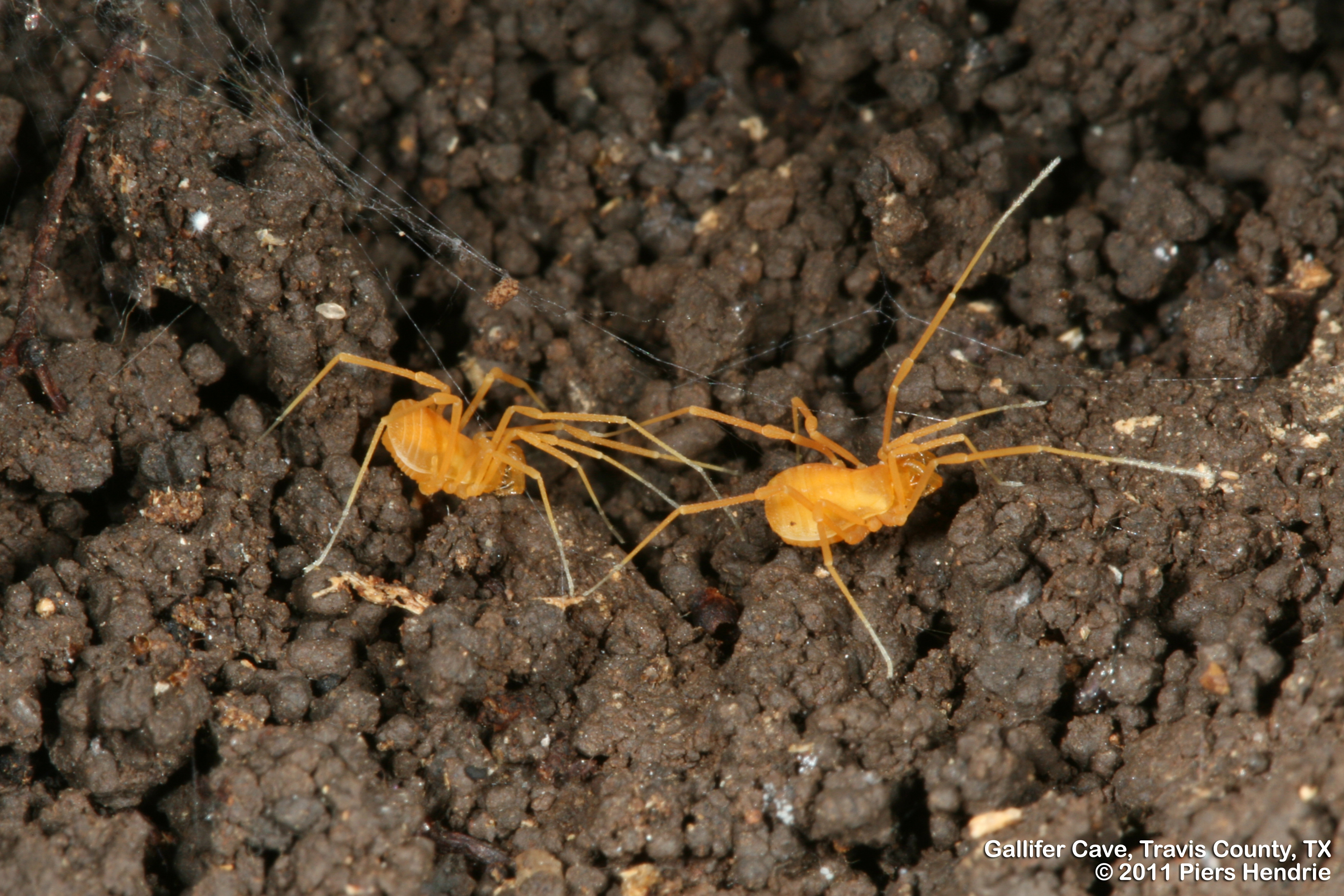
Texella reyesi

== Species ==
These 21 species belong to the genus Texella:

- Texella bifurcata (Briggs, 1968)
- Texella bilobata Ubick & Briggs, 1992
- Texella brevidenta Ubick & Briggs, 1992
- Texella brevistyla Ubick & Briggs, 1992
- Texella cokendolpheri Ubick & Briggs, 1992
- Texella deserticola Ubick & Briggs, 1992
- Texella diplospina Ubick & Briggs, 1992
- Texella fendi Ubick & Briggs, 1992
- Texella grubbsi Ubick & Briggs, 1992
- Texella hardeni Ubick & Briggs, 1992
- Texella homi Ubick & Briggs, 1992
- Texella jungi Ubick & Briggs, 1992
- Texella kokoweef Ubick & Briggs, 1992
- Texella longistyla Ubick & Briggs, 1992
- Texella mulaiki C.J. Goodnight & M.L. Goodnight, 1942
- Texella reddelli C.J. Goodnight & M.L. Goodnight, 1967
- Texella renkesae Ubick & Briggs, 1992
- Texella reyesi Ubick & Briggs, 1992
- Texella shoshone Ubick & Briggs, 1992
- Texella spinoperca Ubick & Briggs, 1992
- Texella welbourni Ubick & Briggs, 1992
