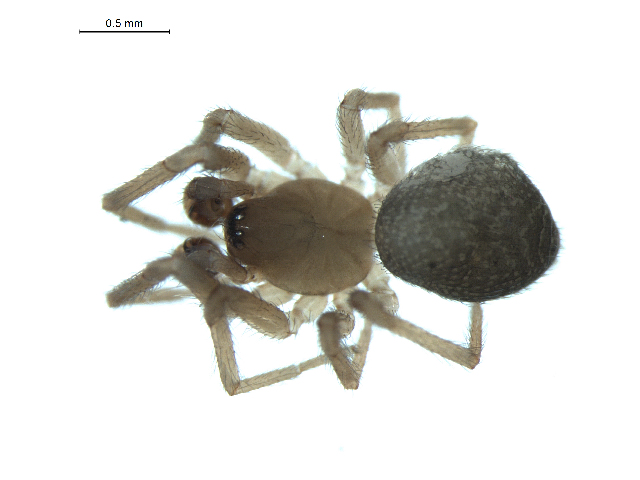
- male B. monticola
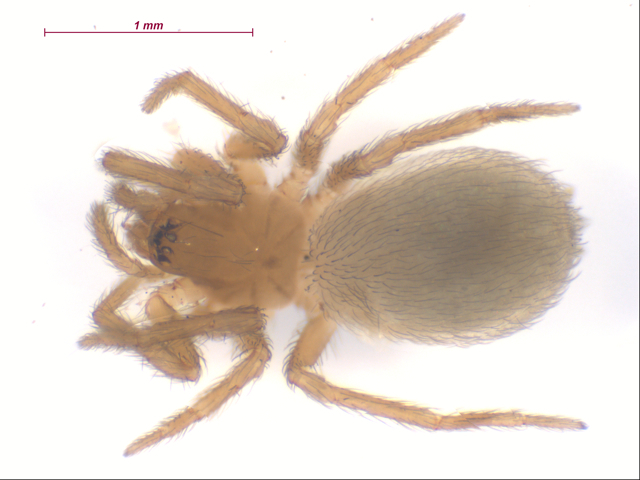
- female B. monticola

Scientific classification
- Kingdom: Animalia
- Phylum: Arthropoda
- Subphylum: Chelicerata
- Class: Arachnida
- Order: Araneae
- Infraorder: Araneomorphae
- Family: Cicurinidae
- Genus: Brommella; Tullgren, 1948

Type species
- B. falcigera (Balogh, 1935)

Species
- 22, see text

Synonyms
- Lathargenna Braun, 1963; Pagomys Chamberlin, 1948

= Brommella =

Genus of spiders

Brommella is a genus of cribellate araneomorph spiders in the family Cicurinidae, and was first described by Albert Tullgren in 1948.

== Species ==
As of October 2025, this genus includes 22 species:

- Brommella baiseensis Li, 2017 – China
- Brommella bishopi (Chamberlin & Gertsch, 1958) – United States
- Brommella casseabri Li, 2017 – China
- Brommella chongzuoensis Li, 2017 – China
- Brommella digitata Lu, Chen & Zhang, 2015 – China
- Brommella dolabrata Li, 2017 – China
- Brommella falcigera (Balogh, 1935) – Europe, Turkey, Iran? (type species)
- Brommella funaria Li, 2017 – China
- Brommella hellenensis Wunderlich, 1995 – Greece
- Brommella josephkohi Li, 2017 – China
- Brommella lactea (Chamberlin & Gertsch, 1958) – United States
- Brommella linyuchengi Li, 2017 – China
- Brommella monticola (Gertsch & Mulaik, 1936) – Canada, United States
- Brommella punctosparsa (Oi, 1957) – China, Korea, Japan
- Brommella renguodongi Li, 2017 – China
- Brommella resima Li, 2017 – China
- Brommella sejuncta Li, 2017 – China
- Brommella spirula Li, 2017 – China
- Brommella tongyanfengi Li, 2017 – China
- Brommella wangfengcheni Li, 2017 – China
- Brommella xinganensis Li, 2017 – China
- Brommella yizhouensis Li, 2017 – China
