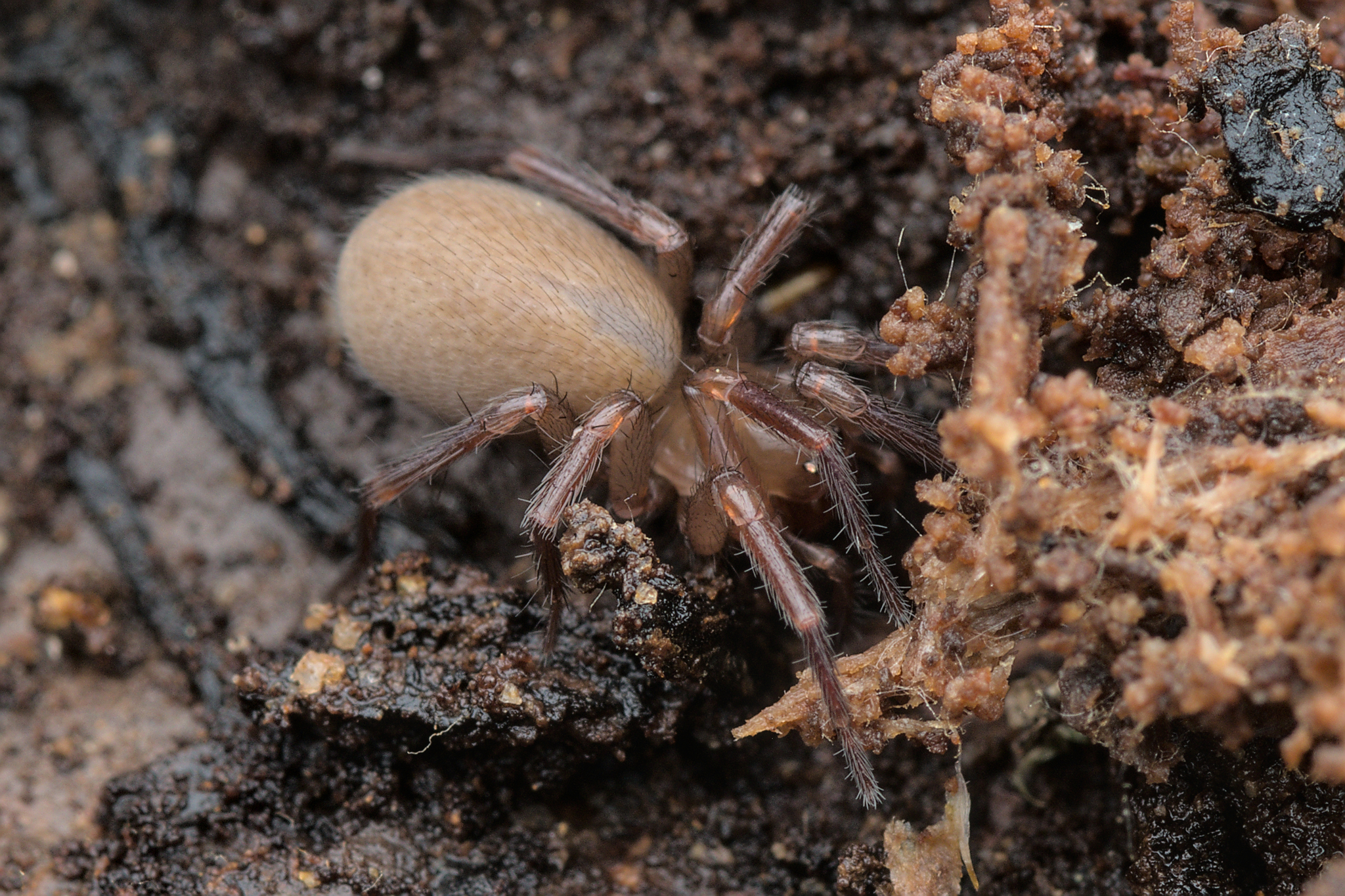
- Cicurina cicur in France
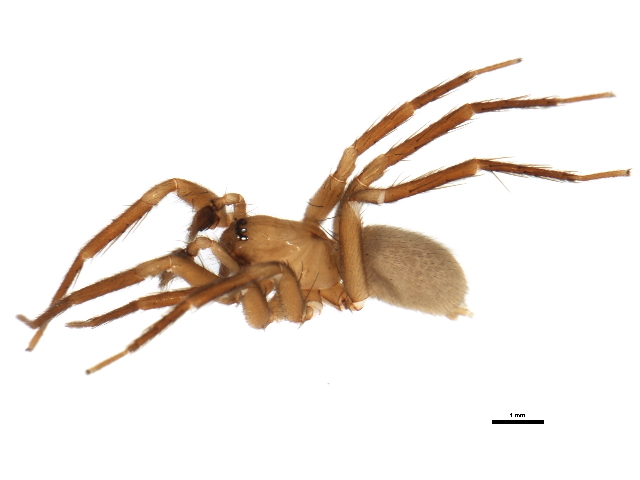
- Male Cicurina pallida

Scientific classification
- Kingdom: Animalia
- Phylum: Arthropoda
- Subphylum: Chelicerata
- Class: Arachnida
- Order: Araneae
- Infraorder: Araneomorphae
- Family: Cicurinidae; F. O. Pickard-Cambridge, 1893

Genera
- See text.
- blue: reported countries (WSC) green: observation hotspots (iNaturalist)

= Cicurinidae =

Family of spiders

Cicurinidae is a family of araneomorph spiders.

== Taxonomy ==
The taxon was first described by F. O. Pickard-Cambridge in 1893 as the subfamily Cicurinae. It was resurrected in 2023, with one genus (Brommella) transferred from Dictynidae and two (Chorizomma and Cicurina) from Hahniidae.

=== Phylogeny ===
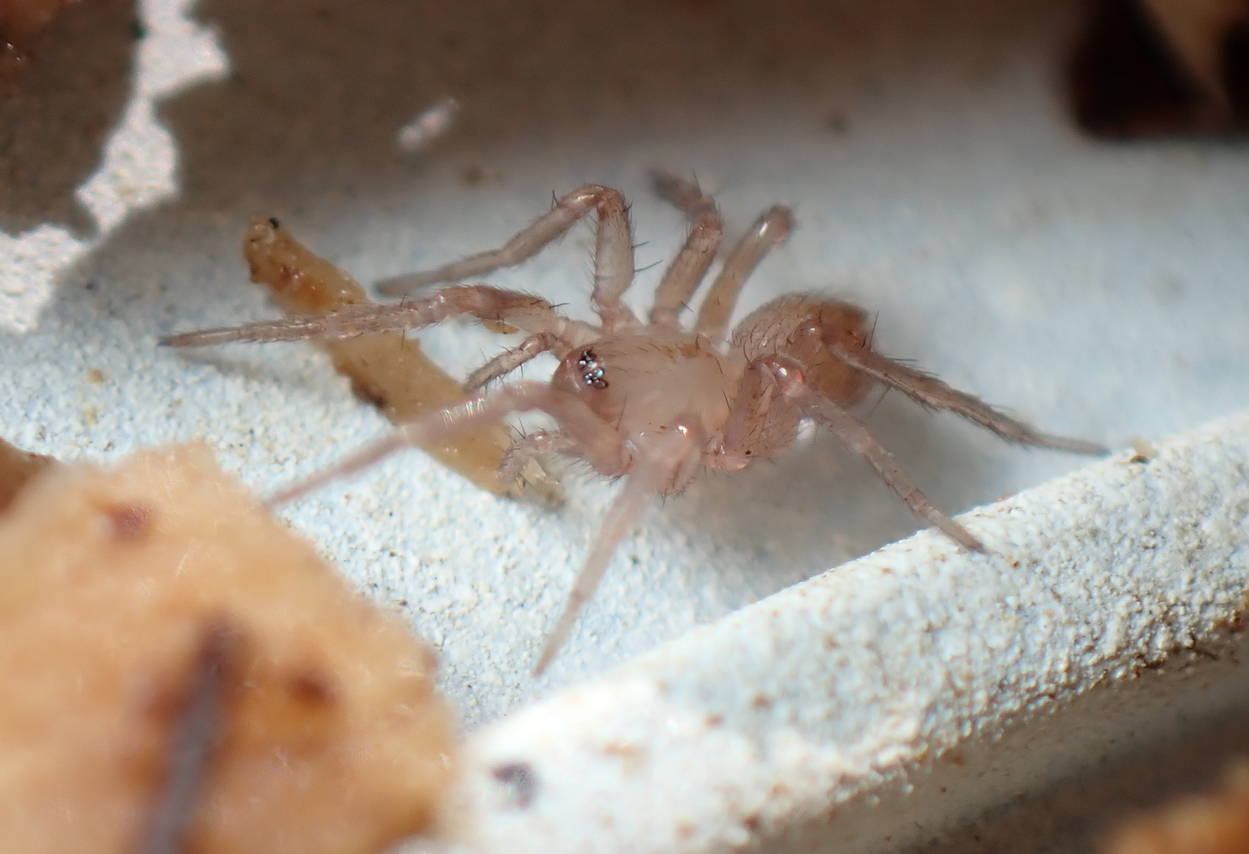
Chorizomma subterraneum

A 2023 molecular phylogenetic study of the 'marronoid' group of initially nine spider families led to a changed circumscription of some of the families, including two resurrected or new families, Cicurinidae and Macrobunidae. The relationships in the study's maximum likelihood summary tree are shown below. Two genera included in the study, Brommella and Cicurina, were found to form a monophyletic group, distinct from other families, and were placed in the Cicurinidae. (Chorizomma was later included on morphological grounds.)

- Marronoid clade
  - Amaurobiidae
  - - Agelenidae
    - - - Cycloctenidae
        - - Aorangia
          - - Stiphidiidae
            - Desidae
      - - Macrobunidae
        - - Hahniidae
          - - Cybaeidae
            - - Cicurinidae
              - - Toxopidae
                - Dictynidae

== Genera ==
As of January 2026, this family includes four genera and 183 species:

- Altimella Wang & Z. S. Zhang, 2024 – China
- Brommella Tullgren, 1948 – China, Japan, Korea, Iran?, Turkey, Czech Republic, Greece, North America
- Chorizomma Simon, 1872 – Spain, France
- Cicurina Menge, 1871 – China, Japan, Korea, Vietnam, North America, Europe to Central Asia

== Diagnosis ==
Members of the family Cicurinidae can be distinguished from Dictynidae and Hahniidae, as well as other marronoids, by their lack of a cribellum which is replaced by a small colulus with several bristles (setae). Their legs have three tarsal claws without claw tufts. Mature male palps have an enlarged retrolateral tibial apophysis.
